= Ambin group =

Sub-range of the Cottian Alps on the French-Italian border

- Gruppo d'Ambin / Groupe d'Ambin
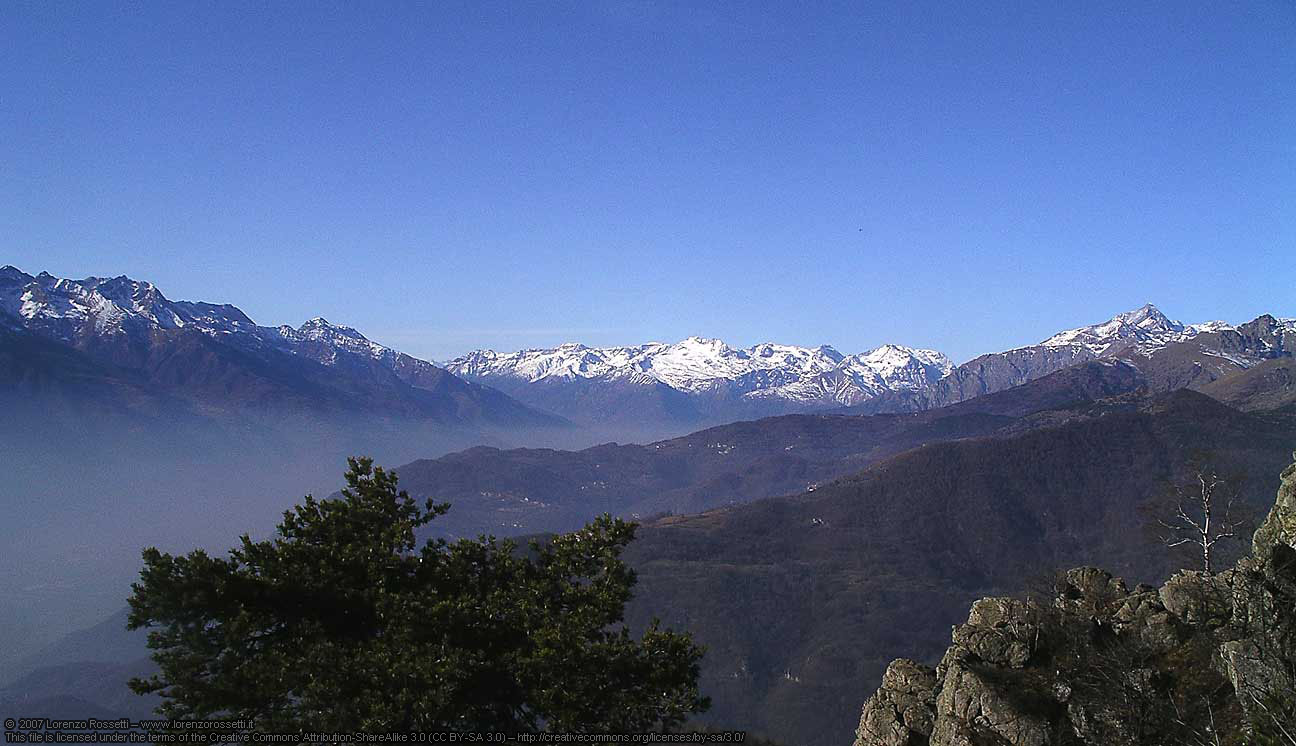
- Ambin group seen from Roccasella

Highest point
- Peak: Rognosa d'Etiache
- Elevation: 3,382 m (11,096 ft)
- Coordinates: 45°08′07″N 6°50′06″E

Geography
- Countries: Italy and France
- Regione, Région: Piedmont and Rhône-Alpes
- Provincia, Département: Turin and Savoie
- Parent range: Cottian Alps

The Ambin group (Groupe d'Ambin in French, Gruppo d'Ambin in Italian) is a sub-range of the Cottian Alps located on the French-Italian border.

== Geography ==
Administratively the range is divided between the Italian provincia di Torino (southern slopes) and the French département de la Savoie (northern slopes).

=== Borders ===
The borders of Ambin group are (clockwise):

- Etiache pass (west, it connects Ambin group with Pierre Menue group);
- ruisseau d'Etache, ruisseau d'Ambin, Arc and ruisseau de la Fémaz (north);
- Mont Cenis pass (east, it connects Ambin group with the Graian Alps);
- torrente Rochemolles, Dora Riparia and Cenischia (south).

== Notable summits ==
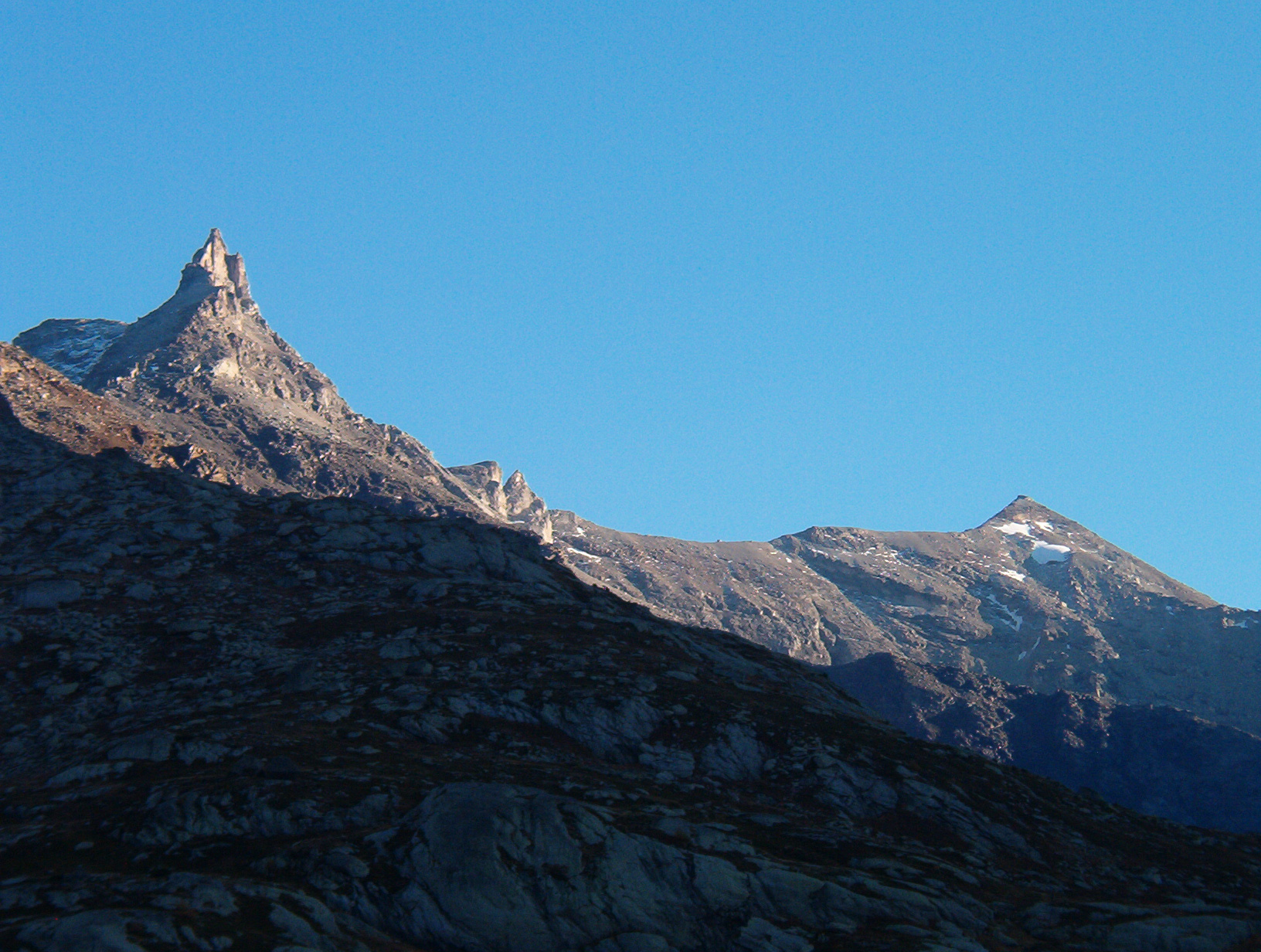
Mont d'Ambin (right) and Denti d'Ambin (left)

Name	metres	Name	metres
Punta Sommeiller	3,333	Rognosa d'Etiache	3,382
Mont d'Ambin	3,378	Dents d'Ambin	3,372
Monte Niblè	3,365	Punta Ferrand	3,348
Mont Giusalet	3,313	Cima del Vallonetto	3,217
Signal du Petit Mont Cenis	3,162	Punta Galambra	3,122
Gros Peyron	3,047	Monte Seguret	2,962
Mont Malamot	2,917	Monte Jafferau	2,805
La Pointe du Notaire	3,269	Le Petit Vallon	3,236
Pointe de Bellecombe	2,755	Mont Froid	2,822

== Mountain huts ==
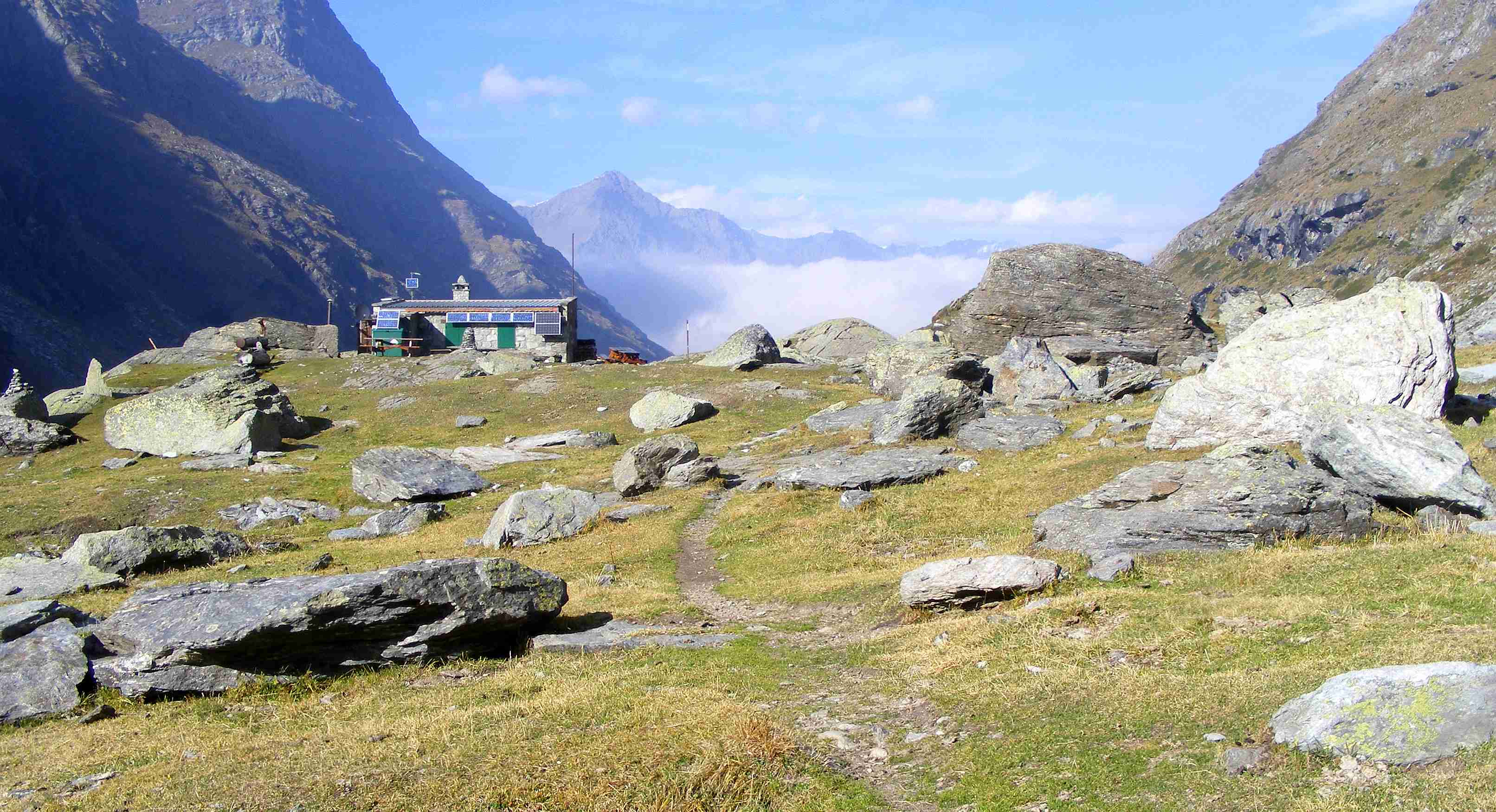
Refuge d'Ambin

- Rifugio Levi Molinari (1,850 m - Exilles)
- Refuge de Bramanette (2,080 m - Bramans)
- Refuge du Petit Mont-Cenis (2,110 m - Bramans)
- Rifugio Scarfiotti (2,165 m - Bardonecchia)
- Refuge d'Ambin (2,270 m - Bramans)
- Rifugio Avanzà (2,578 m - Venaus)
- Rifugio Piero Vacca (2,670 m - Venaus)
- Rifugio Luigi Vaccarone (2,747 m - Giaglione)
- Bivacco Sigot (2,921 m - Exilles)
- Bivacco Walter Blais (2,925 m - Exilles)

== Bibliography ==
- Aruga, Roberto; Pietro Losana; Alberto Re (1985). Alpi Cozie settentrionali. Guida ai monti d'Italia (in Italian). Club Alpino Italiano.

== Maps ==
- Italian official cartography (Istituto Geografico Militare - IGM); on-line version: www.pcn.minambiente.it
- French official cartography (Institut Géographique National - IGN); on-line version: www.geoportail.fr
- I.G.C. (Istituto Geografico Centrale) - Carta dei sentieri e dei rifugi scala 1:50.000 n. 1 Valli di Susa Chisone e Germanasca e 1:25.000 n. 104 Bardonecchia Monte Thabor Sauze d'Oulx
