= Punta Sommeiller =

Mountain in Italy

- Pointe Sommeiller
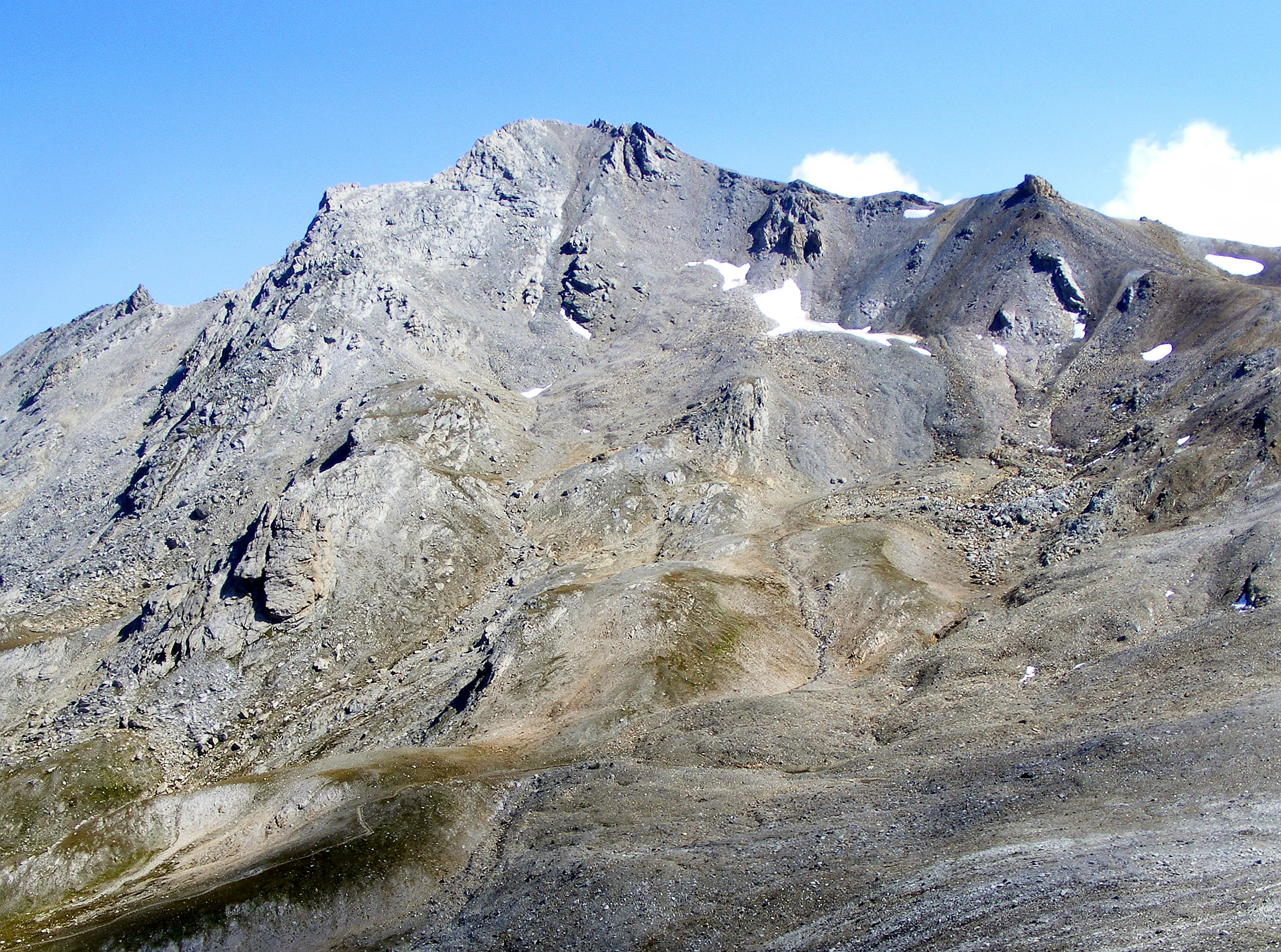
- The mountain seen from Valfredda western pass

Highest point
- Elevation: 3,333 m (10,935 ft)
- Prominence: 339 m (1,112 ft)
- Parent peak: Rognosa d'Etiache
- Isolation: 1.58 km (0.98 mi)
- Listing: Alpine mountains above 3000 m
- Coordinates: 45°07′42″N 06°51′09″E

Geography
- Location within Alps
- Location: Rhône-Alpes, France; Piedmont, Italy
- Parent range: Cottian Alps

Climbing
- First ascent: Martino Baretti
- Easiest route: for the southern ridge

Punta Sommeiller (in Italian) or Pointe Sommeiller (in French) is a mountain of the Province of Turin, Italy and of Savoie, France. It lies in the Cottian Alps range. It has an elevation of 3,333 metres (10,935 ft) above sea level.

== Etymology ==
The old name of the mountain was Rognosa di Galambra, which derived from the secondary valley of Galambra (a tributary of Dora Riparia). It was then renamed by the geologist Martino Baretti, author of the first documented ascent to the summit, in order to avoid confusions with two neighboring "Rognosa"s, Rognosa d'Etiache and Rognosa del Sestriere. The new name was chosen to honour Germain Sommeiller, the civil engineer which directed the construction of the Fréjus Rail Tunnel between Savoy and Piedmont.

== Geography ==
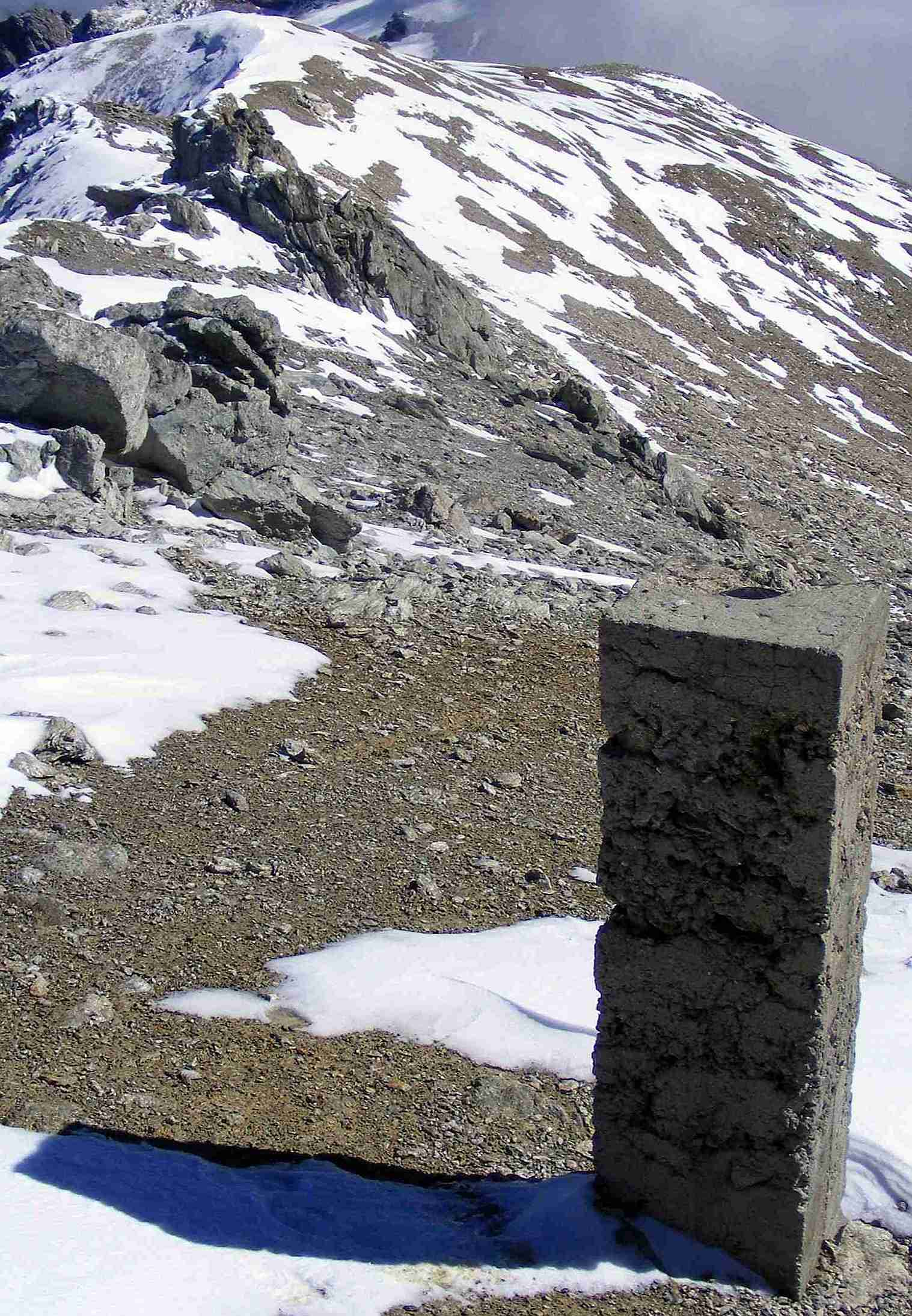
IGM geodetic pillar on the summit

In the French subdivision of western Alps it belongs to the Massif du Mont-Cenis while in the SOIUSA (International Standardized Mountain Subdivision of the Alps) it is part of the mountain group called "gruppo d'Ambin" (Italian) or "groupe d'Ambin" (French).

Administratively the mountain is divided between the Italian comunes of Bardonecchia (SW face) and Exilles (SE face) and the French commune of Bramans (N face).

A geodetic point of the Italian Military Geographic Institute is defined on the top of the mountain.

== Access to the summit ==
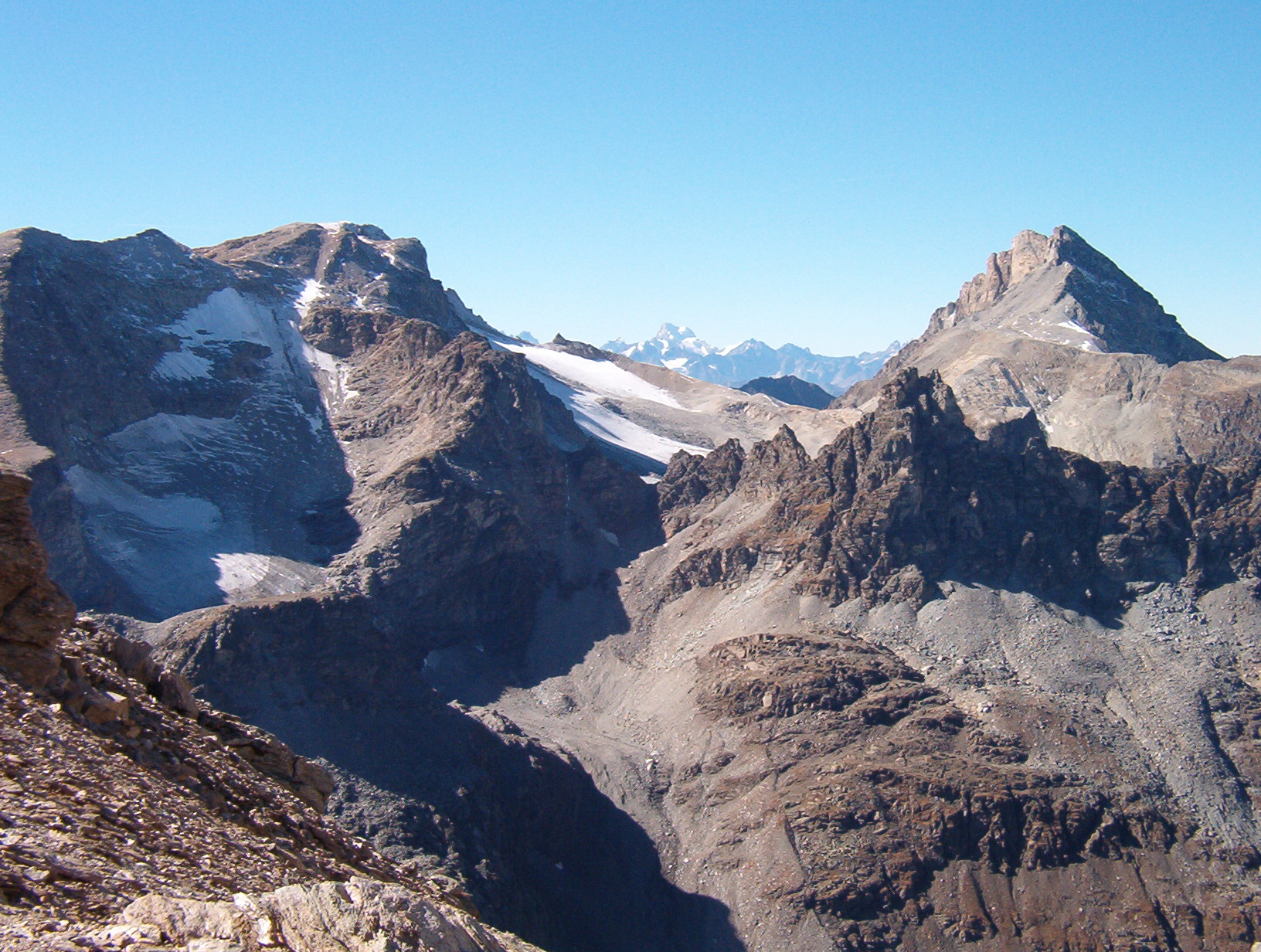
The mountain (left) with Sommeiller's pass (2993 m) and Rognosa d'Etiache

The easiest route for the summit starts from passo Settentrionale dei Fourneaux (3,159 m, which connects Exilles and Bardonecchia), then follows the south ridge of the mountain.

== Mountain huts ==
- Rifugio Scarfiotti (2,165 m - Bardonecchia)
- Rifugio Levi Molinari (1,850 m - Exilles)
- Bivacco Sigot (2,910 m - Exilles)
- Refuge d'Ambin (2,270 m - Bramans)

== Maps ==
- Italian official cartography (Istituto Geografico Militare - IGM); on-line version: www.pcn.minambiente.it
- French official cartography (Institut géographique national - IGN); on-line version: www.geoportail.fr
- I.G.C. (Istituto Geografico Centrale) - Carta dei sentieri e dei rifugi scala 1:50.000 n. 1 Valli di Susa Chisone e Germanasca e 1:25.000 n. 104 Bardonecchia Monte Thabor Sauze d'Oulx
