= Rognosa d'Etiache =

Mountain in Italy

- French: Rognosa d'Étache
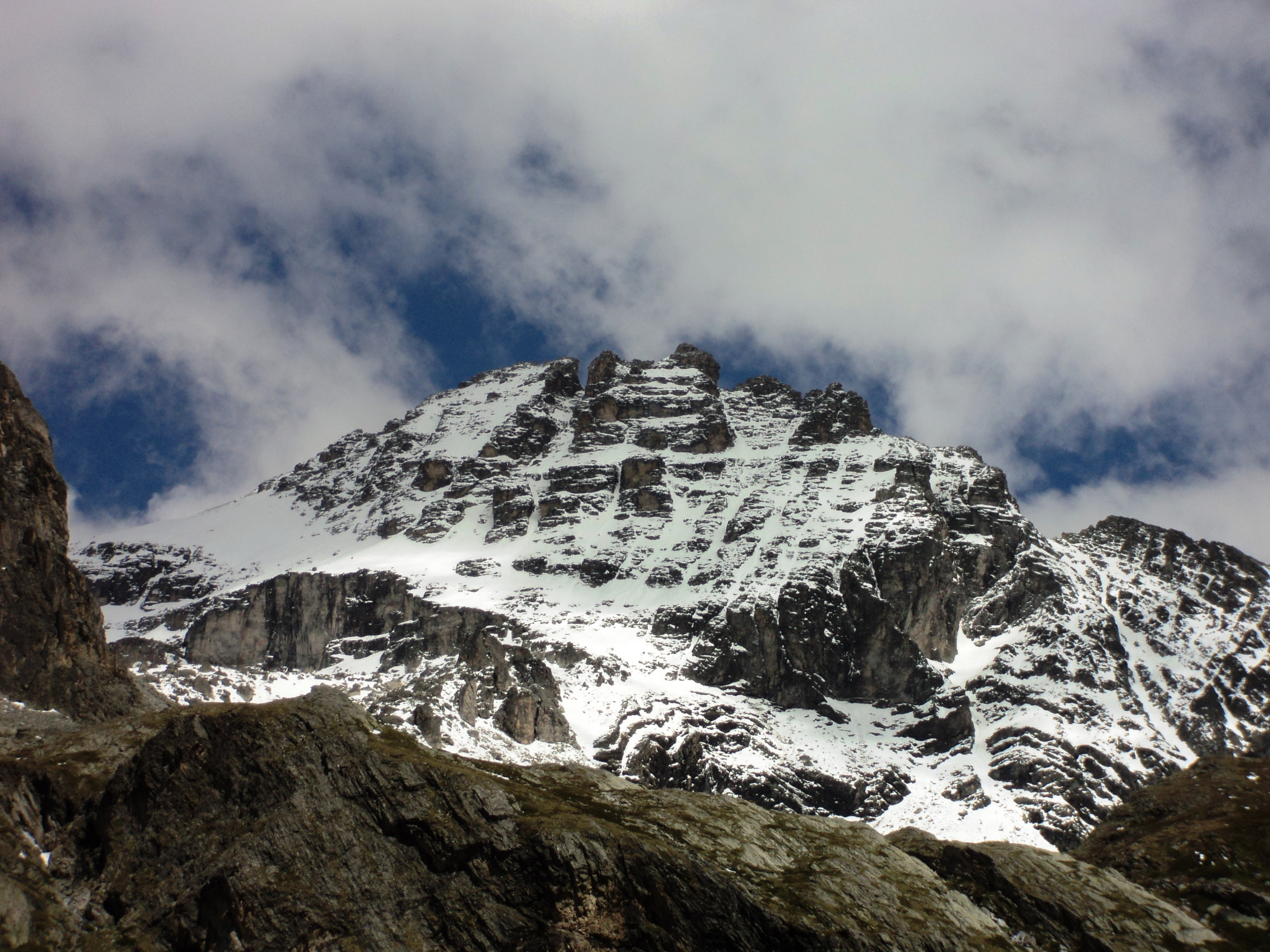
- View from Rifugio Scarfiotti

Highest point
- Elevation: 3,382 m (11,096 ft)
- Prominence: 583
- Parent peak: Aiguille de Scolette
- Isolation: 5.86 km (3.64 mi)
- Listing: Alpine mountains above 3000 m
- Coordinates: 45°08′07″N 06°50′06″E

Geography
- Location within Alps
- Location: Rhône-Alpes, France; Piedmont, Italy
- Parent range: Ambin group (Cottian Alps)

Climbing
- First ascent: 1875 by Augusto Sibille (SE summit)
- Easiest route: from Rifugio Scarfiotti

Rognosa d'Etiache (in Italian) or Rognosa d'Étache (in French) is a mountain in the Cottian Alps on the border of Turin, Italy, and Savoie, France. It has an elevation of 3,382 metres above sea level.

== Geography ==
The mountain is located at the head of the Susa valley in Italy and the Maurienne valley in France and is on the border of the Italian comune of Bardonecchia to the south and the French commune of Bramans to the north.

With an elevation of 3,382 m, it is the second highest peak of the Northern Cottian Alps after the Aiguille de Scolette (3,506 m), edging out Mont d'Ambin to its east by four metres.

The SOIUSA partition of the Alps places Rognosa in the Ambin group of the northern Cottian Alps, in the Etiache ridge with code I/B-9.IV-A.2.a. According to the French partition of the Western Alps, the mountain is part of the Ambin group of the fr:Massif du Mont-Cenis.

== Access to the summit ==
The mountain has a long summit ridge running NE to SW with three peaks, the Pt. NE (3,376 m) on the French border, and the Pt. SO (southwest; 3,382 m) and Torre Maria Celeste (3,342 m) on the Italian side. The SE face of the ridge is 300 m high and is pretty much vertical. It was first scaled in 1929 and offers multiple hard climbing routes. The easiest route to the summit starts from Rifugio Scarfiotti (a CAI mountain hut) and follows the WNW face. It requires some climbing skills.

== Mountain huts ==
- Rifugio Scarfiotti (2,165 m).
- Refuge d'Ambin (2,270 m).

== Maps ==
- Italian official cartography (Istituto Geografico Militare - IGM); on-line version: www.pcn.minambiente.it
- French official cartography (Institut Géographique National - IGN); on-line version: www.geoportail.fr
- I.G.C. (Istituto Geografico Centrale), Carta dei sentieri e dei rifugi 1:50.000 scale n. 1 Valli di Susa Chisone e Germanasca and 1:25.000 scale n. 104 Bardonecchia Monte Thabor Sauze d'Oulx
