= Col d'Étache =

- Italian: Colle d'Etiache
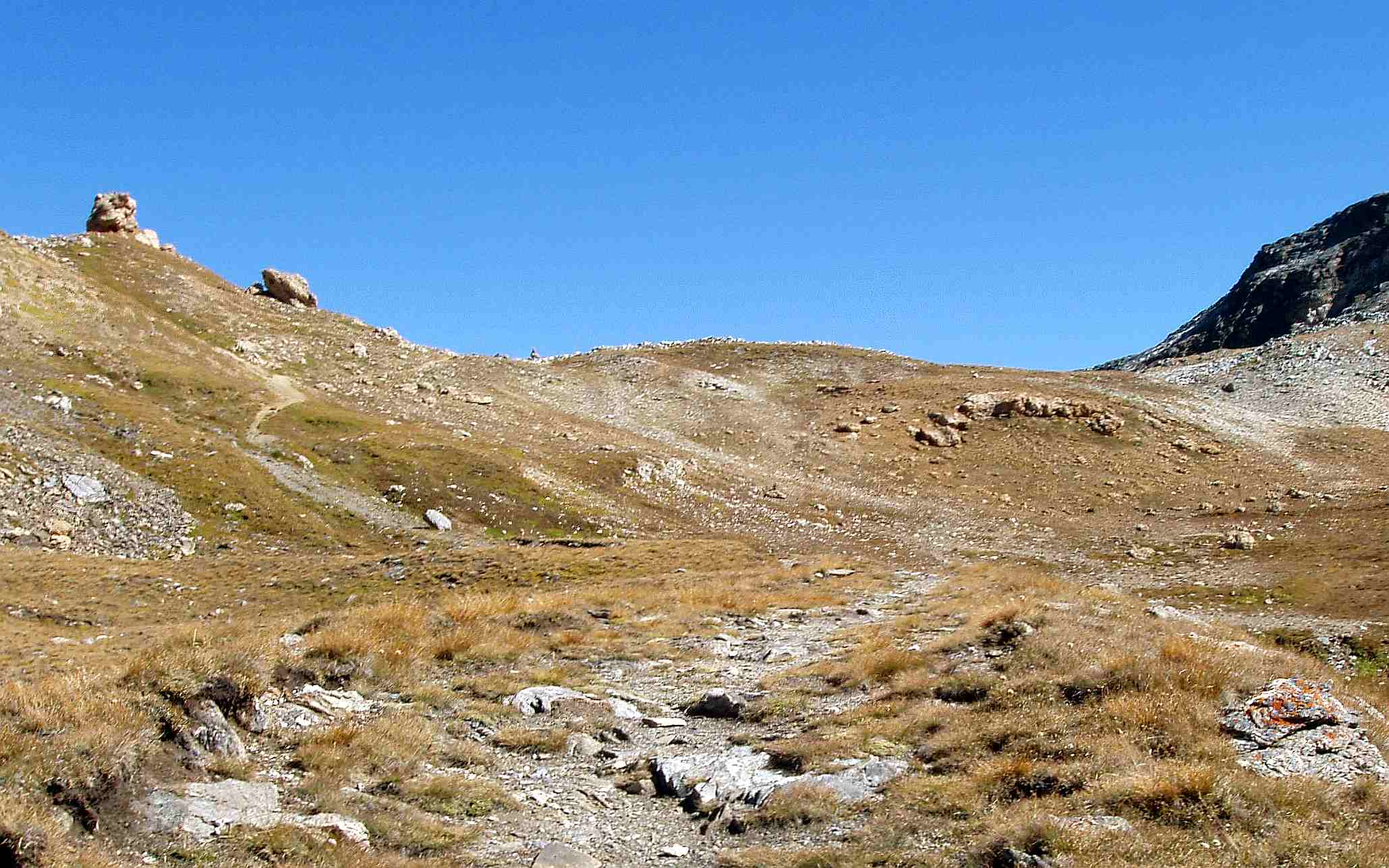
- Southern view of the pass

- Location within Alps
- Elevation: 2,799 metres (9,183 ft)
- Traversed by: footpath

Third Approach
- Location: Piedmont, Italy; Rhône-Alpes, France
- Range: Cottian Alps
- Coordinates: 45°08′53″N 06°48′47″E

Col d'Étache in French, (in Italian Colle d'Etiache), is a pedestrian pass (el. 2,799 m) across the Cottian Alps. It connects Susa Valley (Province of Turin, Italy) and Maurienne (Savoie, France).

== Geography ==
The pass is located between mount Gros Peyron (3,047 m, SE) and Cresta San Michele (or Pierre Minieu, 3,252 m, NW). It belongs to the water divide between the drainage basins of Arc and Dora Riparia (thus between Rhone and Po basins).

== Hiking ==
The pass can be accessed from the south by a wide footpath starting from Rifugio Scarfiotti, a CAI mountain hut located in the comune of Bardonecchia at 2,165 m. On the French side the footpath continues until Le Planey, a village of Bramans.

== Maps ==
- Italian official cartography (Istituto Geografico Militare - IGM); on-line version: www.pcn.minambiente.it
- French official cartography (Institut Géographique National - IGN); on-line version: www.geoportail.fr
- I.G.C. (Istituto Geografico Centrale), Carta dei sentieri e dei rifugi 1:50.000 scale n. 1 Valli di Susa Chisone e Germanasca and 1:25.000 scale n. 104 Bardonecchia Monte Thabor Sauze d'Oulx
