= Cenischia =

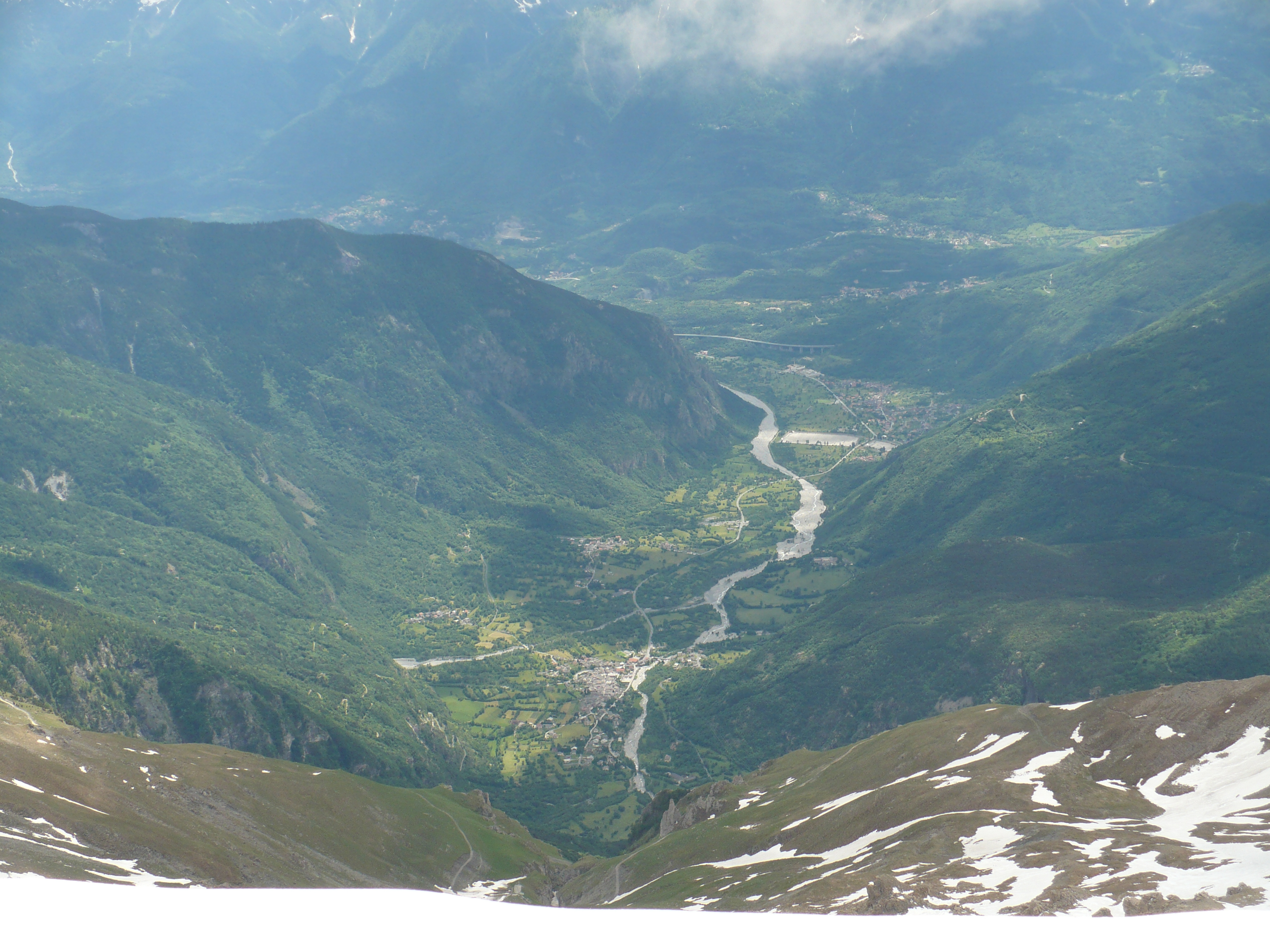
- The Cenischia from Punta Lamet

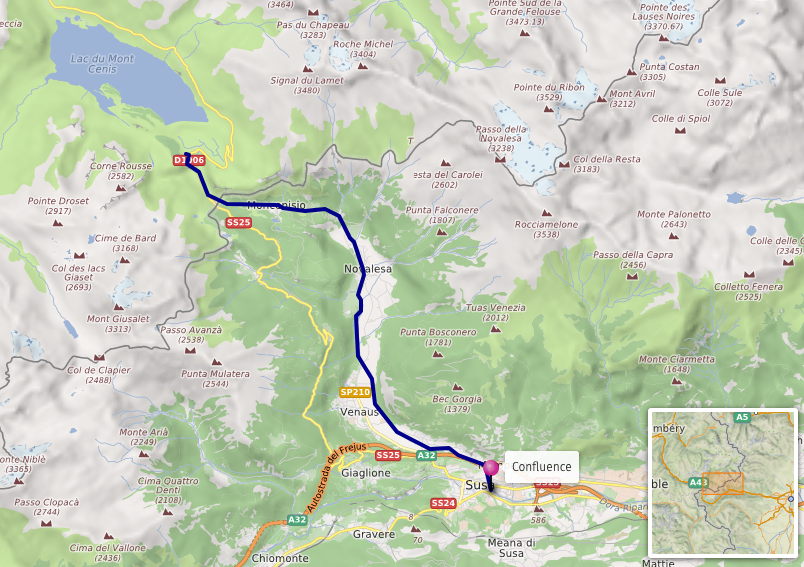
- Cenischia location

Location
- Country: France: department of Savoie; Italy: Metropolitan City of Turin

Physical characteristics
- Source
  - location: Col du Mont Cenis
  - elevation: c. 3,171 m (10,404 ft)
- Mouth
  - location: Dora Riparia, near Susa
  - coordinates: 45°8′10″N 7°3′29″E
- Length: 24.8 km (15.4 mi)
- Basin size: 147.4 km^{2} (56.9 sq mi)
- Discharge
  - average: 3.02 m^{3}/s (107 cu ft/s)

Basin features
- Progression: Dora Riparia

The Cenischia (Italian pronunciation: [tʃeˈniskja]; French: Cenise, pronounced [səniz]) is a mountain torrent which straddles the south-west French department of Savoie and the north-west Italian Metropolitan City of Turin, in Piedmont. Part of the Po basin, it is a left tributary of the Dora Riparia and forms the valley called the Val Cenischia which marks the boundary between the Graian Alps to the north and the Cottian Alps to the south.

The sources are in France near the Col du Mont Cenis (Italian: Colle del Moncenisio). Before crossing into Italy, the river is dammed to form the Lac du Montcenis which receives the water of a number of other torrents and is employed as a source of hydropower.

The Cenischia flows out of the reservoir near La Grande Croix and, having crossed into Italy, passes through the settlements of Moncenisio, Novalesa and Venaus before meeting the Dora Riparia at Susa.
