= Mont d'Ambin =

Mountain in the Cottian Alps on the French-Italian border

- Italian: Rocca d'Ambin
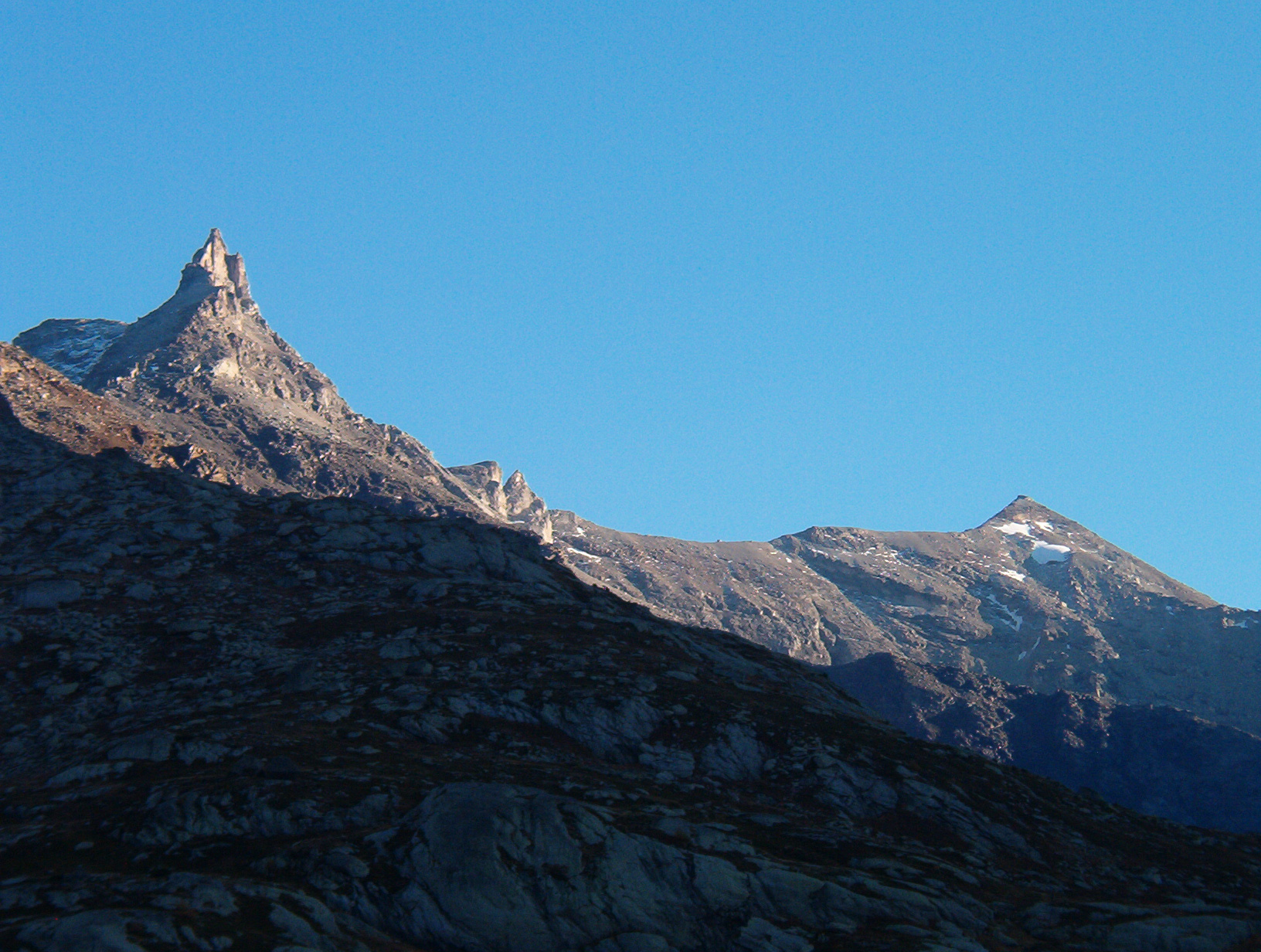
- Mont d'Ambin (right)

Highest point
- Elevation: 3,378 m (11,083 ft)
- Prominence: 506 m (1,660 ft)
- Parent peak: Rognosa d'Etiache
- Isolation: 4.55 km (2.83 mi)
- Listing: Alpine mountains above 3000 m
- Coordinates: 45°09′25″N 06°53′03″E

Geography
- Location within Alps
- Location: Savoie, France; Province of Turin, Italy
- Parent range: Cottian Alps

Mont d'Ambin (in French) or Rocca d'Ambin (in Italian) is a mountain on the border of Savoie, France and of the Province of Turin, Italy. It lies in the Ambin group of the Cottian Alps. On the Italian side, it commands the view of the Val di Susa. It has an elevation of 3,378 metres (11,083 ft) above sea level. The Mont d'Ambin base tunnel of the Lyon–Turin rail link is being dug at its base.

== Maps ==
- Italian official cartography (Istituto Geografico Militare – IGM); on-line version: www.pcn.minambiente.it
- French official cartography (Institut Géographique National – IGN); on-line version: www.geoportail.fr
- Istituto Geografico Centrale – Carta dei sentieri e dei rifugi scala 1:50.000 n. 1 Valli di Susa Chisone e Germanasca e 1:25.000 n. 104 Bardonecchia Monte Thabor Sauze d'Oulx
