= Dora di Bardonecchia =

River in Piedmont, Italy

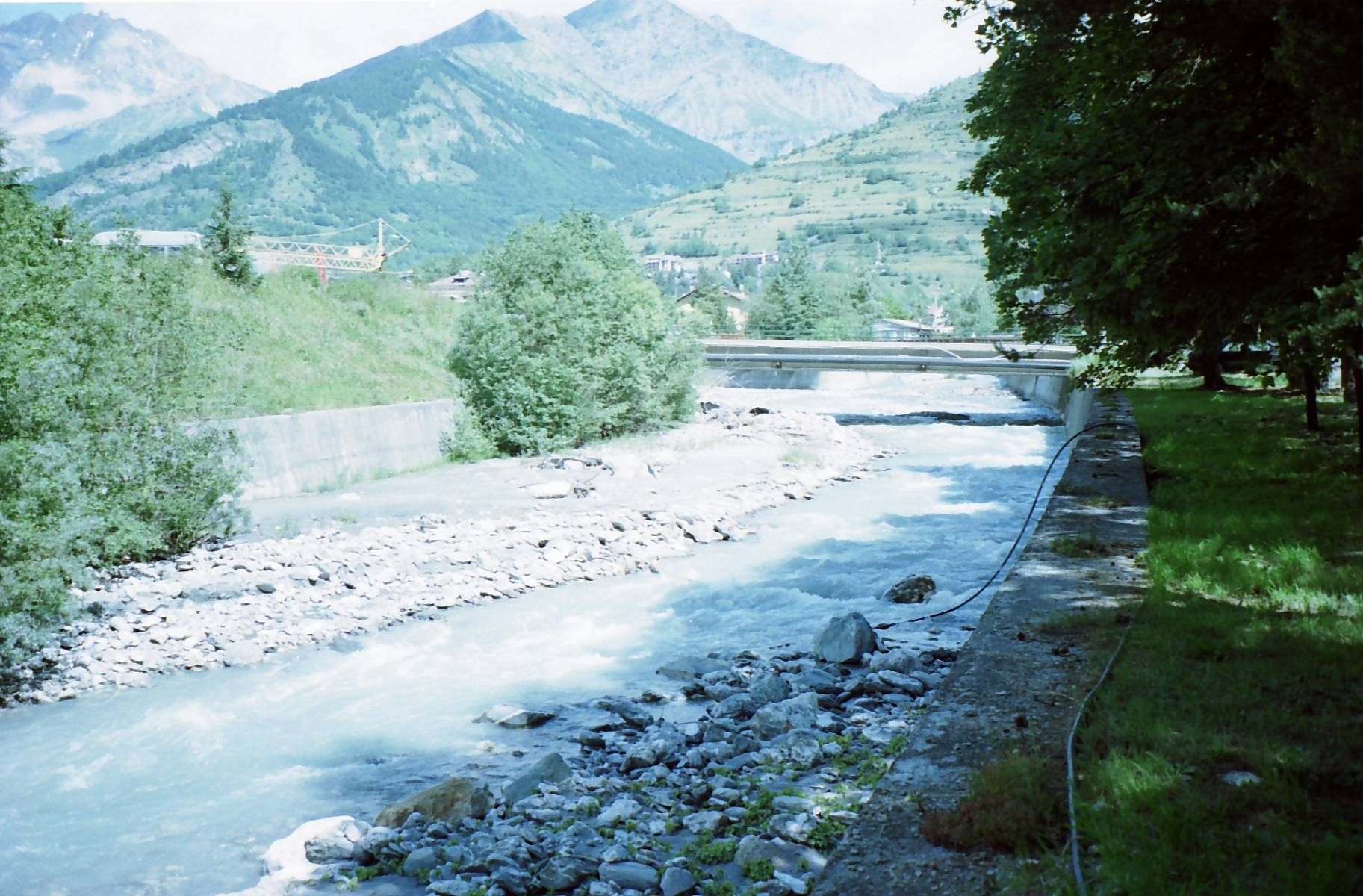
- The river a little below Bardonecchia

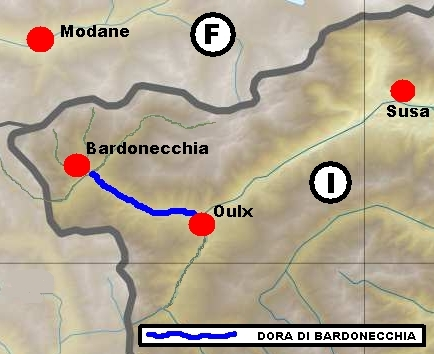
- Location within the upper Susa Valley (NW Italy)

Location
- Country: Italy

Physical characteristics
- Source
  - location: Confluence of various mountain torrents at Bardonecchia
  - elevation: 1,250 m (4,100 ft)
- Mouth: Dora Riparia
  - coordinates: 45°2′41″N 6°50′9″E
- Basin size: 240.5 km^{2} (92.9 mi^{2})
- Discharge
  - average: 4.3 m^{3}/s (150 cu ft/s)

Basin features
- Progression: Dora Riparia→ Po→ Adriatic Sea

The Dora di Bardonecchia is a short tributary of the Dora Riparia river, lying entirely within the upper Susa Valley in the Metropolitan City of Turin, Piedmont, Italy.

== Geography ==
It originates just outside Bardonecchia from the confluence of mountain streams from the valleys of Rochemolles, Fréjus, Rho, and Valle Stretta. It follows the valley for about 20 kilometres (12 mi) and joins the Dora Riparia northeast of Oulx.

Several major road and rail lines run parallel to the river: the A32 motorway from Turin to Bardonecchia; state highway SS535, Strada Statale di Bardonecchia; the international double-track Fréjus railway, the main line of the Rome–Turin–Paris run.

== Other projects ==
Media related to Dora di Bardonecchia at Wikimedia Commons
