= SOIUSA code =

SOIUSA code is the code used in the International Standardized Mountain Subdivision of the Alps (ISMSA or SOIUSA), a proposal by Italian Alpinist, Sergio Marazzi, to re-categorize the mountains and mountain ranges of the Alps. The proposal has been aired since 2005 but has yet to receive official recognition.

== SOIUSA groups' hierarchy ==
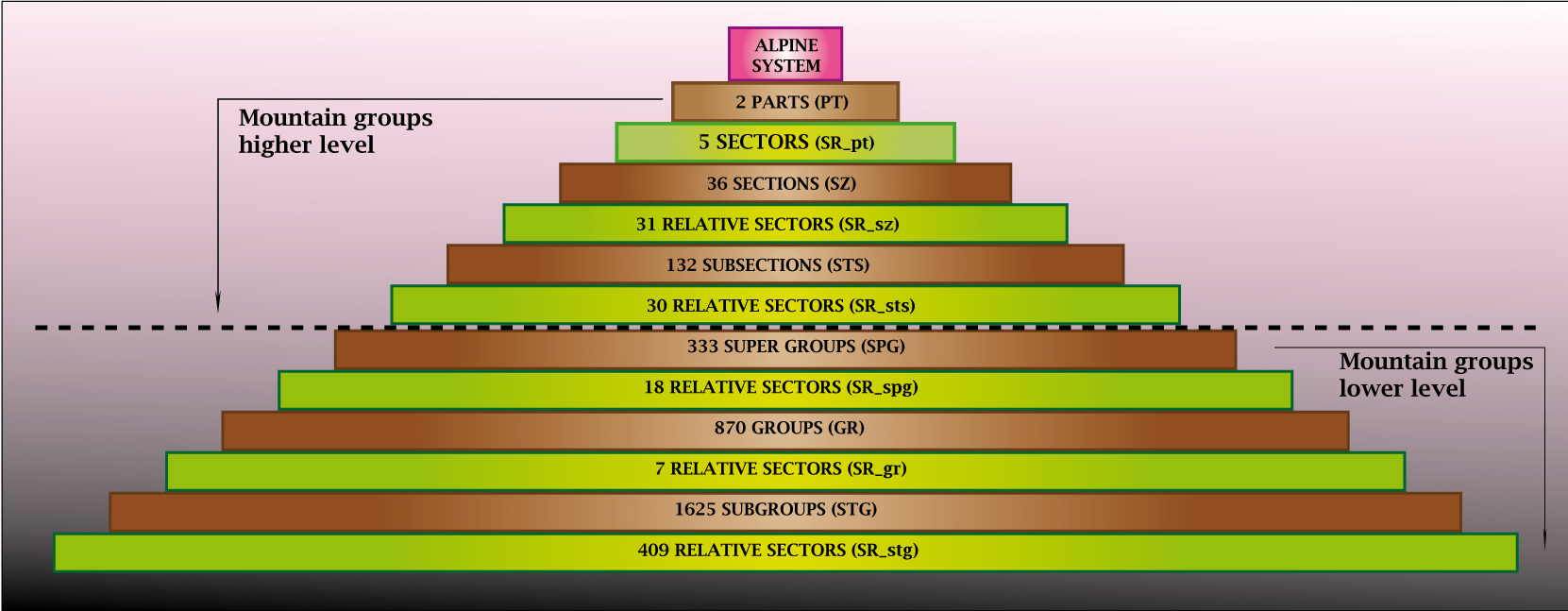
SOIUSA pyramid showing its groups' hierarchy.

SOIUSA divides the Alps in two main regions, the Western Alps and Eastern Alps. These two main regions are further divided in:

- 5 major sectors (SR);
- 36 sections (SZ);
- 132 subsections (STS);
- 333 supergroups (SPG);
- 870 groups (GR);
- 1625 subgroups (STG).

Using this system, any Alpine mountain can be given a code which shows which region, sector, section, subsection, supergroup, group and subgroup it belongs to.

== Encoding ==
SOIUSA code is built in the following way:

- 2 main parts:
  - Western Alps are identified by roman numeral I;
  - Eastern Alps are identified by roman numeral II;
- 5 major sectors:
  - in Western Alps:
    - South-western Alps are identified by upper-case letter A;
    - North-western Alps are identified by upper-case letter B;
  - in Eastern Alps:
    - Central Eastern Alps are identified by upper-case letter A;
    - Northern Limestone Alps are identified by upper-case letter B;
    - Southern Limestone Alps are identified by lower-case letter C;
- 36 sections: identified by numbers from 1 to 36 starting from Ligurian Alps and ending with Slovenian prealps;
- 132 subsections: identified in their own section by the roman numerals needed to count every subsection;
- 333 supergroups: identified in their own subsection by all the upper-case letters needed to count every supergroup;
- 870 groups: identified in their own supergroup by all the numbers needed to count every group;
- 1625 subgroups: identified in their own group by all the lower-case letters needed to count every subgroup.

Following these rules and using the punctuation marks (/; -; .; -; . and .) a summit will be encoded in the following way:

roman numeral (I or II) / upper-case letter (A, B or C) - number from 1 to 36 . roman numeral - upper-case letter . number . lower-case letter

In some case the final lower-case letter can be missing because some group is not divided into subgroups.
It can seldom happen (i.e.:Monte Tagliaferro) that a subgroup too is further divided in sectors; in that case the last lower-case letter is followed by a slash (/) and a second lower-case letter.

== Encoding example ==
SOIUSA parameters of
pointe Sommeiller (Fr) /
punta Sommeiller (It)

- main part = Western Alps
- major sector = South Western Alps
- section = Cottian Alps
- subsection = Northern Cottian Alps
- supergroup = chaîne Bernaude-Pierre Menue-Ambin (Fr) /
  catena Bernauda-Pierre Menue-Ambin (It)
- group = groupe d'Ambin (Fr) /
  gruppo d'Ambin (It)
- subgroup = crête Sommeiller-Vallonetto (Fr) / sottogruppo Sommeiller-Vallonetto (It)
- code = I/A-4.III-B.6.b

Pointe Sommeiller (Fr) / Punta Sommeiller (It) code is:

I/A-4.III-B.6.b

It can be decoded in the following way:

- I: the mountain belongs to Western Alps,
- A: the mountain belongs to South Western Alps,
- 4: the mountain belongs to Cottian Alps,
- III: the mountain belongs to Northern Cottian Alps (which are the third out of three subsections belonging to Cottian Alps),
- B: the mountain belongs to chaîne Bernaude-Pierre Menue-Ambin (Fr) / catena Bernauda-Pierre Menue-Ambin (It) (which is the second out of two supergroups belonging to Northern Cottian Alps),
- 6: the mountain belongs to groupe d'Ambin (Fr) / gruppo d'Ambin (It) (which is the sixth out of six groups belonging to Bernaude-Pierre Menue-Ambin supergroup),
- b: the mountain belongs to a subgroup called crête Sommeiller-Vallonetto (Fr) / sottogruppo Sommeiller-Vallonetto (It) (which is the second out of three subgroups belonging to Ambin group).
