= Ponte Mosca =

Coordinates: 45.08127°N 7.68654°E

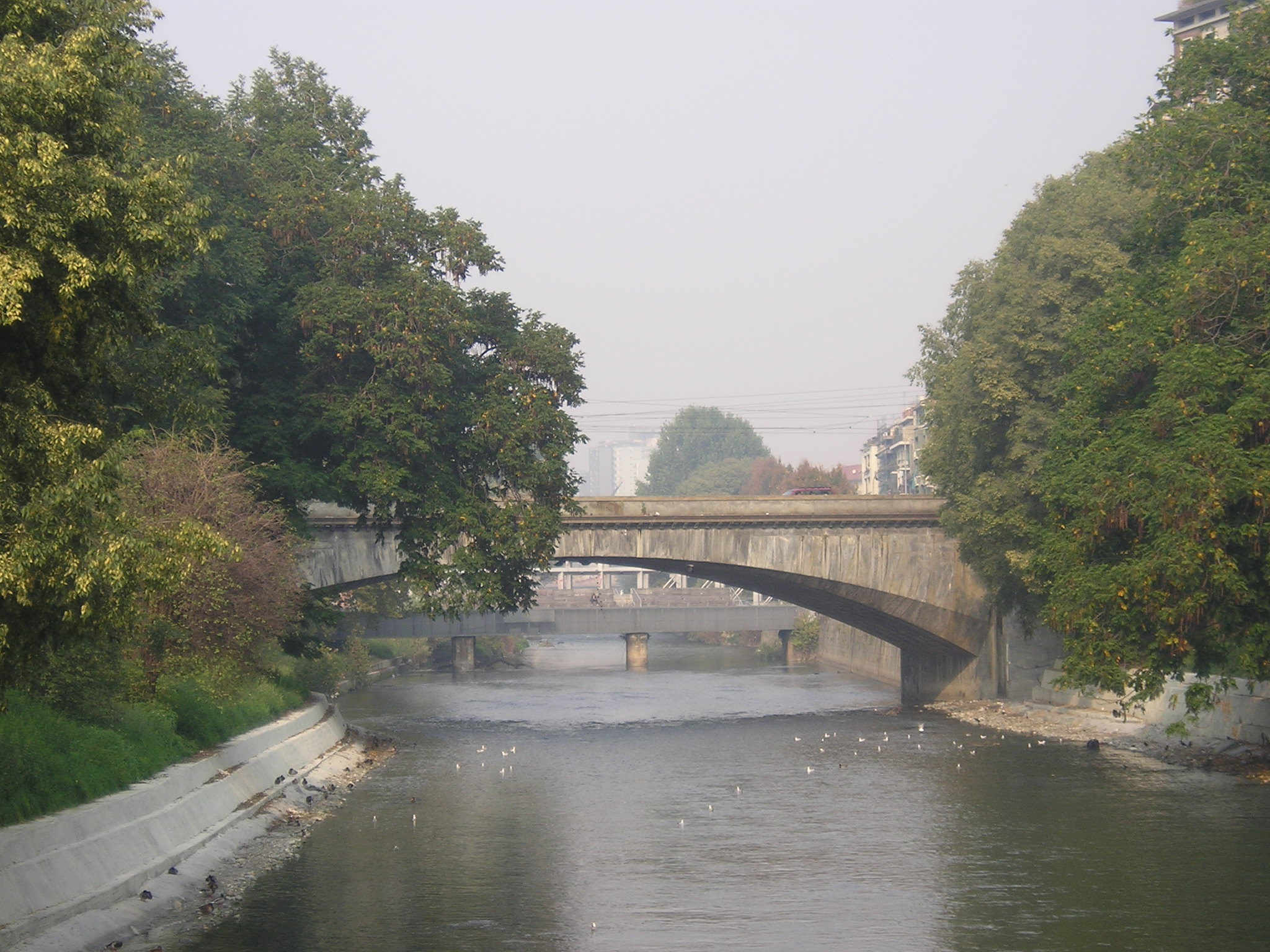
Ponte Mosca, Turin

The Ponte Mosca is a historic bridge in Turin, region of Piedmont, Italy. It was the first stone bridge built in the city by the Sabauda dynasty. The bridge was erected over the Dora Riparia; the corso Giulio Cesare enters the Aurora quarter, near Porta Palazzo, over this bridge.

The plan for a bridge over the Dora first was requested by Napoleon in 1807. But it became a reality in 1818, when an urban renewal plan was put forward that also demolished the walls and bastions of the city. The architect Carlo Bernardo Mosca was commissioned a stone bridge to replace the earlier wood structure. Construction proceeded from 1823 to 1830. At inauguration, the 45-meter-long (148 ft) bridge was considered technologically advanced. It was renamed Mosca in 1868, a year after the architect's death.
