= Usseaux =

- Comune
- Comune di Usseaux
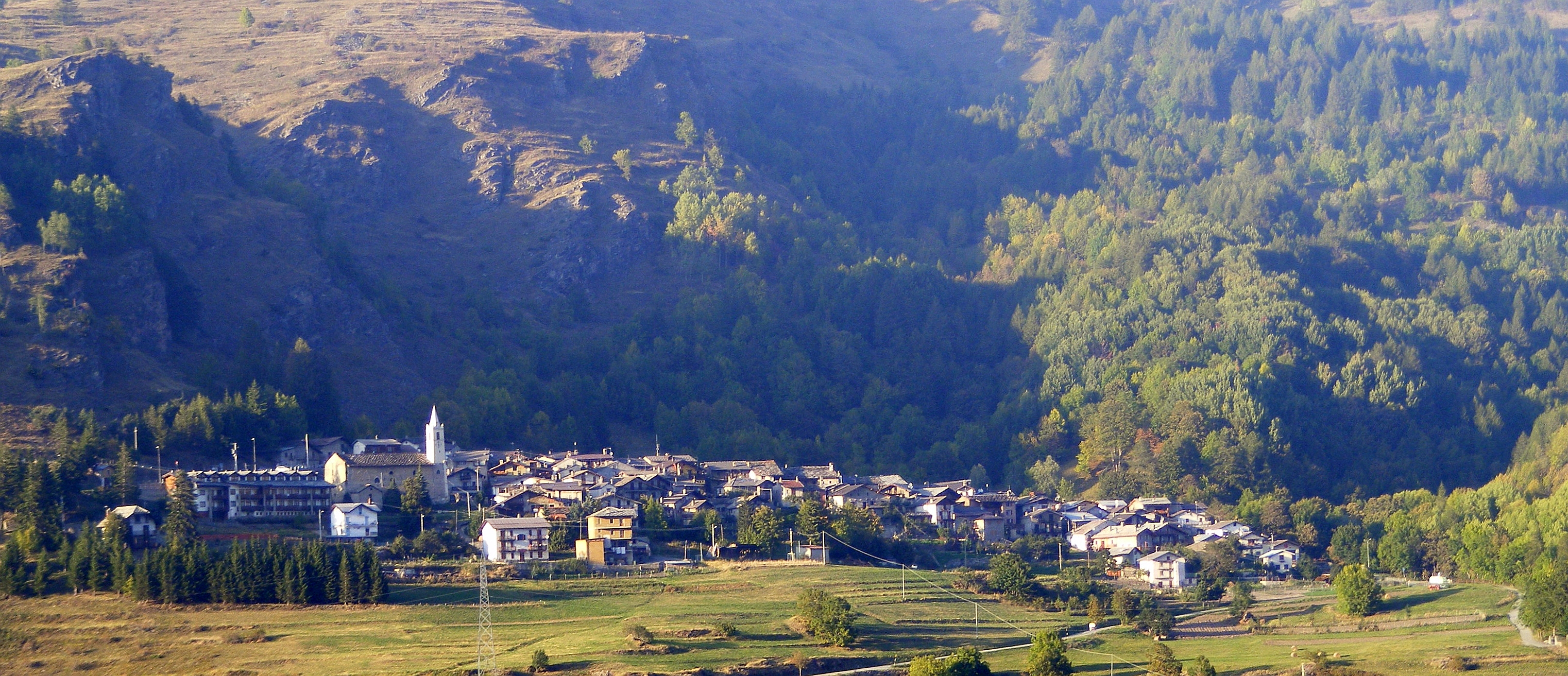

- Location within Italy Location within Piedmont
- Coordinates: 45°2′56″N 7°1′46″E
- Country: Italy
- Region: Piedmont
- Metropolitan city: Turin (TO)
- Frazioni: Balboutet, Fraisse, Laux, Pourrieres

Government
  - Mayor: Andrea Ferretti

Area
  - Total: 37.97 km^{2} (14.66 sq mi)
- Elevation: 1,416 m (4,646 ft)

Population (1-1-2017)
  - Total: 182
  - Density: 4.79/km^{2} (12.4/sq mi)
- Demonym: Ussese(i)
- Time zone: UTC+1 (CET)
  - Summer (DST): UTC+2 (CEST)
- Postal code: 10060
- Dialing code: 0121
- Website: Official website

Usseaux (Occitan: Ussiau, Piedmontese: Usseaux) is a comune (municipality) in the Metropolitan City of Turin in the Italian region Piedmont, located about 50 km west of Turin.

Usseaux borders the following municipalities: Exilles, Chiomonte, Gravere, Meana di Susa, Pragelato, and Fenestrelle. It is one of I Borghi più belli d'Italia ("The most beautiful villages of Italy").
