= Mattie, Piedmont =

Mattie Màtie (Piedmontese) Matiës (Arpitan)
- Comune
- Comune di Mattie
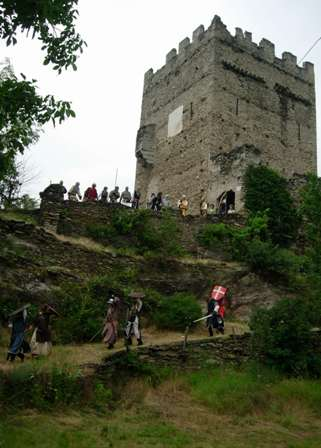
- Fortified house of Menolzio.

- Coat of arms

- Location within Italy Location within Piedmont
- Coordinates: 45°7′N 7°7′E
- Country: Italy
- Region: Piedmont
- Metropolitan city: Turin (TO)

Government
  - Mayor: Francesca Vernetto

Area
  - Total: 27.7 km^{2} (10.7 sq mi)
- Elevation: 730 m (2,400 ft)

Population (30 September 2011)
  - Total: 711
  - Density: 25.7/km^{2} (66.5/sq mi)
- Demonym: Mattiesi
- Time zone: UTC+1 (CET)
  - Summer (DST): UTC+2 (CEST)
- Postal code: 10050
- Dialing code: 0122
- Patron saint: Cornelius and Cyprian
- Saint day: September 16
- Website: Official website

Mattie (Piedmontese: Màtie, Arpitan: Matiës) is a comune (municipality) in the Metropolitan City of Turin in the Italian region Piedmont, located about 45 km west of Turin.

Mattie borders the following municipalities: Bussoleno, Susa, Meana di Susa, Roure, and Fenestrelle.
