= Chiomonte =

- Comune
- Comune di Chiomonte
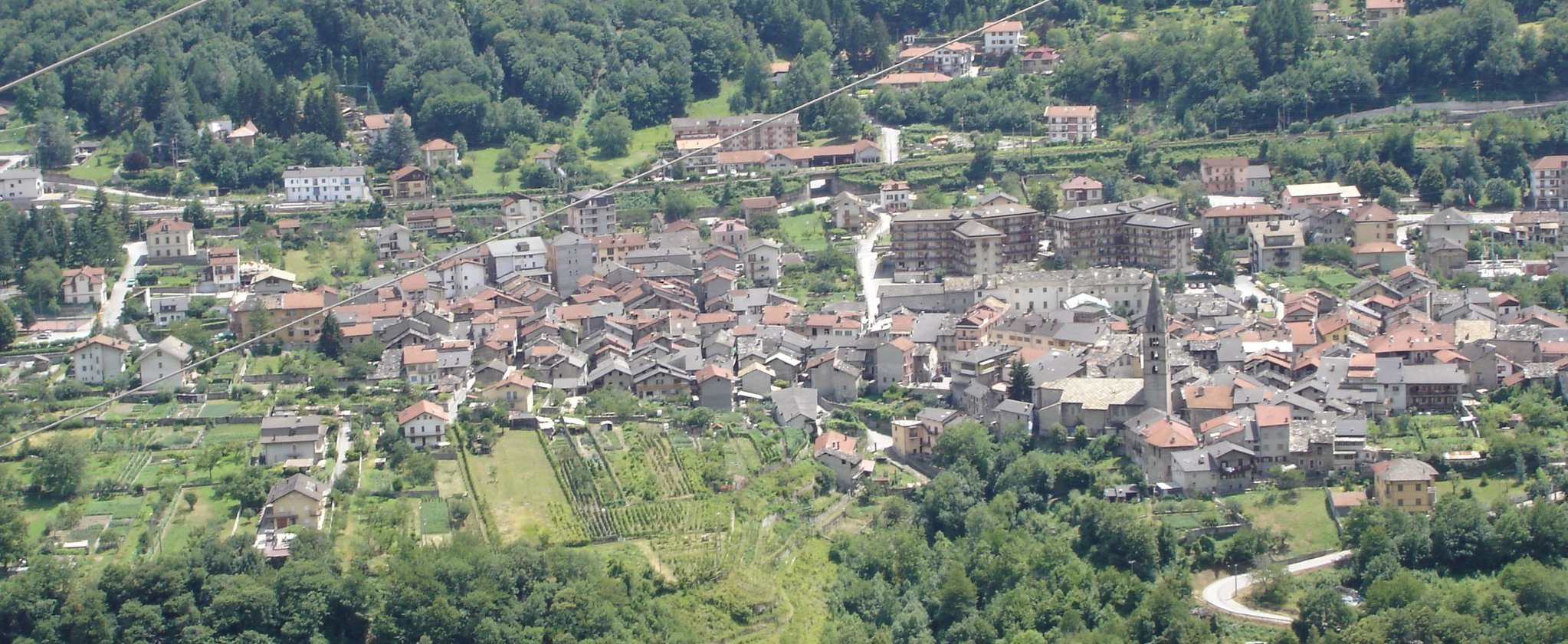

- Location within Italy Location within Piedmont
- Coordinates: 45°7′N 6°59′E
- Country: Italy
- Region: Piedmont
- Metropolitan city: Turin (TO)
- Frazioni: Frais, Ramat

Government
  - Mayor: Silvano Ollivier

Area
  - Total: 26.7 km^{2} (10.3 sq mi)
- Elevation: 750 m (2,460 ft)

Population (30 September 2011)
  - Total: 931
  - Density: 34.9/km^{2} (90.3/sq mi)
- Demonym: Chiomontini or Chiomontesi
- Time zone: UTC+1 (CET)
  - Summer (DST): UTC+2 (CEST)
- Postal code: 10050
- Dialing code: 0122
- Website: Official website

Chiomonte (French: Chaumont, Piedmontese: Cimon) is a comune (municipality) within the metropolitan city of Turin in the Italian region of Piedmont, located about 60 kilometres (37 mi) west of Turin itself. The name of the town derives from the Latin Calcis Mons, which refers to the calcium-rich soil of the area. Before the 8th century, Chiomonte was located on the south side of its present valley but, after a landslide, the town was moved to its present location.

Chiomonte borders the following municipalities: Giaglione, Exilles, Gravere, and Usseaux.

Sights include the 15th-century church of Santa Maria.

Chiomonte is known for its ice wine and is one of the few areas in Italy producing this type of wine.
