= Novalesa =

Novalesa Novalèisa (Piedmontese) Nonalésa (Arpitan) Novalaise (French)
- Comune
- Comune di Novalesa
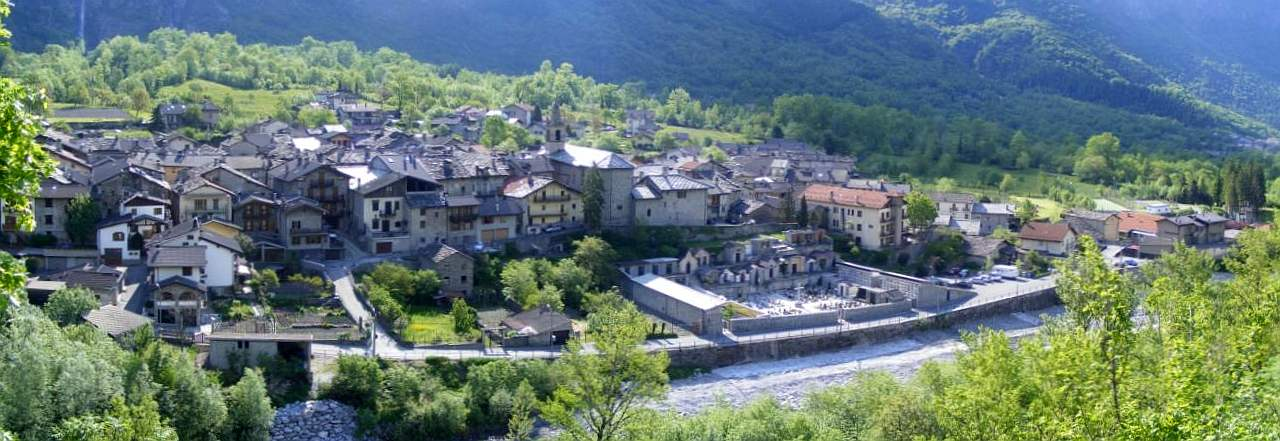

- Location within Italy Location within Piedmont
- Coordinates: 45°11′N 7°1′E
- Country: Italy
- Region: Piedmont
- Metropolitan city: Turin (TO)
- Frazioni: S. Pietro, S. Rocco, Villaretto, Ronelle, S. Anna, Borghetto, S. Maria, Fraita

Government
  - Mayor: Silvano Moscatelli

Area
  - Total: 28.3 km^{2} (10.9 sq mi)
- Elevation: 828 m (2,717 ft)

Population (31 May 2012)
  - Total: 553
  - Density: 19.5/km^{2} (50.6/sq mi)
- Demonym: Novalicensi
- Time zone: UTC+1 (CET)
  - Summer (DST): UTC+2 (CEST)
- Postal code: 10050
- Dialing code: 0122
- Website: Official website

Novalesa (Piedmontese: Novalèisa, Arpitan: Nonalésa, French: Novalaise) is a comune (municipality) in the Metropolitan City of Turin in the Italian region Piedmont, located about 60 km west of Turin, on the border with France. Novalesa borders the following municipalities: Bessans (France), Lanslebourg-Mont-Cenis (France), Mompantero, Moncenisio, Usseglio, and Venaus.

Near the village is Novalesa Abbey, a Benedictine monastery founded in 726. Acting in effect as a forward position for the Franks near their border with the territory of the Lombards, the abbey was strategically placed to control the Via Francigena. The parish church constitutes a site of the Museum of Alpine Religious Art (part of the Diocesan Museum System of Susa).

Near the village there are very high waterfalls, formed by the streams coming from Rocciamelone mountain.

== Twin towns ==
- Le Monêtier-les-Bains, France
