= Meana di Susa =

Meana di Susa Meana (Piedmontese) Meana (Arpitan) Méans (French)
- Comune
- Comune di Meana di Susa
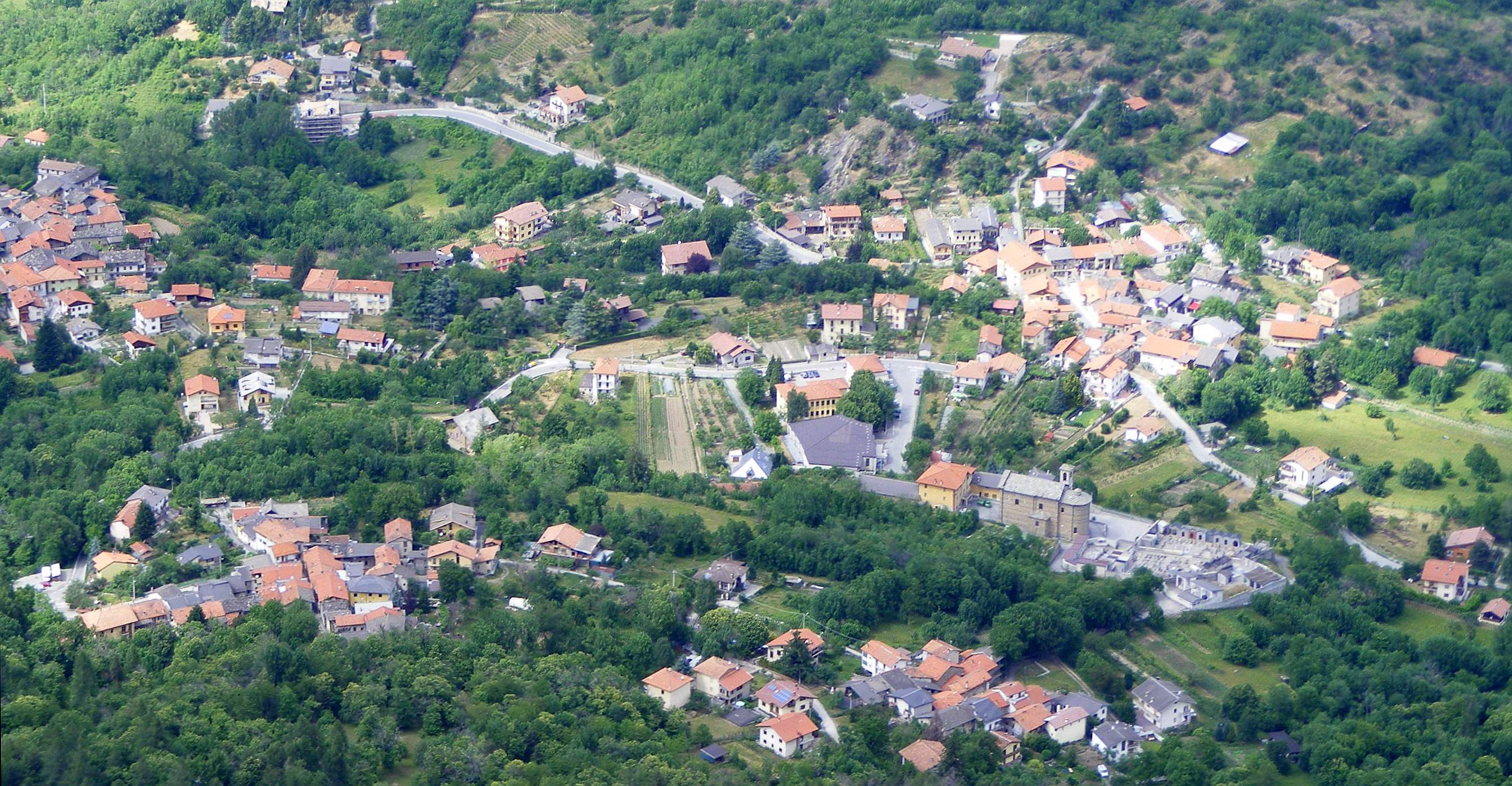

- Location within Italy Location within Piedmont
- Coordinates: 45°7′N 7°4′E
- Country: Italy
- Region: Piedmont
- Metropolitan city: Turin (TO)

Government
  - Mayor: Adele Cotterchio

Area
  - Total: 17.7 km^{2} (6.8 sq mi)
- Elevation: 730 m (2,400 ft)

Population (30 September 2011)
  - Total: 902
  - Density: 51.0/km^{2} (132/sq mi)
- Demonym: Meanesi
- Time zone: UTC+1 (CET)
  - Summer (DST): UTC+2 (CEST)
- Postal code: 10050
- Dialing code: 0122
- Website: Official website

Meana di Susa (Piedmontese and Arpitan: Meana, French: Méans) is a comune (municipality) in the Metropolitan City of Turin in the Italian region of Piedmont, located about 50 km west of Turin. Meana di Susa borders the municipalities of Susa, Gravere, Mattie, Usseaux, and Fenestrelle.

The village name is derived from its original Latin name of Mediana, signifying its location as the midpoint on the road from Paris to Rome. Residents are known as "Meanesi."

From September 1943 until April 1945, Meana served as a hub of the Italian Resistance Movement against the occupying German Nazi Army and their Italian Fascist allies. It is here that Ada Gobetti established her base, from which she coordinated partisan actions.

== Events ==
Each year on the Sunday closest to September 18, the village celebrates the feast of its patron saint, San Costanzo. The festival is centred on the parish church, Santa Maria Assunta. The festival also provides an opportunity for the community to honour the youth who are coming of age.
