= Moncenisio, Piedmont =

Moncenisio Monsnis (Piedmontese) Frere Cenisio (Arpitan) Mont-Cenis (French)
- Comune
- Comune di Moncenisio
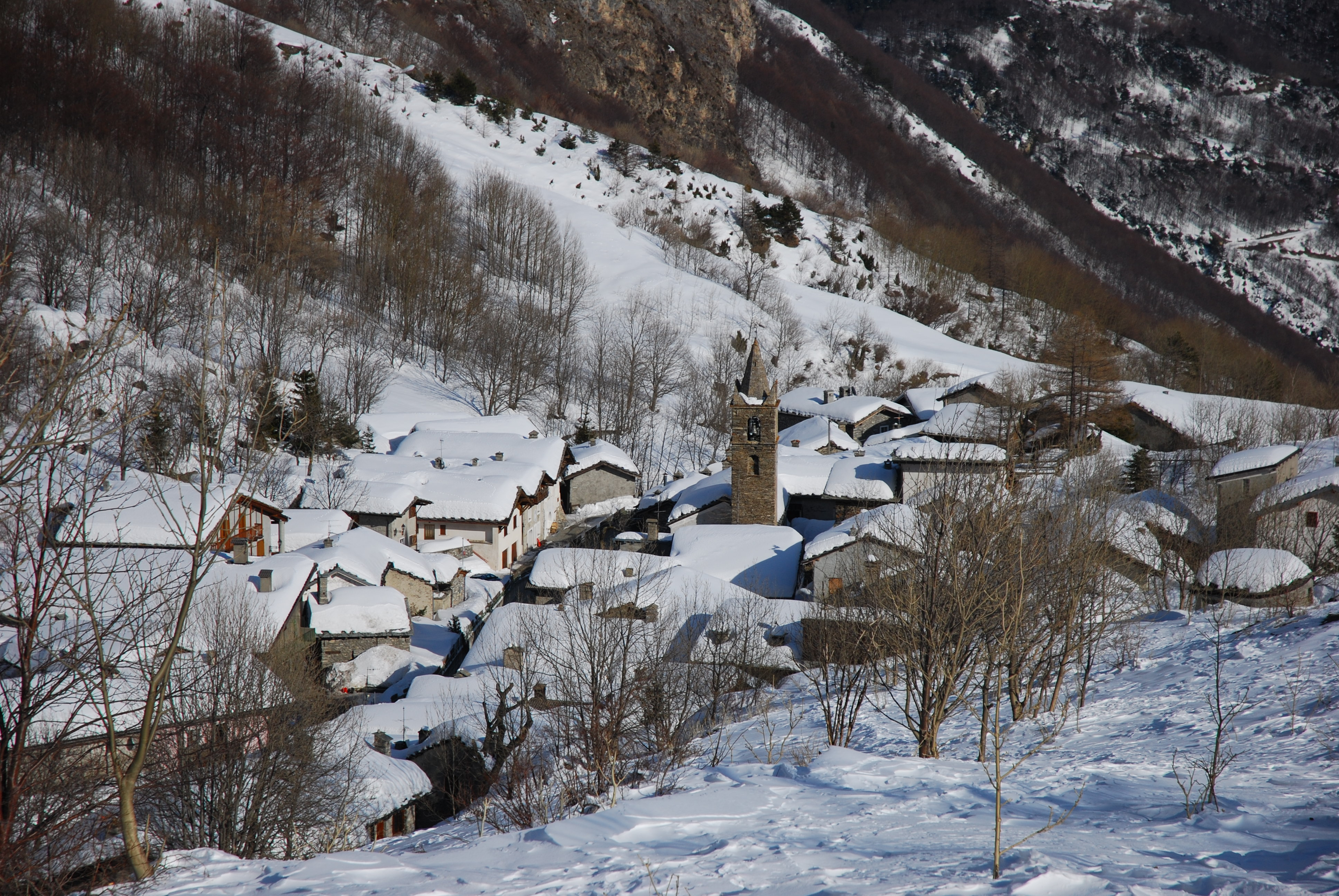
- View of Moncenisio in winter

- Coat of arms

- Location within Italy Location within Piedmont
- Coordinates: 45°12′N 6°59′E
- Country: Italy
- Region: Piedmont
- Metropolitan city: Turin (TO)

Government
  - Mayor: Bruno Perotto (Civic List)

Area
  - Total: 4.50 km^{2} (1.74 sq mi)
- Elevation: 1,460 m (4,790 ft)

Population (1-1-2017)
  - Total: 30
  - Density: 6.7/km^{2} (17/sq mi)
- Demonym: Moncenisino(i) or Ferrerese(i)
- Time zone: UTC+1 (CET)
  - Summer (DST): UTC+2 (CEST)
- Postal code: 10050
- Dialing code: 0122
- Patron saint: St. George
- Saint day: Last Sunday in April
- Website: Official website

Moncenisio (Piedmontese: Monsnis, Arpitan: Frere Cenisio, French: Mont-Cenis) is the smallest comune (municipality) in the Metropolitan City of Turin in the Italian region of Piedmont, located about 60 km (37 mi) west of Turin, on the border with France, in Val Cenischia. Moncenisio borders the following municipalities: Val-Cenis (France), Novalesa, and Venaus.

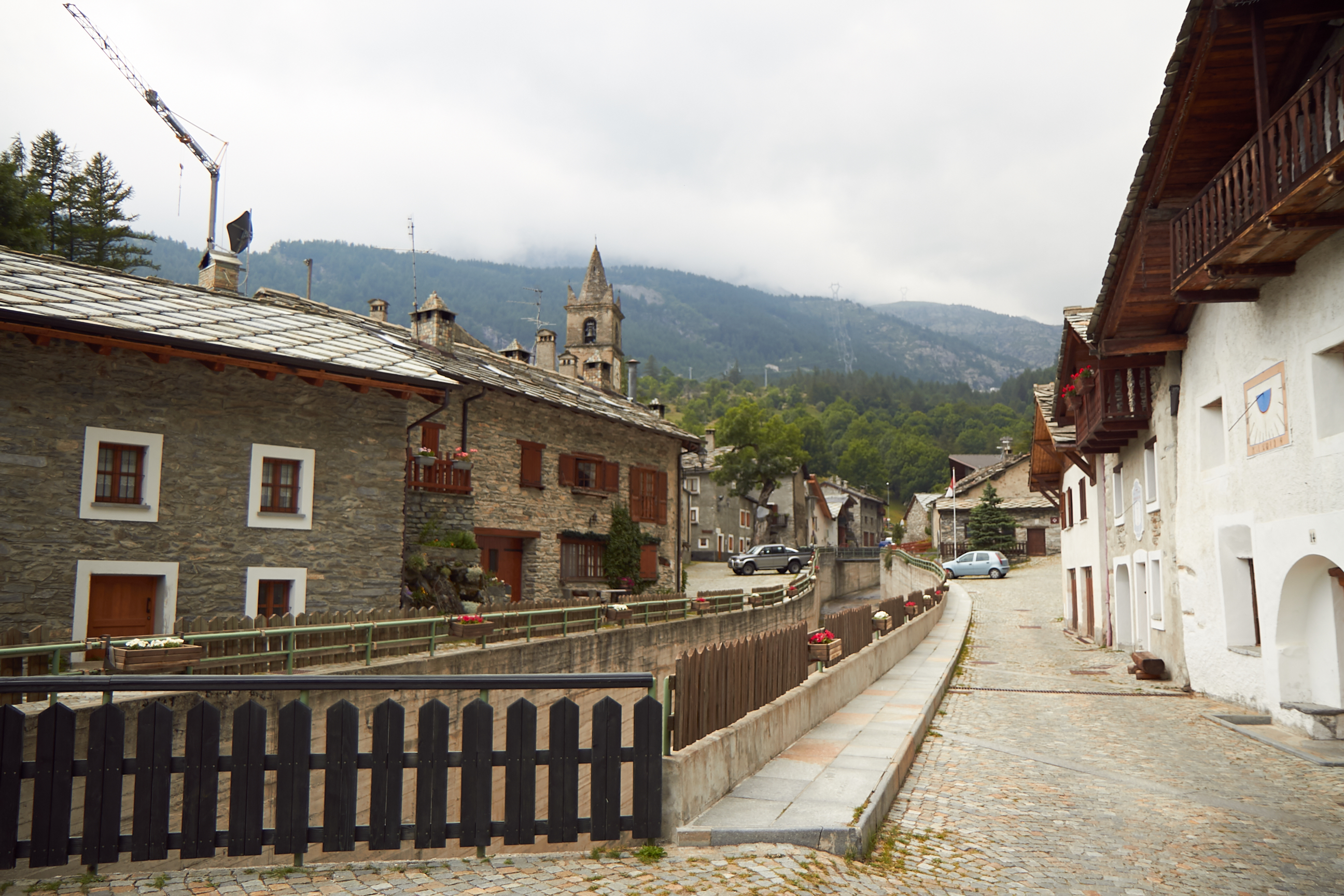
Moncenisio
