= Exilles =

- Comune
- Comune di Exilles
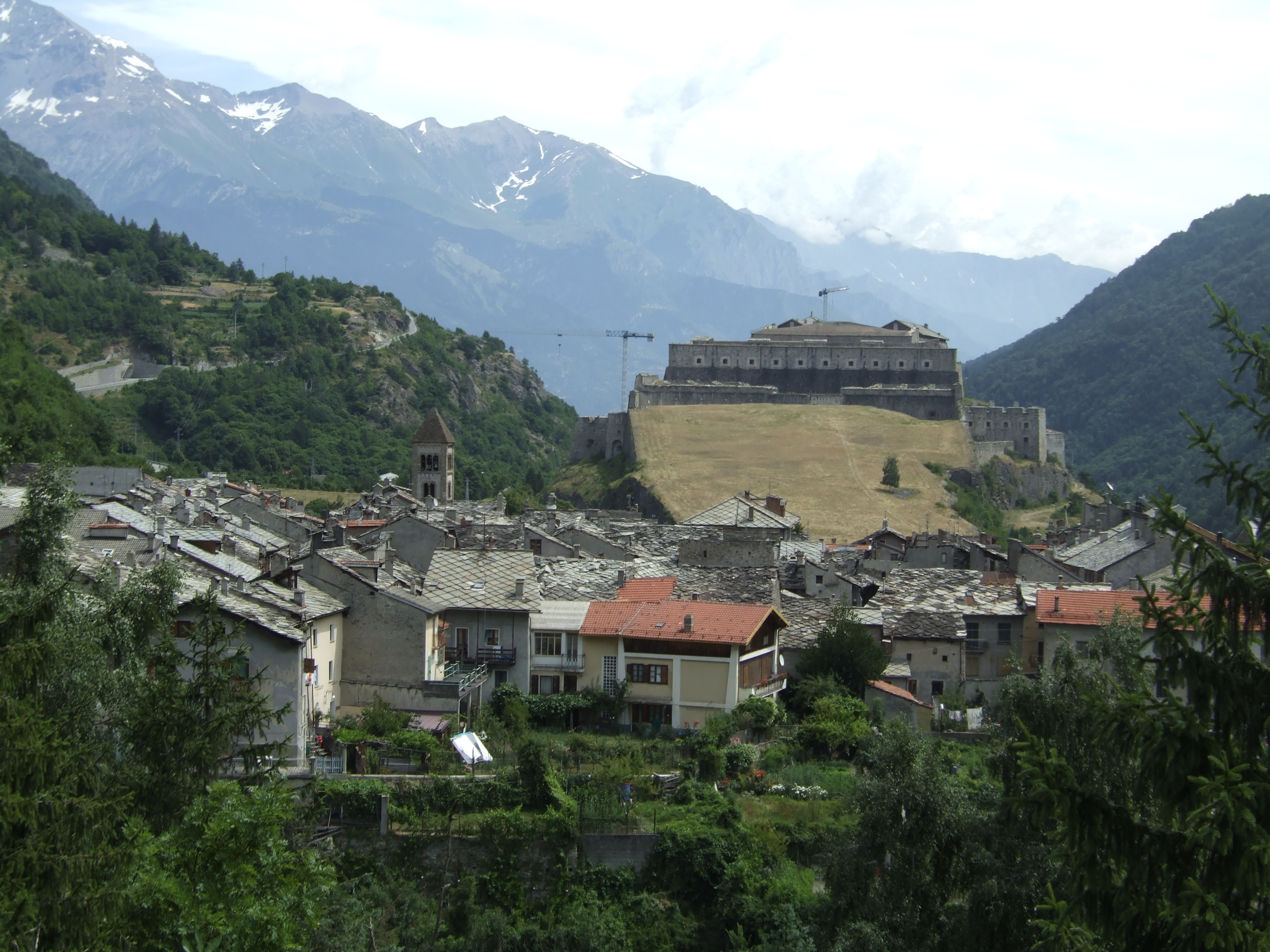

- Location within Italy Location within Piedmont
- Coordinates: 45°6′N 6°56′E
- Country: Italy
- Region: Piedmont
- Metropolitan city: Turin (TO)
- Frazioni: Deveys, Morliere, San Colombano, Champbons

Government
  - Mayor: Michelangelo Luigi Castellano

Area
  - Total: 46.55 km^{2} (17.97 sq mi)
- Elevation: 870 m (2,850 ft)

Population (1-1-2017)
  - Total: 268
  - Density: 5.76/km^{2} (14.9/sq mi)
- Demonym: Esillese(i) or Exillese(i)
- Time zone: UTC+1 (CET)
  - Summer (DST): UTC+2 (CEST)
- Postal code: 10050
- Dialing code: 0122
- Patron saint: Saint Peter
- Saint day: June 29
- Website: Official website

Exilles (Occitan: Eissilhas; nonstandard Occitan: Isiya; Piedmontese: Isiles; Latin: Excingomagus or Scingomagus; Italianization under Italian Fascism: Esille) is a municipality in the Metropolitan City of Turin in the Italian region Piedmont, located about 60 kilometres (37 mi) west of Turin, on the border with France.

It is the location of the Exilles Fort, an alpine fortification which guarded the route between the Kingdom of France and the Duchy of Savoy.

Exilles borders the following municipalities: Bardonecchia, Bramans (France), Chiomonte, Giaglione, Oulx, Pragelato, Salbertrand, and Usseaux.

== History ==
The ancients considered Exilles the first place in Italy coming from Gaul over the Alpine passes. As Scingomagus (Ancient Greek: Σκιγγόμαγος), Exilles is first mentioned by Strabo, who, when speaking of one of the passes of the Alps, says that from Ebrodunum (modern Embrun) on the Gallic side through Brigantium (modern Briançon) and Scingomagus and the pass of the Alps to Ocelum, the limit of the land of Cottius (the Alpes Cottiae) is 159 kilometres (99 mi); and at Scingomagus Italy begins, the distance from Scincomagus to Ocelum being 43 kilometres (27 mi). Pliny the Elder also makes Italy extend to the Alps at Scingomagus, and then he gives the breadth of Gallia from Scingomagus to the Pyrenees and Illiberis.

== Twin towns – sister cities ==
Exilles is twinned with:

- Château-Ville-Vieille, France
