= Giaglione =

Giaglione Dzalhoun (Arpitan) Giajon (Piedmontese) Jaillons (French)
- Comune
- Comune di Giaglione
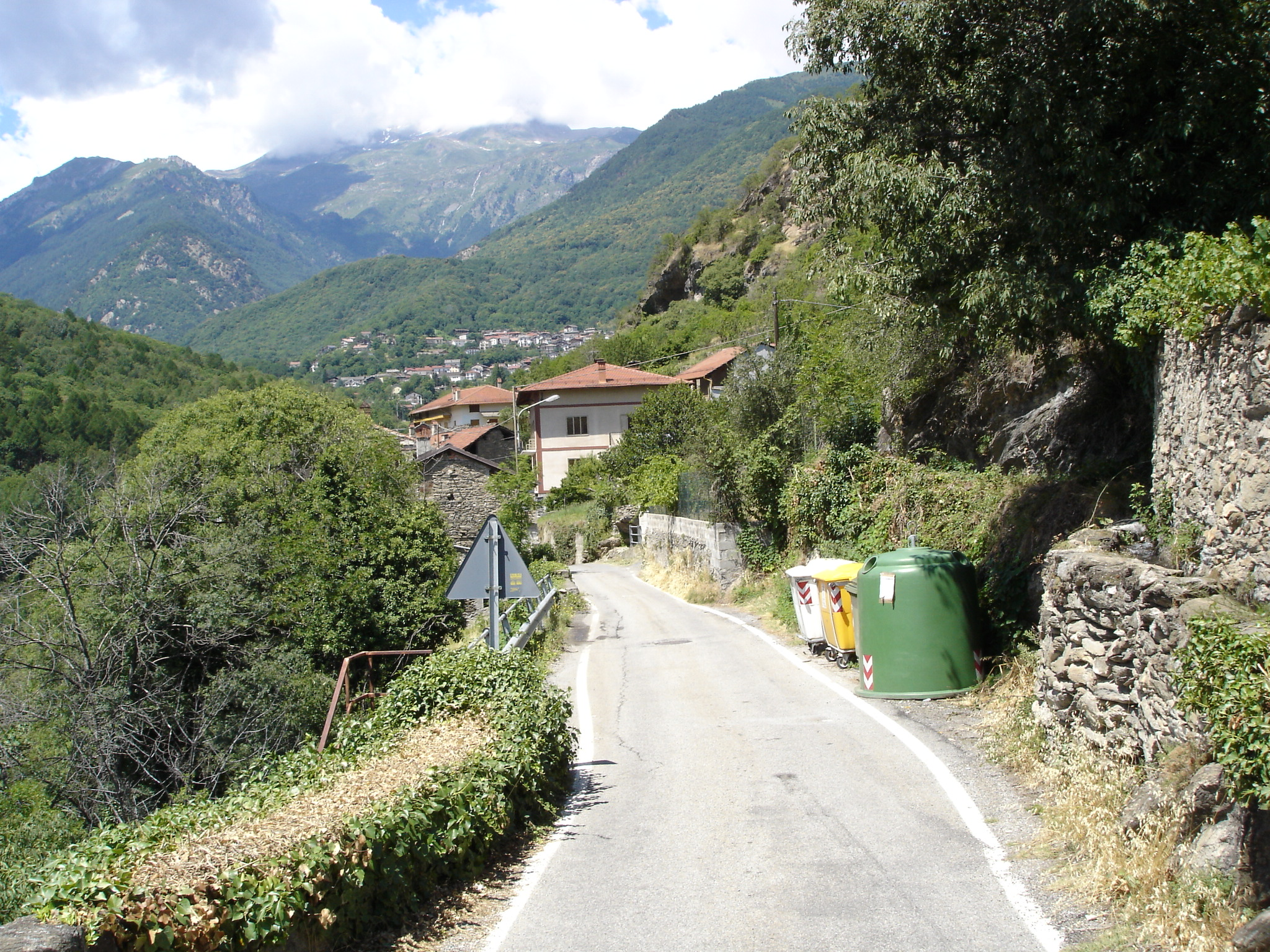

- Coat of arms

- Location within Italy Location within Piedmont
- Coordinates: 45°8′N 7°0′E
- Country: Italy
- Region: Piedmont
- Metropolitan city: Turin (TO)
- Frazioni: Sant'Andrea, Sant'Antonio, San Giuseppe, San Lorenzo

Government
  - Mayor: Ezio Paini

Area
  - Total: 33.6 km^{2} (13.0 sq mi)
- Elevation: 774 m (2,539 ft)

Population (31 August 2017)
  - Total: 616
  - Density: 18.3/km^{2} (47.5/sq mi)
- Demonym: Giaglionesi
- Time zone: UTC+1 (CET)
  - Summer (DST): UTC+2 (CEST)
- Postal code: 10050
- Dialing code: 0122
- Website: Official website

Giaglione (Arpitan: Dzalhoun, Piedmontese: Giajon, French: Jaillons) is a comune (municipality) in the Metropolitan City of Turin in the Italian region Piedmont, located about 60 kilometres (37 mi) west of Turin, on the border with France.

Giaglione borders the following municipalities: Bramans (France), Chiomonte, Exilles, Gravere, Mompantero, Susa, and Venaus. It is home to the scanty remains of a castle and to a chapel housing 15th-century frescoes.

== Twin towns – sister cities ==
Giaglione is twinned with:

- Bramans, France (2010)
