= Venaus =

Venaus Veno (Piedmontese) Veno (Arpitan)
- Comune
- Comune di Venaus
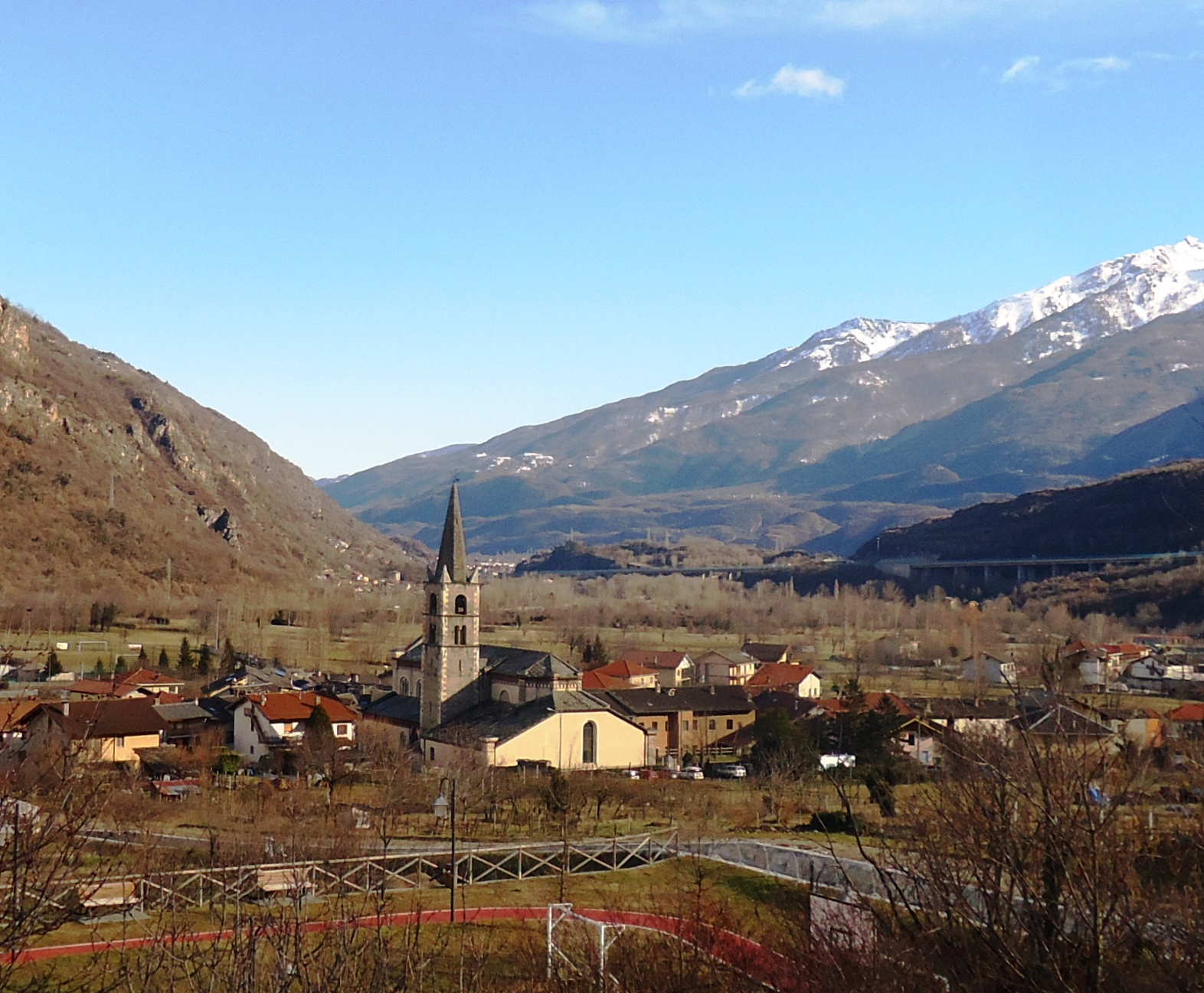

- Location within Italy Location within Piedmont
- Coordinates: 45°9′N 7°1′E
- Country: Italy
- Region: Piedmont
- Metropolitan city: Turin (TO)
- Frazioni: Bar Cenisio, Molaretto

Government
  - Mayor: Avernino Di Croce (Civic List)

Area
  - Total: 19.8 km^{2} (7.6 sq mi)
- Elevation: 604 m (1,982 ft)

Population (1 January 2017)
  - Total: 894
  - Density: 45.2/km^{2} (117/sq mi)
- Demonym: Venausini
- Time zone: UTC+1 (CET)
  - Summer (DST): UTC+2 (CEST)
- Postal code: 10050
- Dialing code: 0122
- Website: Official website

Venaus (Piedmontese and Arpitan: Veno) is a comune (municipality) in Cenischia Valley (Metropolitan City of Turin) in the Italian region Piedmont, located about 50 km west of Turin, on the border with France.

Venaus borders the following municipalities: Bramans (France), Giaglione, Lanslebourg-Mont-Cenis (France), Mompantero, Moncenisio, and Novalesa.

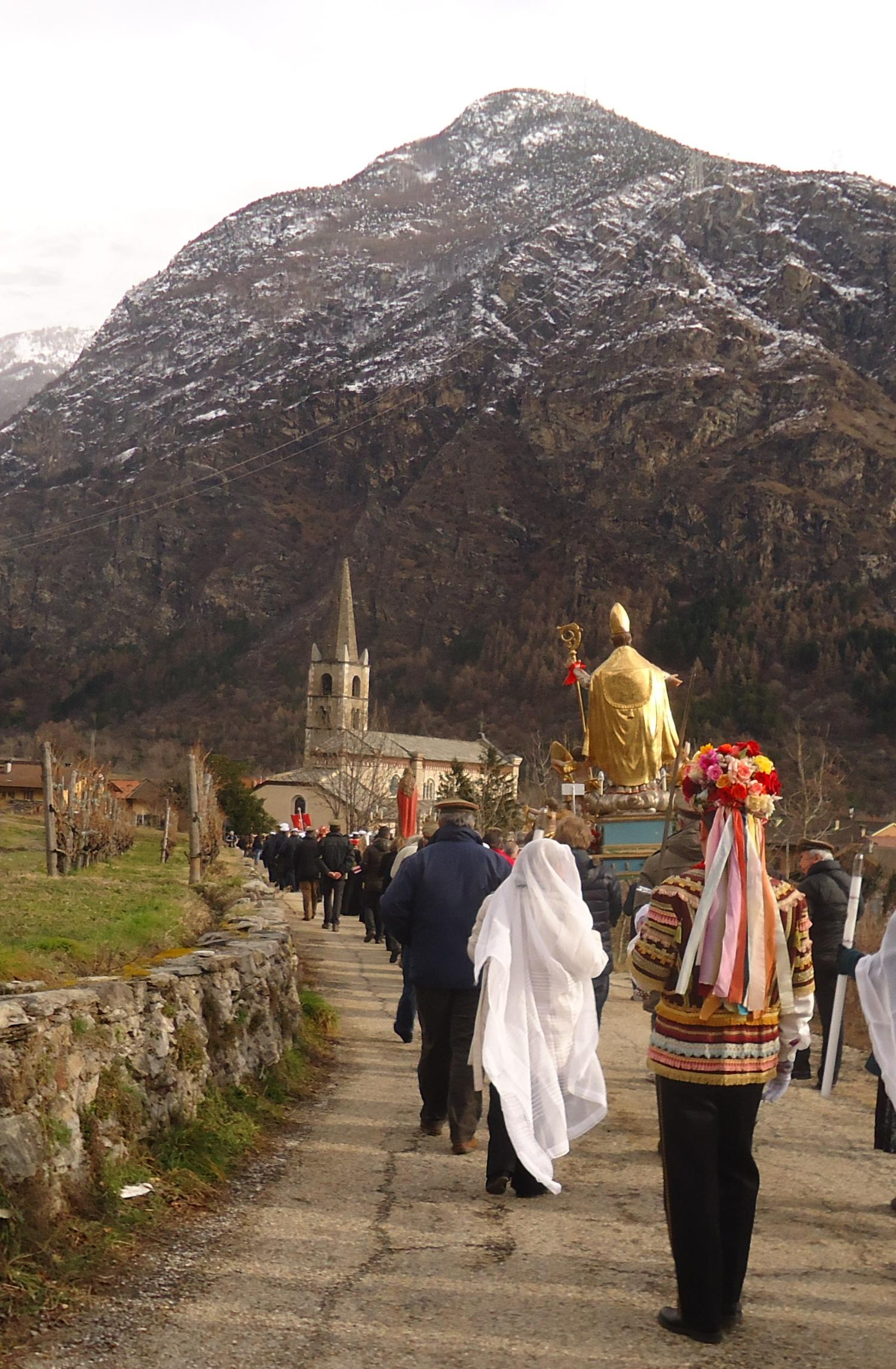
Procession of the statue of the patron St. Blaise accompanied by a traditional spadonaro

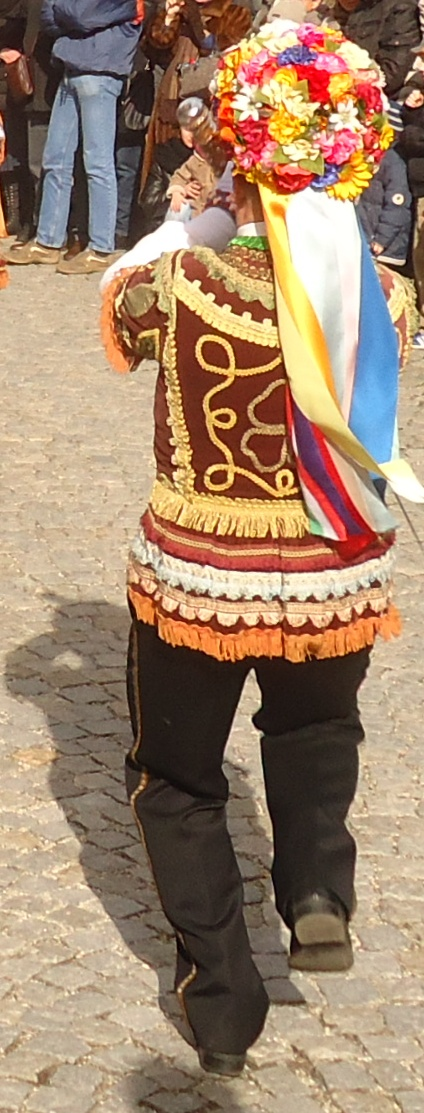
One of the four traditional spadonari during "sword dance"
