= Dora Riparia =

Dora Riparia Doire Ripaire
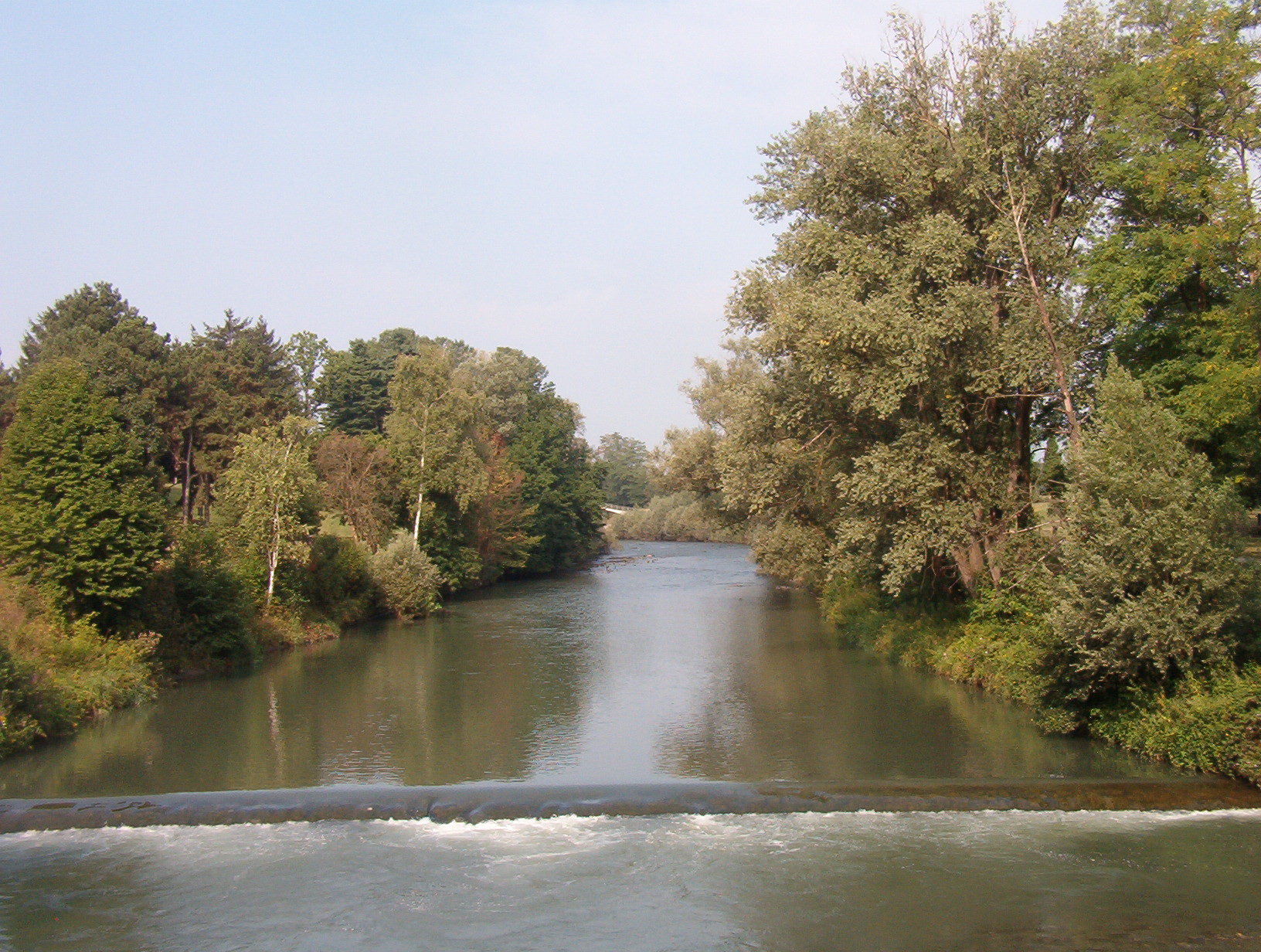
- The river at Turin

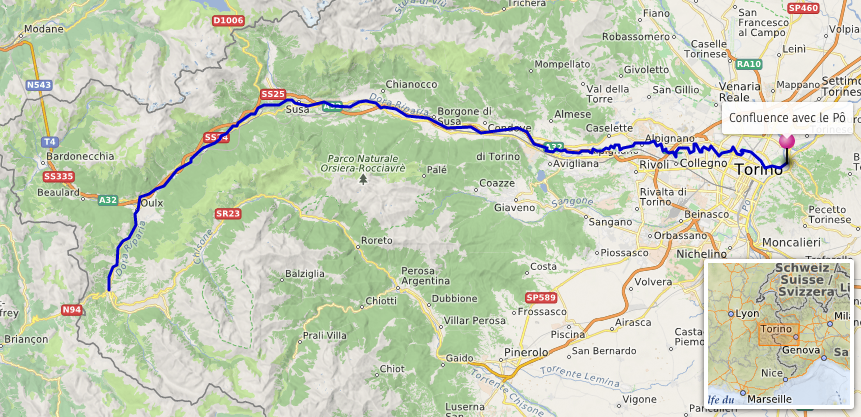
- Dora Riparia location
- Native name: Dòira Rivaira; Dòira (Piedmontese); Dueira (Occitan)

Location
- Countries: France; Italy
- Regions: Provence-Alpes-Côte d'Azur; Piedmont
- Department / metropolitan city: Hautes-Alpes; Metropolitan City of Turin

Physical characteristics
- Source
  - location: Cottian Alps near Col de Montgenèvre
  - elevation: 2,500 metres (8,200 ft)
- Mouth
  - location: River Po, Turin
  - coordinates: 45°4′43″N 7°43′30″E
- Length: 125 kilometres (78 mi)
- Basin size: 1,231 square kilometres (475 mi^{2})
- Discharge
  - average: 25 cubic metres per second (880 cu ft/s)

Basin features
- Progression: Po→ Adriatic Sea
- Tributaries
  - left: Dora di Bardonecchia, Cenischia

The Dora Riparia (Italian: [ˈdɔːra riˈpaːrja]; Piedmontese: Dòira Rivaira or simply Dòira), or Doire Ripaire (French: [dwaʁ ʁipɛːʁ]; also simply Doire; Occitan: Dueira), (Note: Latin: Duria minor.) is an Alpine river, mostly flowing in Piedmont, Northwest Italy as a left-bank tributary of the Po. It is 125 kilometres (78 mi) long (of which 5 km are in Provence-Alpes-Côte d'Azur, Southeast France), with a 1,231 square kilometres (475 sq mi) drainage basin. It originates in the Cottian Alps, close to the Col de Montgenèvre in France, where it is called the Piccola Dora or Petite Doire ("Small Dora"). Its name becomes the Dora Riparia after the confluence with the Ripa in the Argentera Valley and the Thuras de Bousson close to Cesana Torinese.

Further down the valley, in Oulx, the river grows thanks to its main upper tributary, the Dora di Bardonecchia, and before Susa is augmented by the Galambra and Cenischia. After Susa, it only receives minor tributaries: from the left, Gravio by Condove, Sessi by Caprie, and Messa by Almese, from the right Scaglione by Meana and Gravio by Villar Focchiardo. It runs through the Susa Valley, and after having crossed part of the plain of the Po and the territories of the comunes of Avigliana, Alpignano, Pianezza and Collegno, joins the Po at Turin. It is considered a "stream" (torrente) until Susa, and a river (fiume) to Turin.

It was at the confluence of the Dora Riparia and the Po that present-day Turin was founded in Roman times. For a long time, the Dora Riparia was the main source of energy there: already in medieval times its water was collected in canals (duriae) that drove mills, water wheels and other contraptions. In the area between the confluence of Dora Riparia and Stura in the Po, where before the destruction caused by the Battle of Turin in 1706 one could find the Royal Park (Parco Regio), lies today the Parco della Colletta. One of the bridges spanning the river at Turin is Ponte Mosca.

In the 20th century, industrial and urban development significantly degenerated environmental conditions in the river; renovation work did not start until the 1990s. In 1999, the environmental protection agency ARPA (the Regional Agency for Environmental Protection) conducted a study of the entire Dora Riparia and the river Sangone, revealing a condition of serious pollution. Then, in 2002, the agro-natural park of Dora Riparia was born, financed by the comune of Collegno and the region of Po, to preserve the natural habitat, but also to integrate agricultural and river areas.
