= Refuge d'Ambin =

Coordinates: 45°09′50″N 6°51′54″E

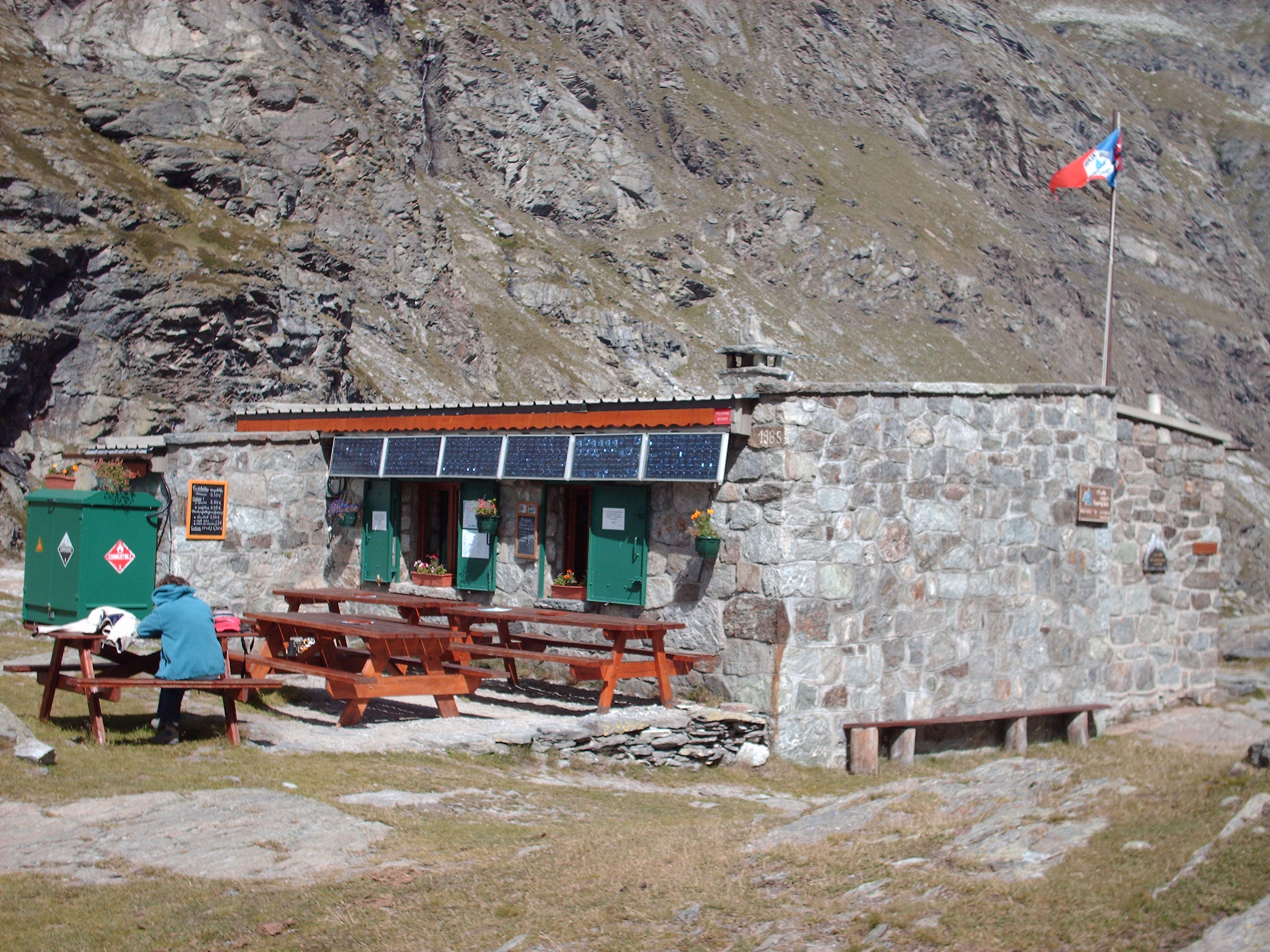
Refuge d'Ambin

Refuge d'Ambin is a refuge in the Alps in France.
