= Bardonecchia =

Bardonecchia Bardonecia (Piedmontese) Bardonescha (Occitan)
- Comune
- Comune di Bardonecchia
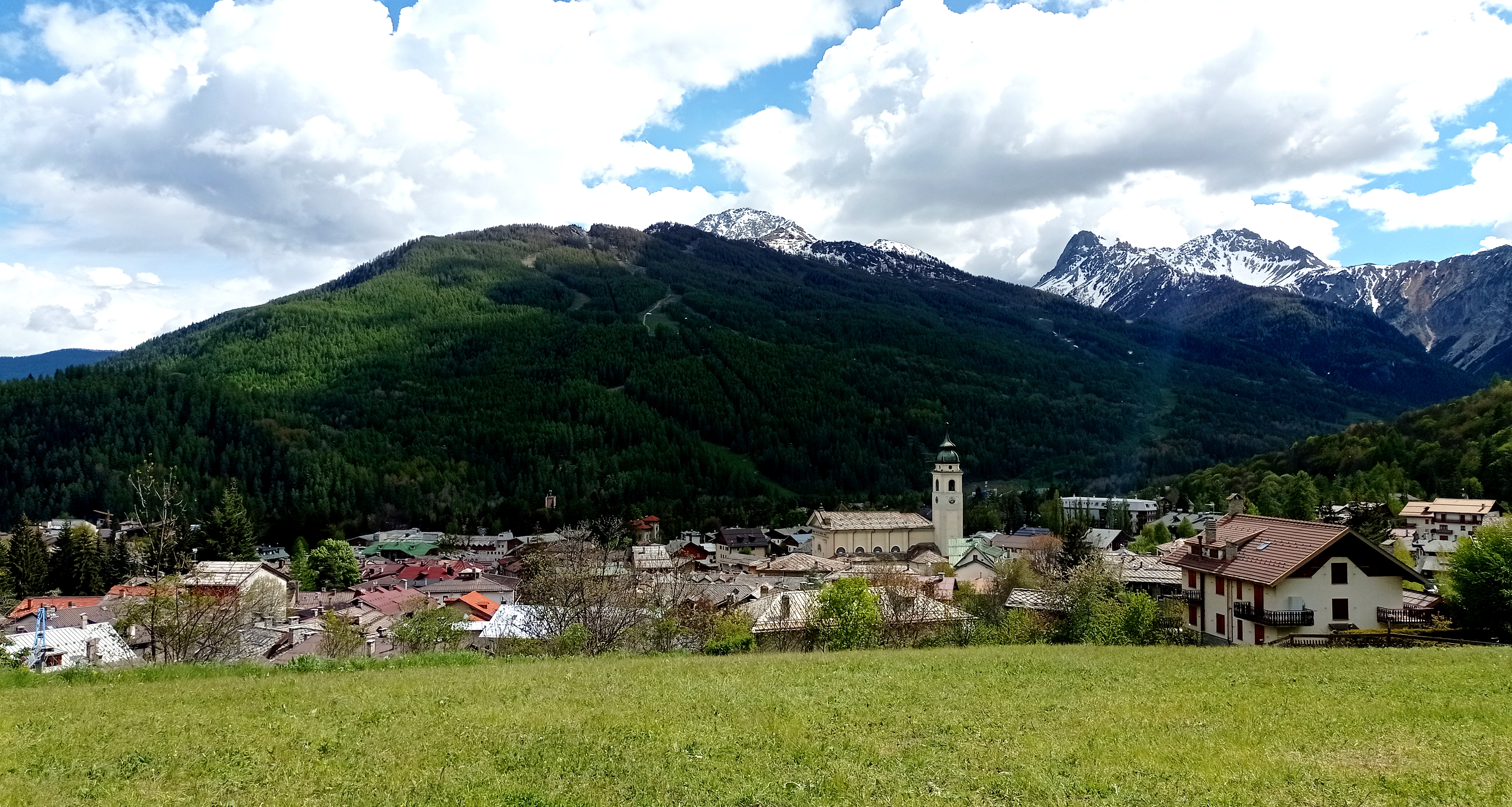

- Coat of arms

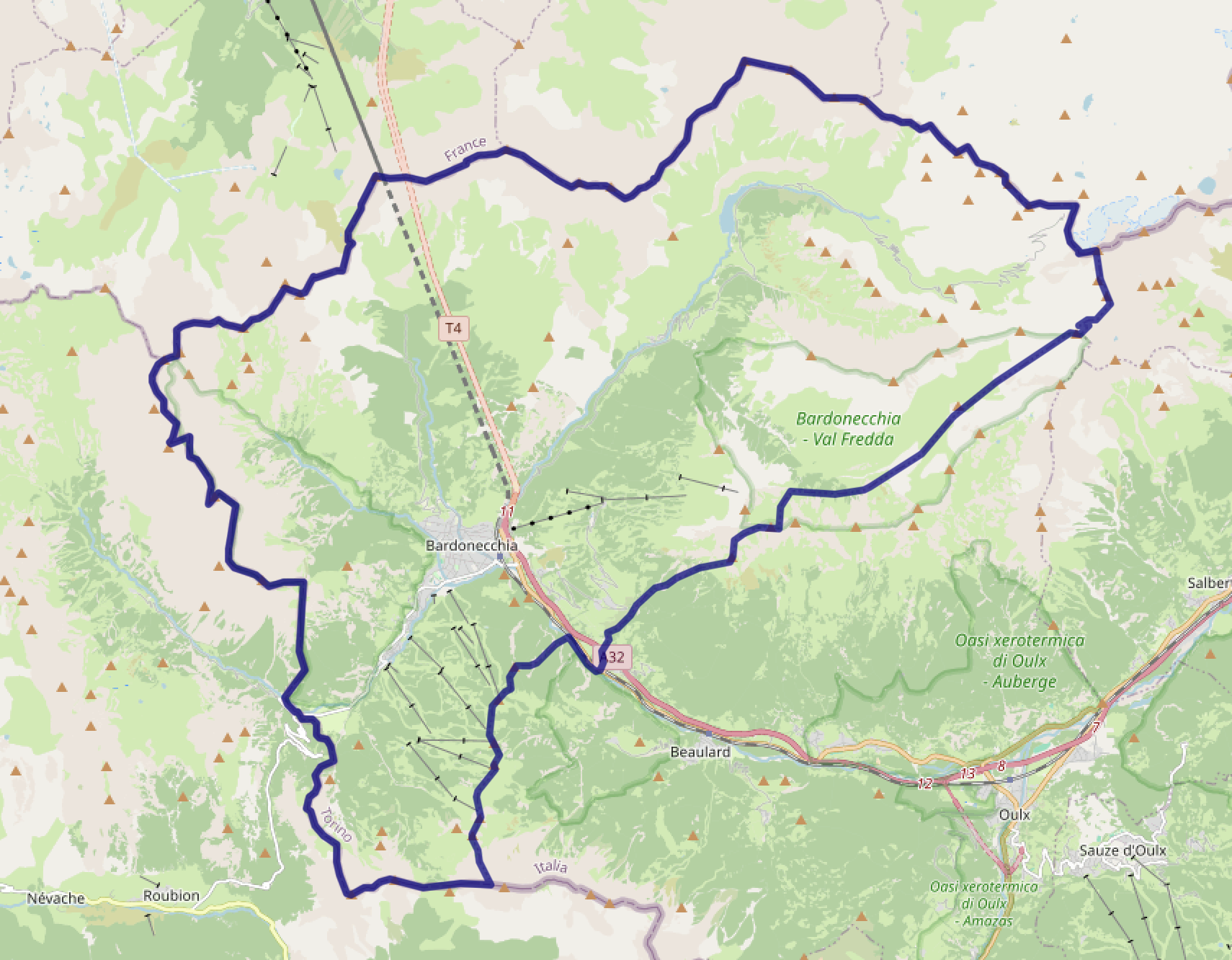
- OSM map of Bardonecchia.

- Location within Piedmont Location within Italy
- Coordinates: 45°5′N 6°42′E
- Country: Italy
- Region: Piedmont
- Metropolitan city: Turin (TO)
- Frazioni: Borgonovo, Bacino di Rochemolles, Gleise, Les Issard, Millaures, Prerichard, Rivaux, Rochemolles

Government
  - Mayor: Chiara Rossetti

Area
  - Total: 132.20 km^{2} (51.04 sq mi)
- Elevation: 1,312 m (4,304 ft)

Population (1-1-2021)
  - Total: 3,096
  - Density: 23.42/km^{2} (60.66/sq mi)
- Demonym: Bardonecchiese(i)
- Time zone: UTC+1 (CET)
  - Summer (DST): UTC+2 (CEST)
- Postal code: 10052
- Dialing code: 0122
- Patron saint: St. Hippolytus
- Saint day: August 13
- Website: Official website

Bardonecchia (Italian: [bardoˈnekkja]; Piedmontese: Bardonecia [bardʊˈnetʃa]; Occitan: Bardonescha [baɾduˈneʃə], French: Bardonnèche) is an Italian town and comune located in the Metropolitan City of Turin, in the Piedmont region, in the western part of Susa Valley. It grew out of a small village with the works for the Fréjus Rail Tunnel, the first crossing the Alps.

The town hosted the snowboarding events of the 2006 Winter Olympics.

== Geography ==
The entrance to the railway tunnel

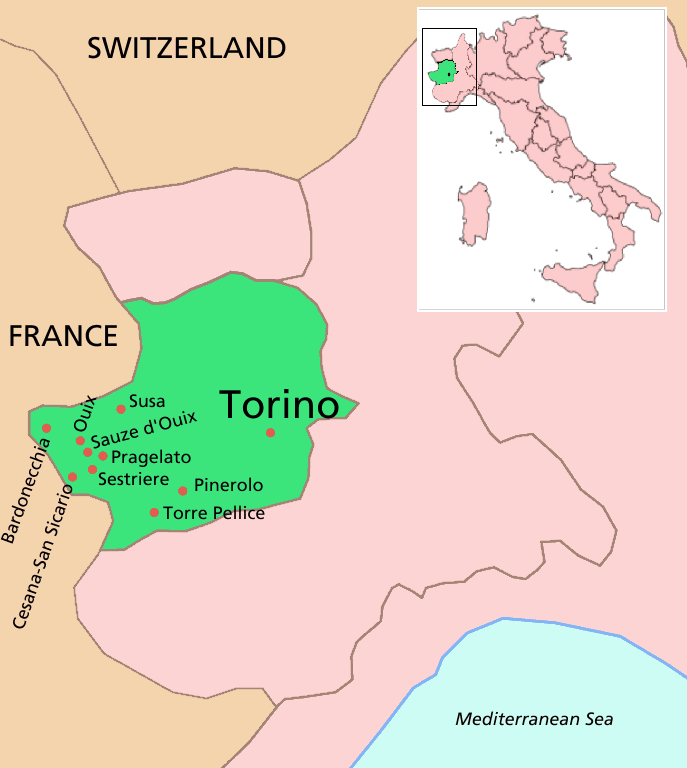
Location of the town shown on the map

The town, which is located about 90 km (56 mi) from Turin at the intersection of four valleys, is surrounded by mountains, including several whose peaks surpass 3,000 m (9,800 ft).

The historic center is set back and elevated (Borgo Vecchio), while the new part of town was built around the train station (Borgo Nuovo). The town has grown thanks to activities related to customs, logistics, and tourism; as a result, it has incorporated some neighboring villages and thus is one of the largest towns in the Susa Valley.

Bardonecchia is at one end of both the Fréjus Road Tunnel and the Fréjus Rail Tunnel, part of a TGV Paris to Milan connection.

The municipality of Bardonecchia contains the frazioni (subdivisions, mainly villages and hamlets) Les Arnauds, Melezet, Millaures, Le Gleise, Beaulard, Grange Horres, La Rho and Rochemolles.

Bardonecchia borders the following municipalities: Avrieux (France), Bramans (France), Exilles, Modane (France), Névache (France), Oulx.

Bardonecchia is the westernmost comune in Italy.

== Sport ==
- Sportroccia—first international rock climbing competition (1985–1989).
