= Province of Turin =

Former province of Piedmont, Italy

Coordinates: 45°4′N 7°42′E

- Province (1847–2014)
- Flag Coat of arms

- Location of the province of Turin within Italy
- Country: Italy
- Region: Piedmont
- Capital(s): Turin
- Comuni: 315

Government
  - President: office abolished

Area
  - Total: 6,821 km^{2} (2,634 sq mi)

Population (03-31-2012)
  - Total: 2,308,409
  - Density: 338.4/km^{2} (876.5/sq mi)
- Time zone: UTC+1 (CET)
  - Summer (DST): UTC+2 (CEST)
- Postal code: 10010-10020, 10022-10026, 10028-10032, 10034-10038, 10040-10046, 10048, 10050-10078, 10080-10088, 10090-10095, 10098-10100
- Telephone prefix: 011, 0121, 0122, 0123, 0124, 0125, 0161
- Vehicle registration: TO
- ISTAT: 001

The province of Turin (Italian: provincia di Torino; Piedmontese: provinsa ëd Turin; French: province de Turin) was a province in the Piedmont region of Italy. Its capital was the city of Turin. The province existed until 31 December 2014, when it was replaced by the Metropolitan City of Turin.

== Geography ==
It had an area of 6,830 km^{2} (2,640 sq mi), and a total population of 2,306,676 (30 June 2011). There were 316 comuni (municipalities) in the province – the most of any province in Italy. The second highest comuni are in the province of Cuneo which has 250. Turin, the former capital of the province, and capital of the present day Metropolitan City of Turin, was the first national capital of unified Italy in 1861.

== Economy ==
The most important export items from the Turin province are automobiles, machinery, and metal products. The province has commercial relations with Germany, France, Poland, Spain, United Kingdom, Romania and Czech Republic. A large quantity of import and export is carried with these nations.

Service is the most important economic sector accounting to 66% of the gross domestic product. The other two important sectors are industry (32%) and agriculture (2%). In order to promote entrepreneurship, the provincial body has started "Start Your Own Business" (Italian: Mettersi in Proprio), an advice service to help aspiring entrepreneurs who have new business ideas.

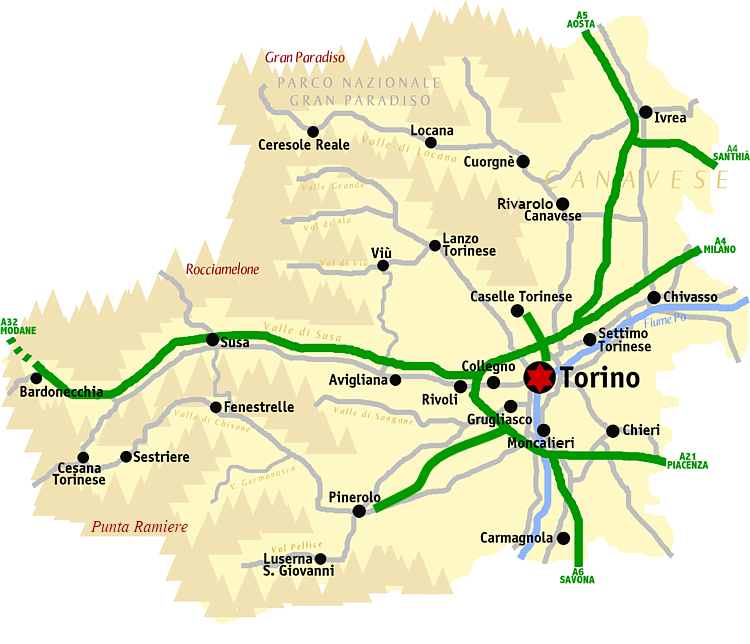
Roadmap of the Metropolitan City of Turin

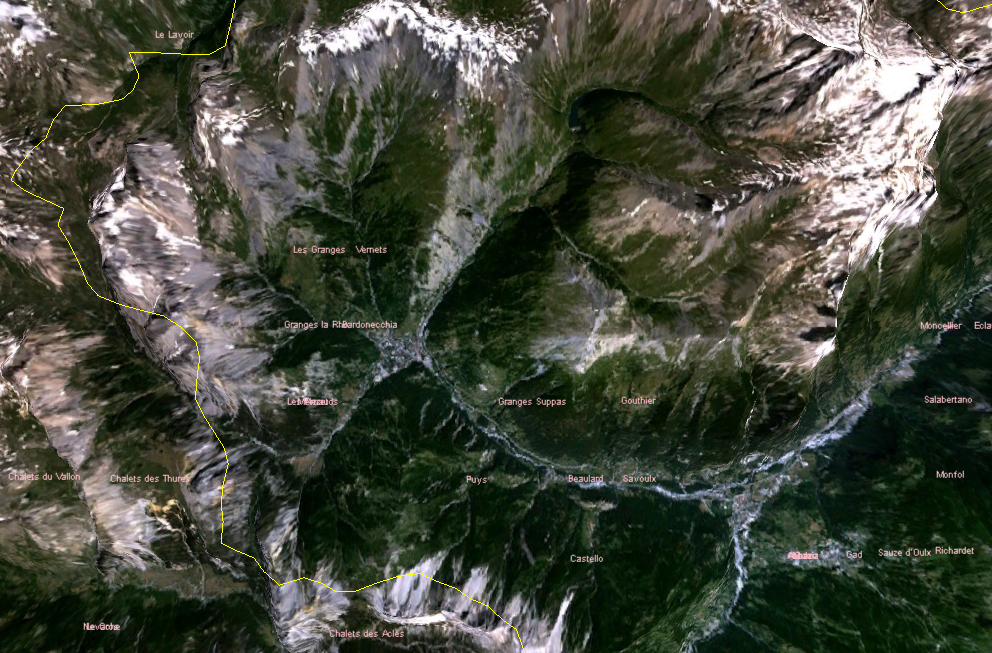
Satellite view of the western region

== See also ==
- Metropolitan City of Turin
- Piedmontese language
- Franco-Provençal language
- Sacro Monte di Belmonte
- House of Savoy
  - Residences of the Royal House of Savoy
- Gran Paradiso National Park
