= Bramans =

Bramans Braman (Savoyard)
- Part of Val-Cenis
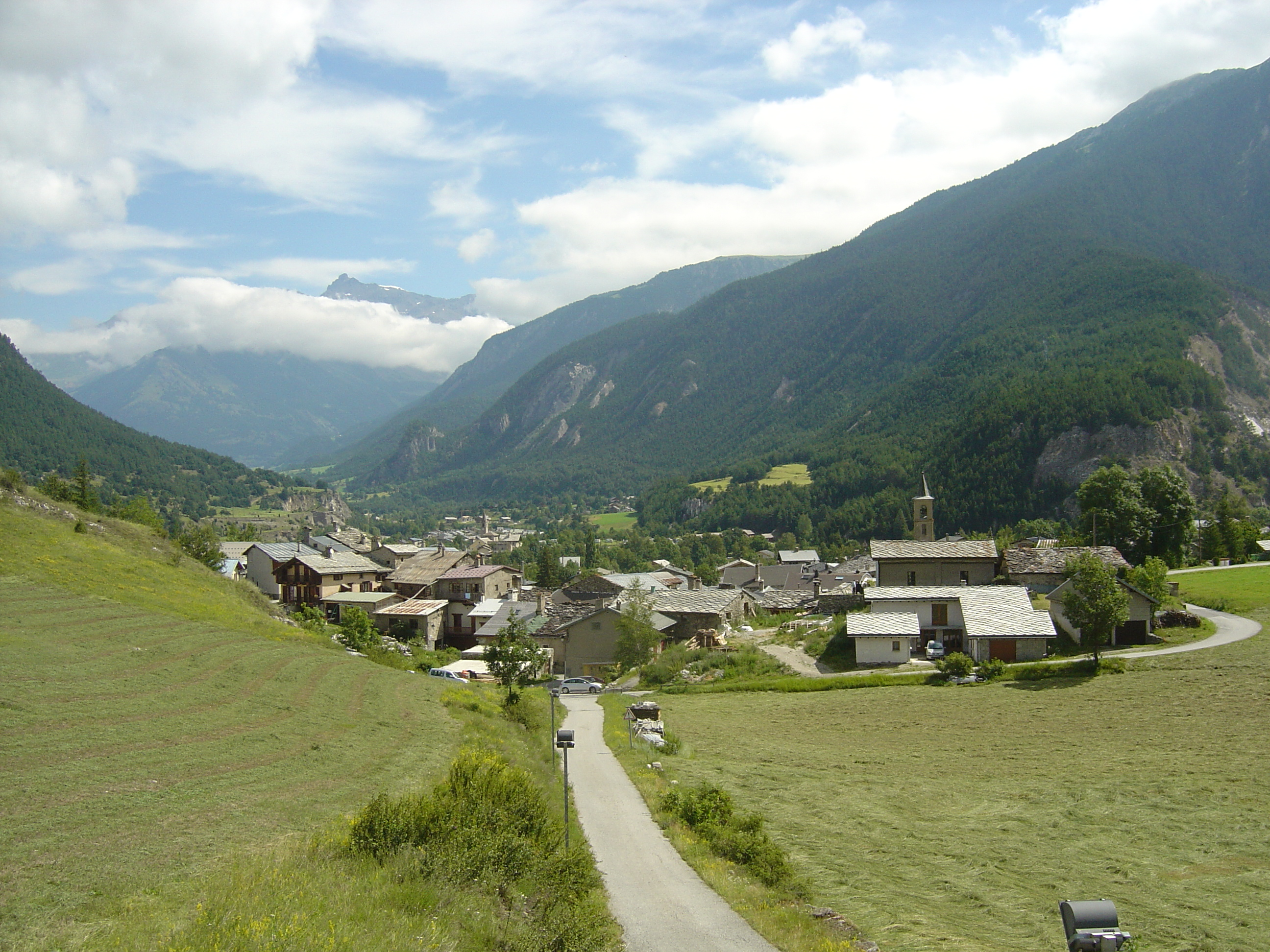
- A general view of Bramans
- Location of Bramans
- Location within France Location within Auvergne-Rhône-Alpes
- Coordinates: 45°13′28″N 6°46′35″E
- Country: France
- Region: Auvergne-Rhône-Alpes
- Department: Savoie
- Arrondissement: Saint-Jean-de-Maurienne
- Canton: Modane
- Commune: Val-Cenis
- Area^{1}: 92.26 km^{2} (35.62 sq mi)
- Highest elevation: 3,378 m (11,083 ft)
- Lowest elevation: 1,194 m (3,917 ft)
- Population (2022): 441
  - Density: 4.78/km^{2} (12.4/sq mi)
- Time zone: UTC+01:00 (CET)
  - Summer (DST): UTC+02:00 (CEST)
- Postal code: 73500
- Website: Bramans.fr
- ^{1} French Land Register data, which excludes lakes, ponds, glaciers > 1 km^{2} (0.386 sq mi or 247 acres) and river estuaries.

Bramans (Savoyard: Braman) is a former commune in the Savoie department in the Auvergne-Rhône-Alpes region in south-eastern France. On 1 January 2017, it was merged into the new commune Val-Cenis.

== Twin towns ==
Bramans is twinned with:

- Giaglione, Italy (2010)

== See also ==
- Communes of the Savoie department
