= Strait of Gibraltar Tunnel =

Planned Europe-Africa fixed link

Coordinates: 35°57′55″N 5°34′24″W

Strait of Gibraltar tunnel
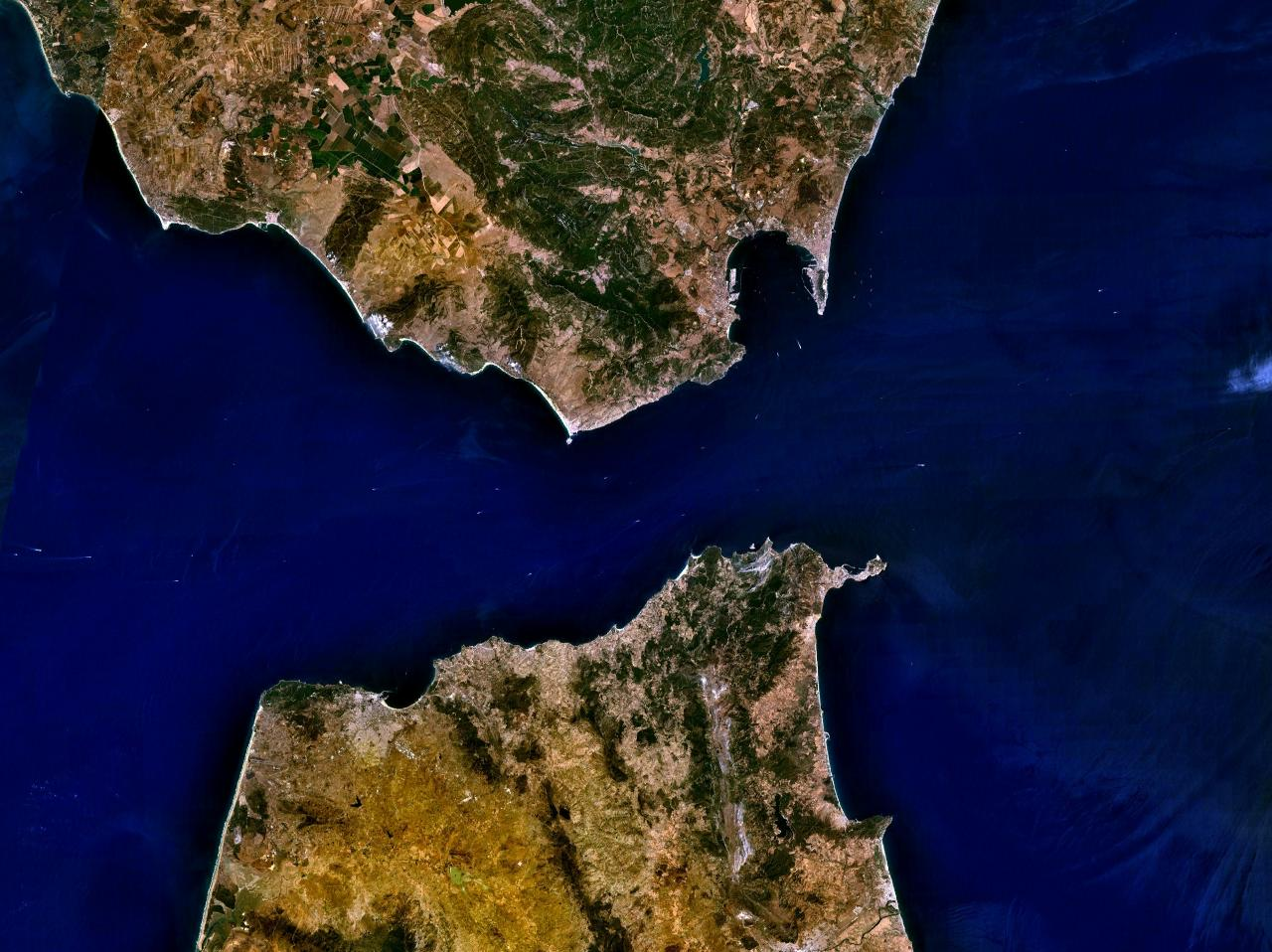
- The Strait of Gibraltar

Overview
- Location: Strait of Gibraltar

Operation
- Work began: 2030 (proposed)
- Traffic: Freight trains and passenger trains
- Character: Twin tube Passenger and freight Third service tunnel

Technical
- Length: 65 km (40 mi)
- Track gauge: Standard (1435 mm) or Iberian (1668 mm)
- Electrified: Electrified 25 kV AC
- Depth below water: 475 metres (1,558 ft)

The Strait of Gibraltar tunnel (Spanish: Túnel del estrecho de Gibraltar, Arabic: نفق جبل طارق) is a proposed rail tunnel spanning the Strait of Gibraltar that would connect Europe and Africa. If built, the tunnel would possibly be the longest railway tunnel in the world, surpassing the Gotthard Base Tunnel and the under-construction Mont d'Ambin Base Tunnel, as well as the longest undersea tunnel, surpassing the Seikan Tunnel.

The Government of Spain created a Commission to study a fixed transportation link to Africa in 1972, and subsequently a government-owned company, Sociedad Española de Estudios para la Comunicación Fija a través del Estrecho de Gibraltar (SECEGSA) under the Ministry of Transport, to develop it. SECEGSA has operated since 1981.

Since the completion of Morocco's first national high-speed rail line from Casablanca to Tangier in 2018, there has been renewed interest in a tunnel that would connect the line to Spain's high-speed network, which uses the same gauge and electrification as the northern section of the Casablanca-Tangier line.

== Background ==
The Strait is up to 900 metres (3,000 ft) deep on the shortest route, but only about 300 metres deep slightly further west, in a region known as the Camarinal Sill; the European and African tectonic plates meet around this area. The shortest crossing is 14 kilometres (8.7 mi). The proposed route across the strait, of 23 kilometres (14 mi), is west of Tarifa in Spain and east of Tangier. Current proposals suggest that the tunnel length would be about 65 kilometres (40 miles) in all, with around 40 kilometres (25 miles) of this length in Spanish territory. The terminals would likely be located at Vejer de la Frontera on the Spanish side and Cape Malabata on the Moroccan side. It is proposed that a connection could be made to the Spanish high speed railway network, which has a line projected to be built from Cádiz to Málaga via Algeciras. Alternatively, a connection could likely be made to the Iberian-gauge Cadiz-Seville railway.

Car ferries have long operated across the Strait of Gibraltar. As of 2023 they were operating on three routes:

- Algeciras – Tangier
- Tarifa – Tangier
- Algeciras – Ceuta

The ferry traffic has an established base of customers, useful to calculate the number of users for a fixed link.

Conversely, the idea has also generated significant criticism over fears such as potential environmental and climate impacts as well as possible conflicts of sovereignty. There have also been fears such a project could aid in illegal migration, particularly as Spain grappled with record numbers of illegal crossings in 2024.

== History ==
The concept of a fixed link crossing the strait has a long history. The political origins of the project arise from the Common Hispanic–Moroccan Declaration of Fez, of 16 June 1979, and signed by the kings of Spain and Morocco. The governments of Spain and Morocco appointed a joint committee to investigate the feasibility of linking the two continents, which resulted in the much broader Euromed Transport project. One consequence of the declaration was the creation in 1981 (45 years ago) of Sociedad Española de Estudios para la Comunicación Fija a través del Estrecho de Gibraltar (SECEGSA), the Spanish government-funded corporation tasked with studying and promoting the crossing.

=== Bridge proposals ===
Several engineers have designed bridges on various alignments and with differing structural configurations. A proposal by Professor T.Y. Lin for a crossing between Point Oliveros and Point Cires featured deep piers, a length of 14 kilometres (9 miles), 910-metre-tall (3,000 ft) towers, and a 5,000-metre (16,000-foot) span, more than twice the length of the current longest bridge span. According to OPAC this bridge would have cost around US$15 billion. A 2004 proposal by architect Eugene Tsui was for a floating and submerged bridge connected at a three-mile-wide (4.8 km) floating island in the middle of the Mediterranean Sea.

=== Tunnel proposals ===
Various tunnels have been proposed. Spain first proposed a modern tunnel under the Strait of Gibraltar in 1930, but a major problem arose when the engineers hired by the Spanish government discovered that the material under the Strait was extremely hard rock, making tunnelling impossible with the available technology. One engineering solution was to fix, using cables, a prefabricated concrete tunnel to the floor of the Strait. This tunnel would have handled both automotive and train traffic. The Strait of Gibraltar is between the African and Eurasian tectonic plates, along the Azores–Gibraltar Transform Fault—one of the most seismically active zones in Europe. Under the seabed, the rock is mostly flysch, packed shale, marl and sandstone that vary in response to mechanical boring.

Adding to the difficulty, at the Camarinal Sill, the tunnel would be about 475 metres below sea level. Seismic monitoring of the zone has been contracted to Tekpam Ingeniería with technical input from the US Geological Survey and continues in 2026.

A 2008 geological study cast doubt on the tunnel's feasibility. In March 2009, a contract was issued for a joint system linking the Moroccan Société Nationale d'Etudes du Détroit de Gibraltar (SNED) with its Spanish counterpart SECEGSA. A three-year study for a railway tunnel was announced in 2003. SNED and SECEGSA commissioned several seabed surveys.

A report on the feasibility of the tunnel was presented to the European Union in 2009. A further project study is under development by a group of specialist consultants from SYSTRA, Amberg and COWI.

=== Planning ===
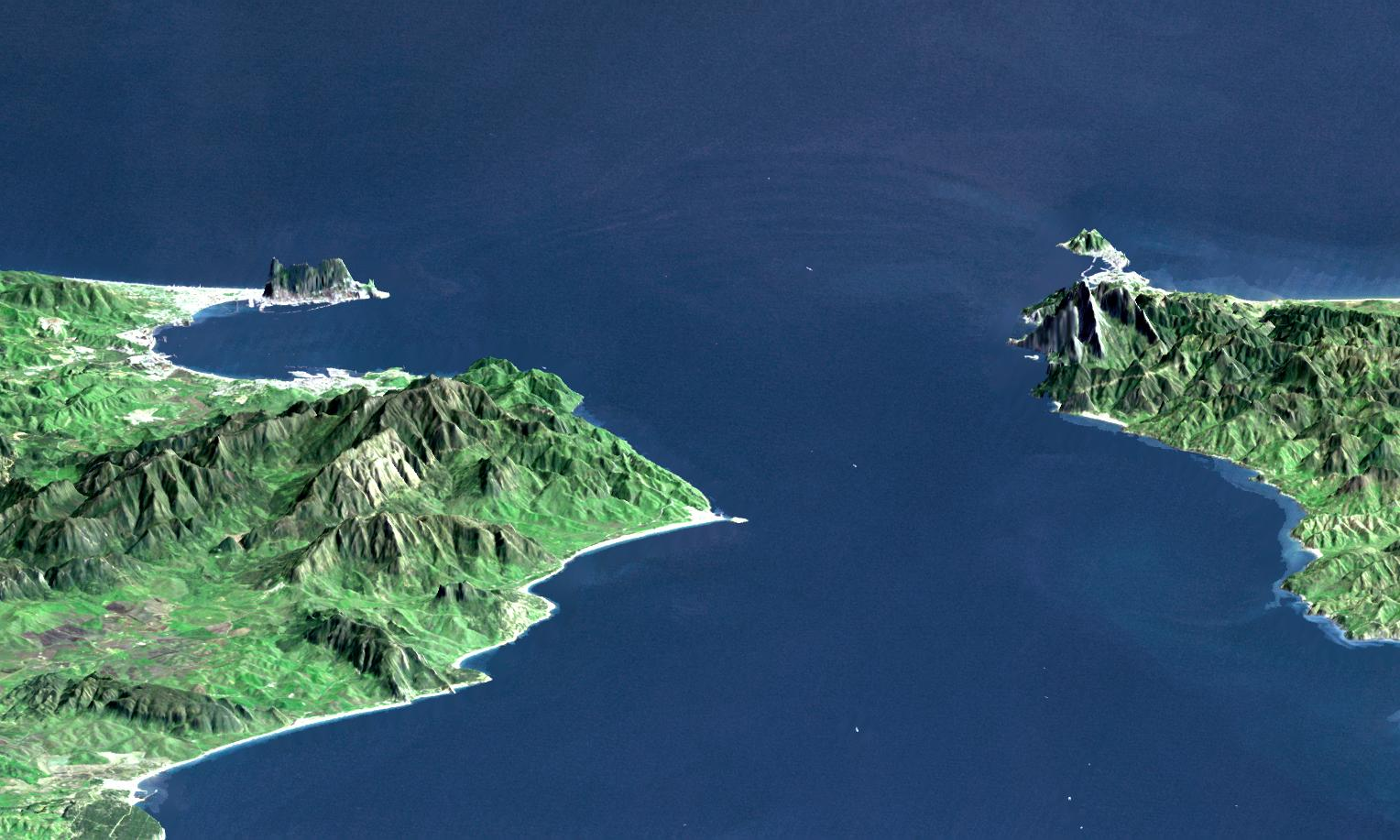
Looking east over the Strait of Gibraltar, with Morocco (south) on the right and Spain (north) on the left

In December 2003, Spain and Morocco agreed to explore the construction of an underwater rail tunnel to connect their rail systems. The tunnel would have linked Cape Malabata near Tangier with Punta Paloma in the El Estrecho Natural Park 40 kilometres (25 mi) west of Gibraltar. No official figures about the cost of the project had been announced by 2007, but previous estimates exceeded €5 billion.

In January 2021, it was reported that the United Kingdom and Morocco would discuss building the crossing between Gibraltar and Tangier.

In February 2023, after a high-level bilateral meeting between Spain and Morocco, the Moroccan and Spanish governments resolved to relaunch the project for an undersea railway tunnel under the Strait of Gibraltar. The project is planned to start construction in 2030. In June 2023, the Spanish government announced a €2.3 million funding package for a joint Spanish–Moroccan design and planning committee for the tunnel. The tunnel would connect the southern end of Spain's national high-speed train network with the northern end of the recently constructed Al Boraq high-speed line from Casablanca to Tangier – the first high-speed rail line in Africa.

In December 2025, German tunneling company Herrenknecht released a study confirming the technical feasibility of the project from an engineering perspective, estimating the cost of construction to be around €8.5 billion and that initial construction could begin in 2030, with major milestones completed sometime between 2035 and 2040. Engineering consultancy company INECO (Ingeniería y Economía del Transporte) was awarded a contract to update the technical design and plan for initial geological explorations, with a decision on whether to proceed with the construction of an initial exploratory tunnel expected to be made as soon as 2027. However, this design contract was challenged in court by the Spanish Association of Business and Engineering Consultancies, which claimed that the direct awarding of the contract to INECO was anticompetitive and called for its re-awarding using an open tender process.

== Project ==
The proposed rail tunnel would have a length of 65 kilometres (40 mi) and be up to 475 metres (1,558 ft) below sea level; and its construction would take 10 years. As of 2026, the planned tunnels consist of a twin-bore railway tunnel plus a service tunnel between the rail bores. The path of the tunnels would include a submarine section of between 27.7 and 40 kilometres. The tunnels would link Punta Paloma near Tarifa (Cádiz province, Spain) to Malabata near Tangier (Morocco).

An earlier plan was to link the two continents via the narrowest part of the strait, about 14 kilometres (8.7 mi) wide, but this idea was dismissed as the tunnel would be 900 metres (3,000 ft) below sea level. Instead, the tunnel will pass through the Camarinal Sill, which has a comparatively shallow depth of 280 metres (920 ft). For comparison, the current deepest undersea tunnel, the Norwegian Ryfylke Tunnel, is 291 metres (955 ft) below sea level. A tunnel deeper than Ryfylke is under construction, also in Norway; Rogfast will be 27 kilometres (17 mi) long and 392 metres (1,286 ft) deep and is expected to be completed in 2033, costing €2.5 billion.

In late 2006, Lombardi Engineering Limited, a Swiss engineering and design company, was retained to draft a design for a railway tunnel. According to the company, the main differences between the construction of this tunnel and that of the Channel Tunnel, linking France and Great Britain, are the depth of the sea and the geological conditions. The area under the Strait is less stable than that under the English Channel. An active major geologic fault, the Azores–Gibraltar Transform Fault, bisects the Strait, and severe earthquakes have occurred in the area. The presence of two deep Quaternary clay channels in the middle of the Strait makes construction complex, causing doubts about the feasibility of the project and proposals for an exploratory tunnel.

As of January 2026, the starting point on the Spanish side is planned to be near the town of Vejer, with a double-tracked connection to the Cadiz-Seville rail line and a single-tracked branch towards Algeciras. In March 2026, Spain allocated €1.73 million for state company SECEGSA for the 2026 financial year bringing the total Spanish public funding since 2022 to €9.61 million. Official estimates point to 2035–2040 commissioning period depending in part on an updated preliminary design expected in the summer of 2026. A tender for an exploratory tunnel is expected in 2027.

The construction of terminals, similar to the Eurotunnel Folkestone Terminal and Eurotunnel Calais Terminal at either end of the Channel Tunnel, might be required for transshipment of road vehicles.

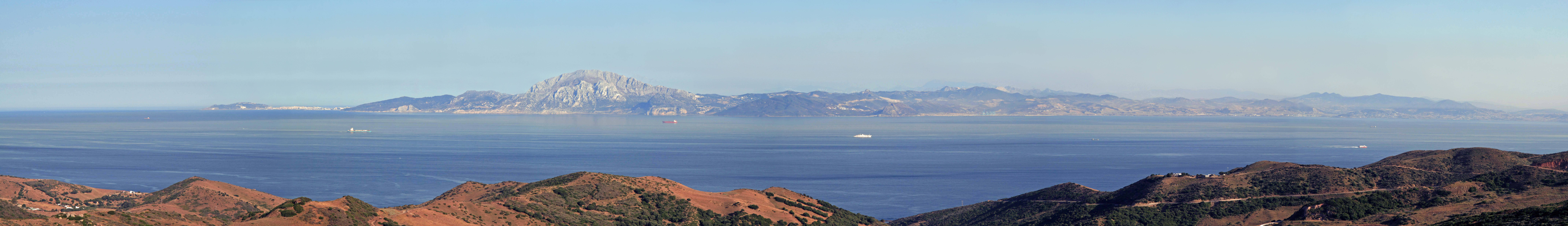
Looking South from Mirador del Estrecho viewpoint in Spain overlooking the Strait of Gibraltar. Pictured to the left is Ceuta, a Spanish exclave, and to the right (out of the picture) is Tangier.

== Funding and strategic impact ==
An estimated capacity of 12.8 million passengers and over 13 million tonnes of freight per year could result from the project once complete. However, the construction costs are estimated at more than €15 billion. Financing is expected to be shared between Spain, Morocco and the European Union, potentially from the Recovery and Resilience Facility and cohesion funding, though no formal European Union commitment has been made.

== See also ==
- Atlantropa
- Extreme Engineering
- Marmaray
- Rogfast
- Morocco–Spain border
- Morocco–Spain relations
- Transport in Morocco
- Transport in Spain
- Intercontinental and transoceanic fixed links
- Maghreb-Europe Gas Pipeline – Natural gas pipeline linking Africa and Europe
