= Cala Arenas =

Beach in Andalusia, Spain

Coordinates: 36°03′37″N 5°26′47″W

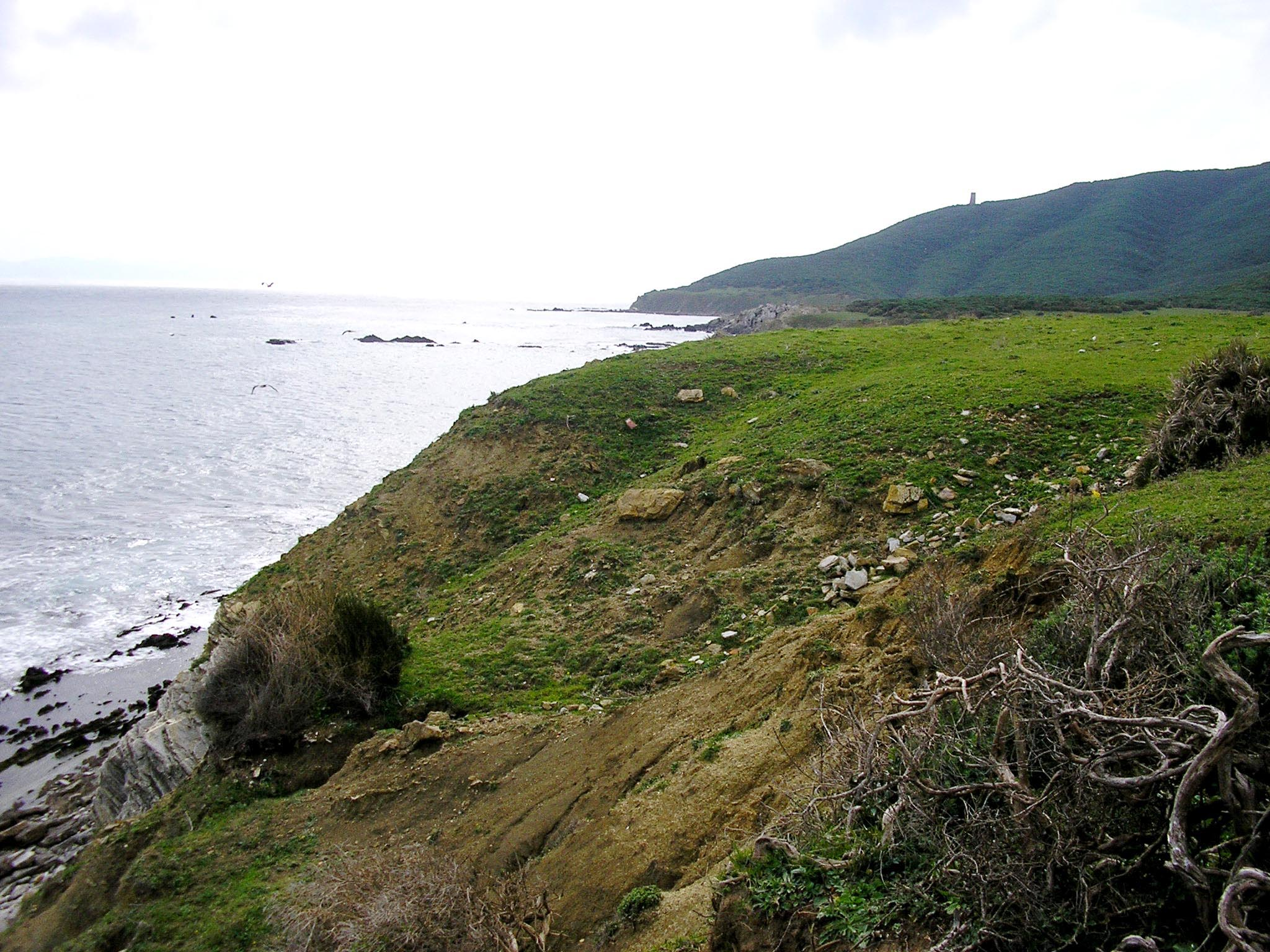
Cala Arenas, with the Torre de Los Canutos visible in the background

Cala Arenas is a beach situated near the city of Algeciras in Spain, within the El Estrecho Natural Park. It is located at the southern end of the Bay of Gibraltar and faces the Strait of Gibraltar. It measures about 400 metres (1,300 ft) long by about 30 metres (98 ft) deep. The beach is somewhat difficult to access, but can be reached via coastal paths from Punta Carnero and Punta del Fraile. It consists of a series of three small coves of similar appearance, with beaches of rocks and small stones. Both the terrestrial and marine environment of the area lies within the natural park. Its surroundings are largely undisturbed by human activity; the nearest settlement is the coastal community of Getares, a small outlying development of the city of Algeciras located about 1 km to the north. The beach is framed by cliffs and the Isla de las Palomas (Pigeon Island) lies a short distance offshore.

Geologically Cala Arenas is located within the Algeciras-Los Nogales unit and is part of the Baetic System in the Campo de Gibraltar. The local rocks are mainly composed of flysch comprising marl, sandstone and mica, locally known as the Algeciras Flysch, that dates from the Eocene–Oligocene period. The rocks include various soft minerals, especially clays, marl, calcarenite and sandstones, that have eroded to leave behind the harder limestones and thus form the chain of alternate coves at Cala Arenas.

Several notable archaeological sites are located near Cala Arenas. The area has been inhabited for thousands of years, the result of its strategic position in the Strait of Gibraltar and the easy landing place that it has represented historically. A small Phoenician port existed there, probably with a watchtower. A medieval defensive structure called the Recinto del Cerro de la Horca stood nearby, as did a 16th-century watchtower, the Torre del Fraile. The 18th century Fuerte de San Diego was also situated in the area but was destroyed in 1811 by British troops from Gibraltar, who sought to prevent the French using it during the Peninsular War.
