= LTF =

LTF may stand for:

- Lateral tegmental field, the source of several neural pathways in the brain
- Lactoferrin, a multifunctional protein found in milk and mucus
- Leading the Future, a pro-AI super PAC
- Lyon Turin Ferroviaire, former developer of a future rail link between Lyon and Turin
