= Bay of Tangier =

Bay on the Mediterranean in northern Morocco

Coordinates: 35°47′28″N 5°46′58″W

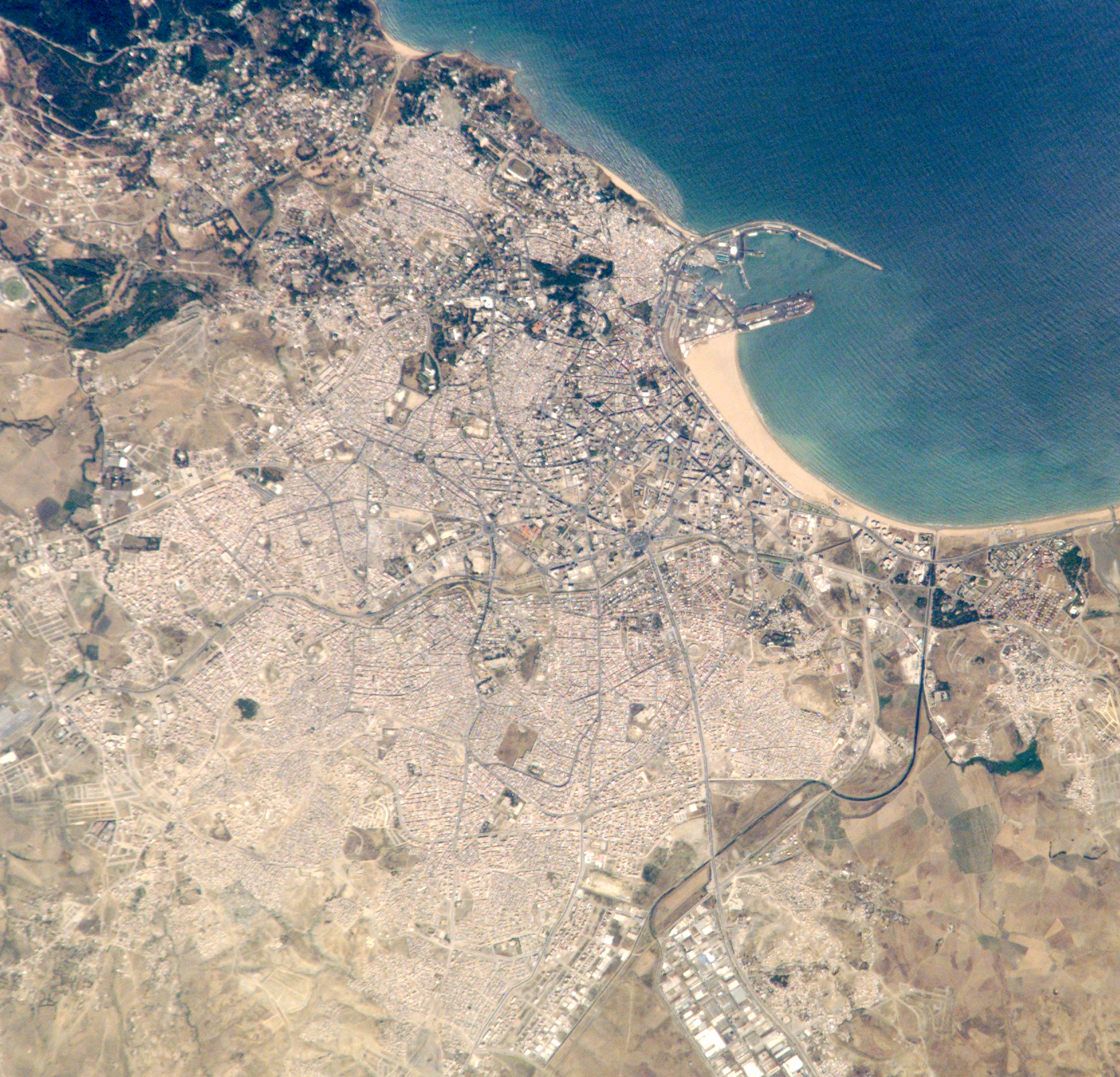
The bay shown in the top right from satellite

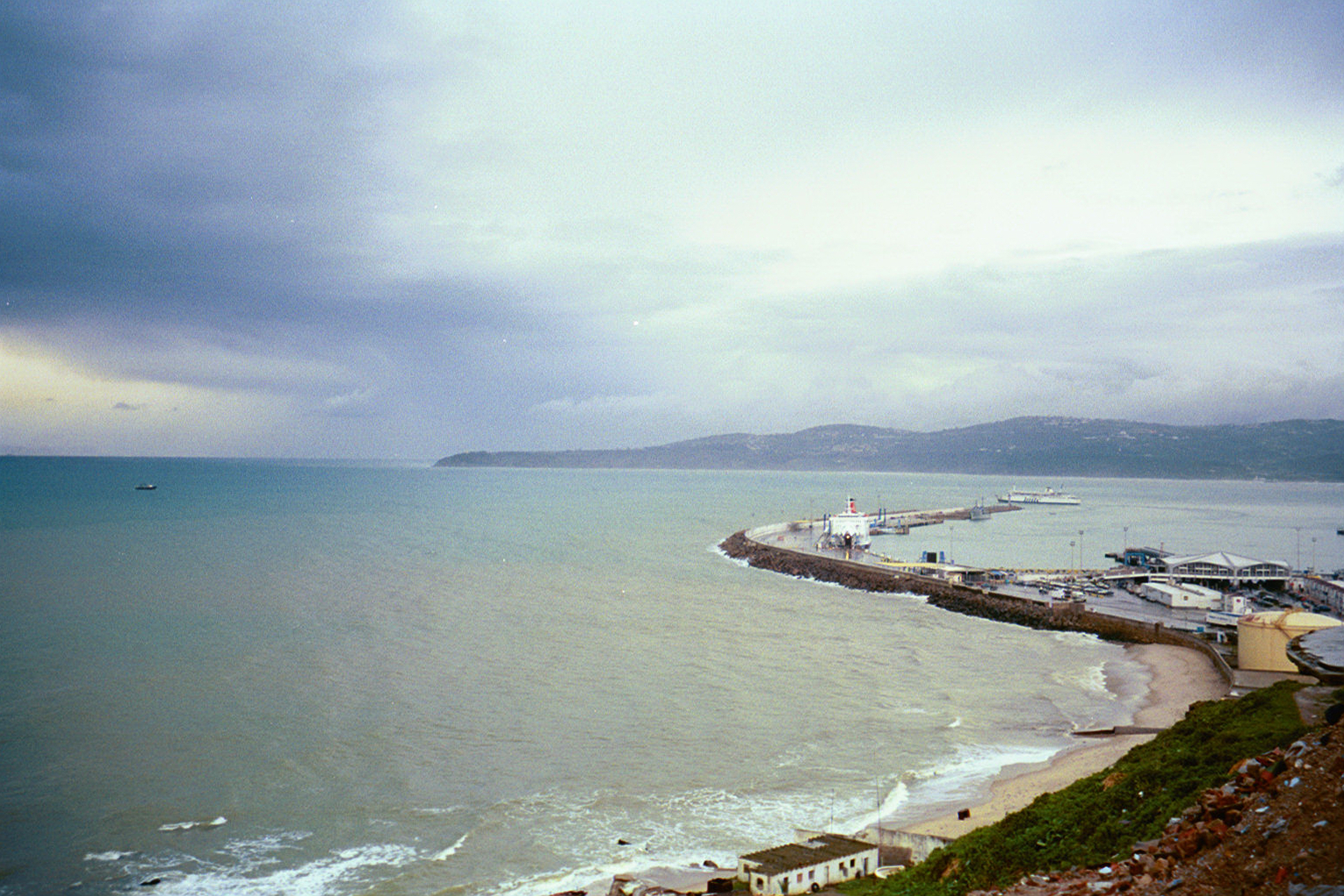
Bay of Tangier from the western end

The Bay of Tangier (Arabic: خليج طنجة) is a bay around Tangier on the Mediterranean in northern Morocco. It forms the body of water between the port and Cap Malabata in a semi circular shape. Avenue d'Espagne runs along the bay and is known for its hotels and large modern establishments.

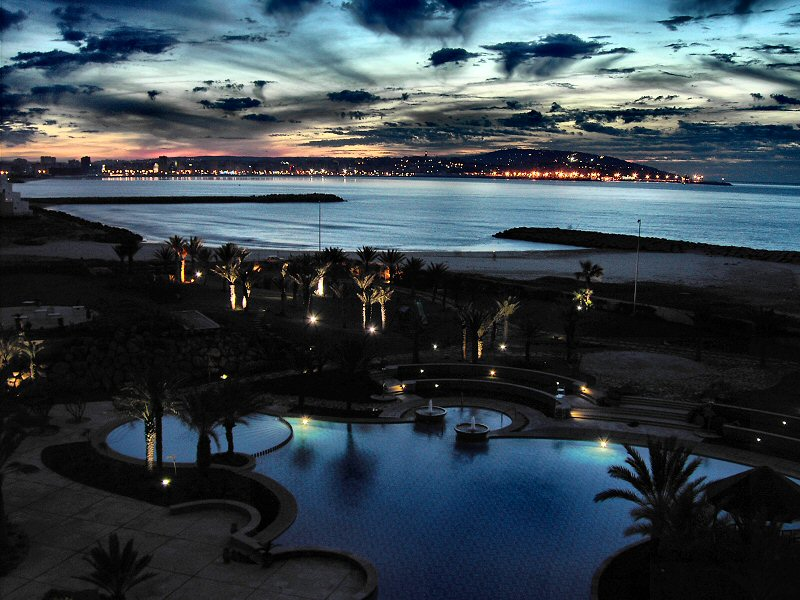
A view of Bay of Tangier at sunset as seen from the Malabata suburb.
