= Lombardi Engineering =

Swiss civil engineering company

Lombardi Engineering Ltd. is a Swiss civil engineering company based in Giubiasco, Bellinzona district. It was established in 1989. It is the successor to "Giovanni Lombardi Ph. D. Consulting Engineers" which was established in 1955 by Giovanni Lombardi. As of 2012, the company employs 200 employees.

== Projects ==
The company is specialized in tunnel ventilation, underground, hydraulic, civil works as well as project studies. It has helped develop projects such St. Gotthard Base Tunnel - Switzerland, AlpTransit, Lyon-Turin Railway, Mont Blanc tunnel and the hypothetical Gibraltar Tunnel linking Africa and Europe through Morocco and Spain.
