= Giovanni Lombardi =

Giovanni Lombardi may refer to:

- Giovanni Lombardi (cyclist), Italian road racing cyclist
- Giovanni Lombardi (engineer), Swiss engineer
- Giovanni Domenico Lombardi, Italian painter
