= Giovanni Lombardi (engineer) =

Swiss engineer (1926–2017)

Giovanni Lombardi (born 28 May 1926 in Sorengo, Switzerland; died 22 May 2017 in Fontvieille, Monaco) was a Swiss engineer specialized in civil works and tunnel construction.

Lombardi was educated at the Institut auf dem Rosenberg and studied civil engineering at university. In late 2006 his company Lombardi Engineering Ltd, a Swiss engineering and design company, was retained to build the Gibraltar Tunnel railway tunnel.
