= Turin–Lyon high-speed railway =

High-speed rail line under construction between Italy and France

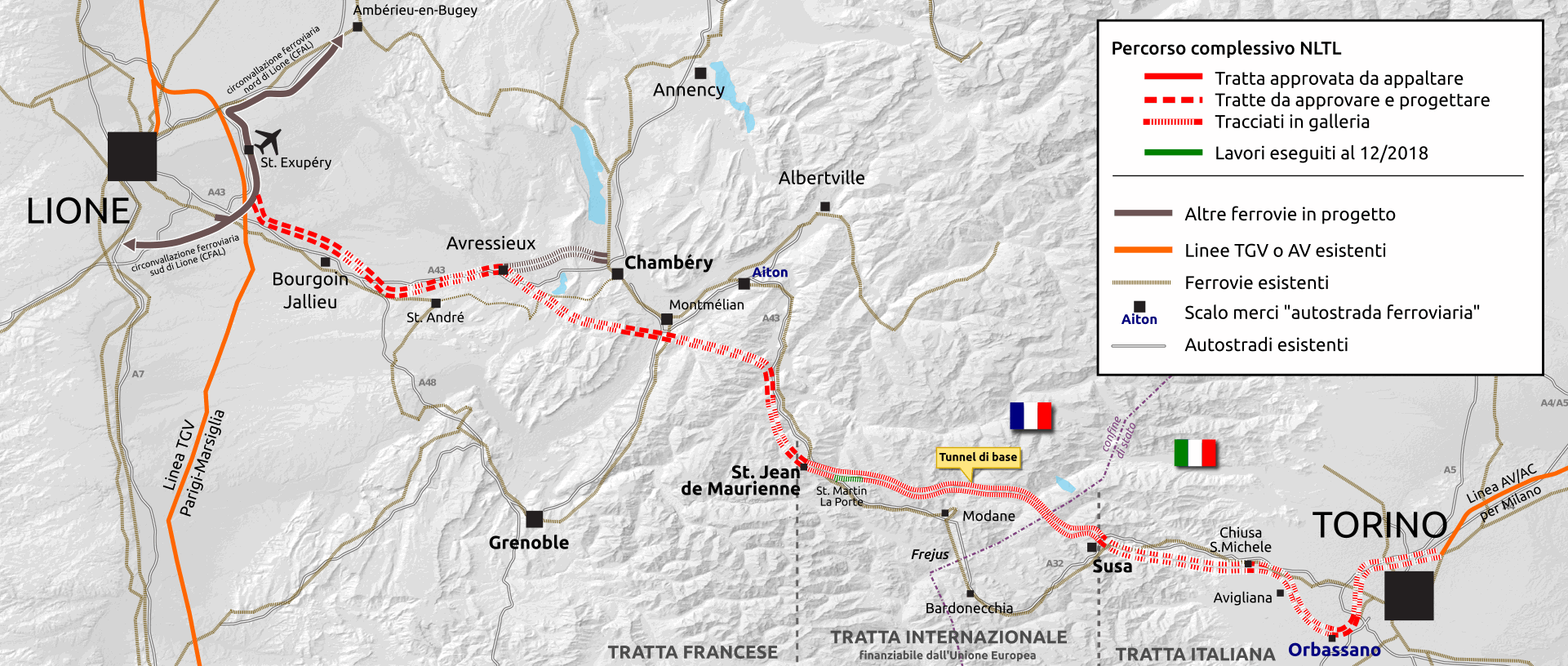
- Status at the end of December 2018

Overview
- Status: Under construction
- Locale: Italy; France

History
- Planned opening: 2033

Technical
- Line length: 271 km (168 mi)
- Number of tracks: Double track
- Track gauge: 1,435 mm (4 ft 8 1/2 in) standard gauge
- Electrification: 25 kV 50 Hz
- Operating speed: 220 km/h (137 mph)
- Signalling: ERTMS Level 2

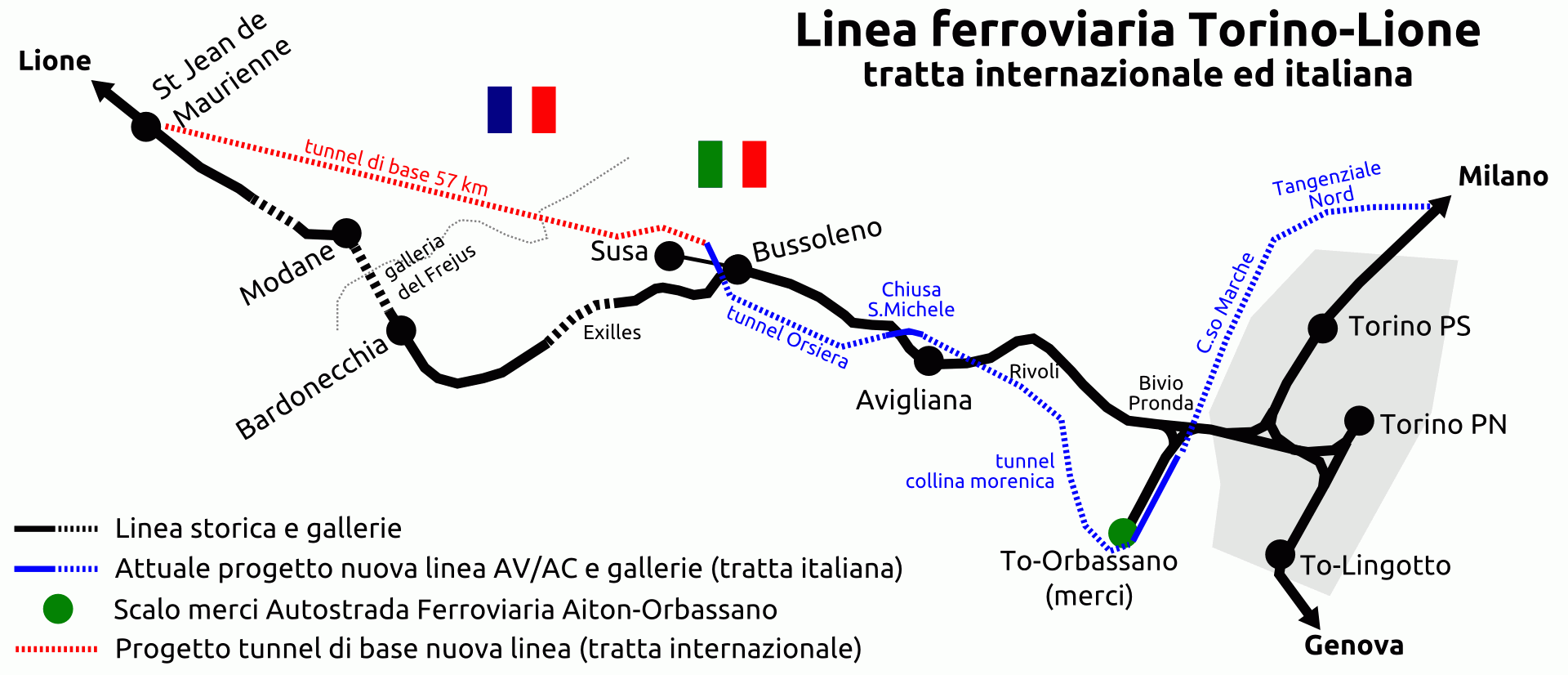
Map of the Italian (blue) and international (red) route of the new line compared to the traditional one (black)

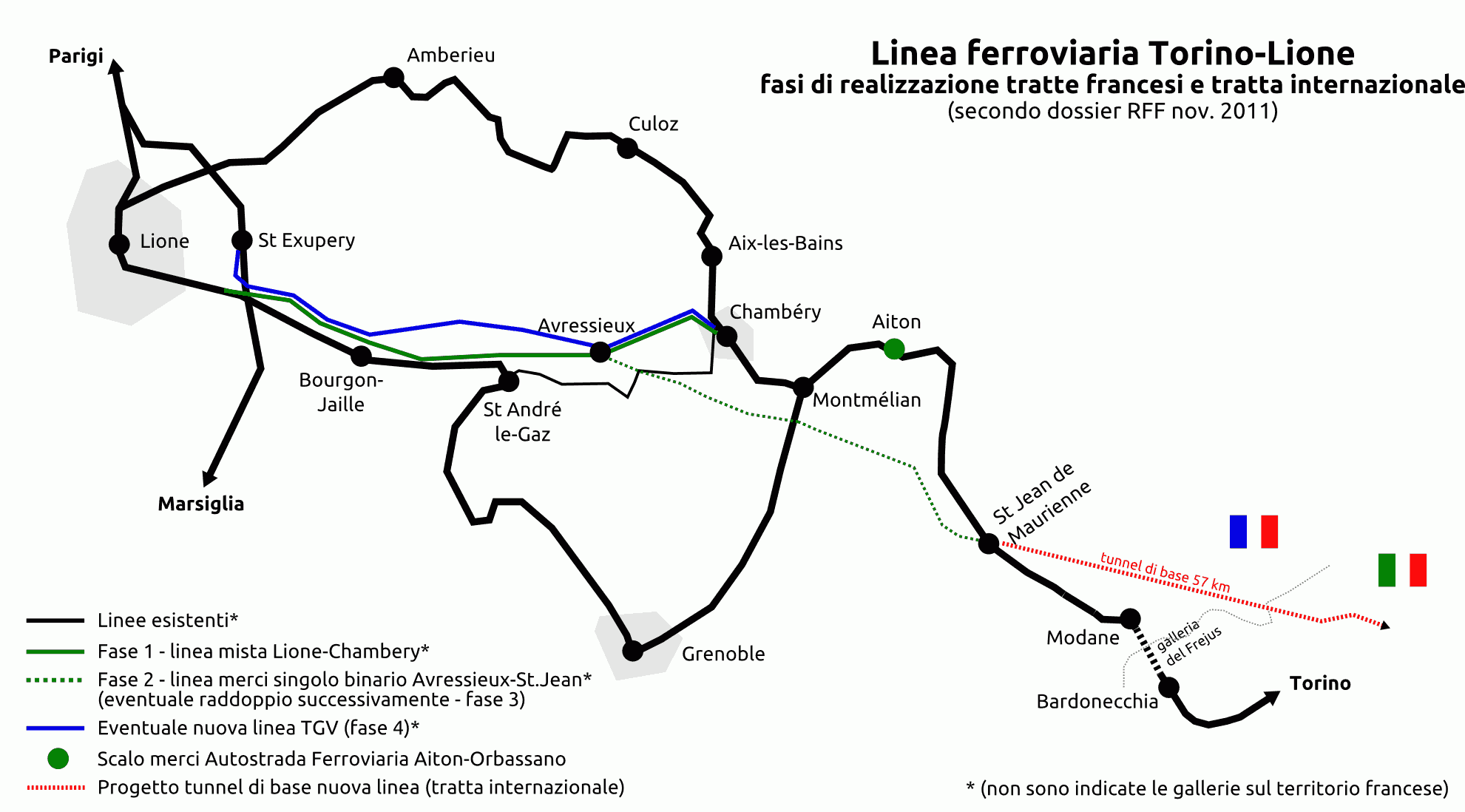
Map of the French (green and blue) and international (red) route of the new line compared to the existing one (black)

The Turin–Lyon high-speed railway is an international rail line under construction between the cities of Turin and Lyon which will link the Italian and French high-speed rail networks. It will be 270 km (170 mi) long, of which over 100 km (62 mi) will be tunnelled. The core of the project is its 70-kilometre-long (43 mi) international section, which will cross the Alps through the Mont d'Ambin Base Tunnel between the Susa Valley in Piedmont and Maurienne in Savoie. The total cost of the line was estimated in 2016 to €25 billion, of which €8 billion was for the international section. The latter was updated to €11 billion in 2024 once most contracts were signed, with some of the cost increase stemming from replacing the initially planned single-tube design by a double-tube design required by new stricter safety regulations.

Like the Swiss NRLA project, the line has twin aims of transferring freight traffic across the Alps from trucks to rail to reduce CO_{2} emissions and local air pollution, and of providing faster passenger transport to reduce air traffic. The new line will considerably shorten the journey times, and its reduced gradients and much wider curves compared to the existing line will also allow heavy freight trains to transit between the two countries at 100 km/h (62 mph) and with much-reduced energy costs. In spite of the name often used by media (and in the title of this page), the line is not high-speed under the definition used by the European Commission: its design speed of 220 km/h (137 mph) is 12% below the 250 km/h (155 mph) threshold used by the commission to define high-speed railways. The European Union funds 40% of the tunnel costs, and has indicated its willingness to increase its contribution to 55%, as well as to help fund its French accesses if those go beyond mere adaptations of the existing infrastructure.

The project has been criticized for its cost, because traffic (both by motorway and by rail) was decreasing when the project was decided, for potential environmental risks during the construction of the tunnel, and because airplanes will still, after including time to and from the airport and through security, be slightly faster over the full Milan–Paris route, although not over shorter segments such as Paris–Turin or Milan–Lyon. A 2012 report by the French Court of Audit questioned the realism of the costs estimates and traffic forecasts. Opposition to the project is mostly organised under the loose banner of the No TAV movement.

The international section is the only part of the line where construction has started. Civil engineering work started in 2002 with the construction of access points and geological reconnaissance tunneling. A 9 km (5.6 mi) gallery tunneled between 2016 and 2019 from Saint-Martin-de-la-Porte towards Italy was presented as reconnaissance work because the project had not yet been formally approved, but it was dug at the position of the south tube of the tunnel and at its final diameter. It effectively represents the first 8% of the final tunnel length. As of mid-2025, the expected completion date for the international section was 2033.

== Pre-construction studies ==
The merits of the new line were the subject of heated debate, primarily in Italy. After violent confrontations between opponents and police during a 2005 attempt to start reconnaissance work near Susa, Piedmont, an Italian governmental commission was set up in 2006 to study all the issues. The work of the commission between 2007 and 2009 was summarized into seven papers (Quaderni). An eighth summary paper focused on cost–benefit analysis was unveiled in June 2012.

=== Present high-altitude line ===
Since 1872, the Turin–Modane railway connects Turin with Lyon via the 13.7-kilometre-long (8.5 mi) high-altitude (maximum tunnel altitude 1,338 metres (4,390 ft)) Fréjus Rail Tunnel. This initially single-track line was doubled and electrified in the early 20th century, and the Italian side of the line was renovated between 1962 and 1984, and again between 2001 and 2011. This historical line has a low maximum allowed height, and its sharp curves force low speeds. Its very poor profile, with a maximum gradient of 3.0%, requires doubling or tripling the locomotives of freight trains. The characteristics of the line vary widely along its length. The Osservatorio divides the international and Italian sides into four sections:

- Modane–Bussoleno (Frejus tunnel and high valley section)
- Bussoleno–Avigliana (low valley section)
- Avigliana–Turin (metropolitan section)
- Turin node (urban section)

The first section comprises the Fréjus tunnel and its approaches on both sides. Its high elevation (1,338 m (4,390 ft)), sharp curves, steep gradients, and low tunnel ceilings make this section the bottleneck on the overall capacity of the line. A 2007 study calculated a maximum capacity of 226 trains/day, 350 days/year, under the safety regulations applicable at the time. The study, using the CAPRES model, foresaw a maximum traffic of 180 freight trains per day, which had to be lowered to about 150 freight trains per day due to logistical inefficiency (the traffic flows between the two countries are asymmetric). A similar analysis for the full year led to a total of about 260 peak days per year. These conditions defined a maximum transport capacity per year of about 20 million tonnes when accounting for inefficiencies, and an absolute limit of about 32 million in "perfect" conditions.

Additional traffic limitations stem from the impact of excessive train transit on the population living near the line. Some 60,000 people live within 250 m (820 ft) of the historical line, and would object to the noise from late-night transits. In 2007, the conventional line was used for only one-third of this calculated total capacity. This low use level was in part because restrictions such as an unusually low maximum allowable train height and the very steep gradients (2.6–3.0%) and sharp curves in its high valley sections discourage its use. A 2018 analysis, however, found the existing line close to saturation, largely because safety regulations now prohibit passenger and freight trains from crossing in a double-track single-tube tunnel. This very significantly reduces the maximum allowed capacity of the 13.7-kilometre-long Fréjus tunnel, which trains of one type must now fully cross before any train of the other type can be allowed in the other direction. The path of the historical line through the deep Maurienne valley is also exposed to rockfalls, and a major landslide in August 2023 forced its closure for a year and a half.

=== Traffic predictions on Frejus and Mont-Blanc corridors ===
Traffic prevision by LTF (red) and BBT (green), compared to real traffic (blue) and a 2007 estimate of the capacity of existing line (pink); the 2007 capacity estimate pre-dates stricter safety regulations on train crossings in tunnels which have significantly reduced this capacity

The following table summarizes 2007 predictions (in million tons per year) of the future freight traffic on both the Frejus and Mont-Blanc corridors, from an analysis of then current data and macroeconomic predictions:

Without the new line	2004	2025	2030	Annual growth 2004–2030
Alps – Total	144.0	264.5	293.4	2.8%
Alps – Rail	48.0	97.7	112.5	3.3%
Modane corridor – Total	28.5	58.1	63.8	3.1%
Modane corridor – Rail	6.5	15.8	16.4	3.6%
With the new line	2004	2025	2030	Annual growth 2004–2030
Alps – Total	144.0	264.5	293.4	2.8%
Alps – Rail	48.0	111.4	130.7	3.9%
Modane corridor – Total	28.5	63.5	76.5	3.9%
Modane corridor – Rail	6.5	29.5	39.4	7.2%
Heavy vehicles (thousand per year)	2004	2025	2030	Annual growth 2004–2030
Without the new line	1,485	2,791	3,121	2.9%
With the new line	1,485	2,244	2,447	1.9%

Promoters of the new line predict that it will about double rail traffic on the Modane corridor compared to the reference scenario. Traffic predictions of even the early traffic of major rail infrastructures are intrinsically uncertain, with well-known examples of overestimates (e.g. the Channel tunnel) and underestimates (e.g. the TGV Est). Some experts disagree with the necessity for a new line connecting France and Italy on the Modane corridor, quoting wide margins for increase in traffic on the old line. Rather than as a natural consequence of faster transit times and a lower price for freight shipping (due to reduced energy use thanks to a much flatter profile, but without necessarily taking into account the full construction cost of the new line), they propose to increase rail traffic by coupling additional renovation of the existing rail infrastructure with sufficiently high financial incentives for rail transport or sufficiently heavy tolls and taxes on road transport. The political realism of such taxes is questionable, as the French government demonstrated in 2013 when it withdrew a much smaller trucking ecotax when faced by extensive riots initiated by the trucking industry as part of the Bonnets Rouges movement. A 2018 study made this specific controversy much less relevant by finding that the existing line actually is close to saturation. This is primarily because updated safety regulations on train crossings in single-tube tunnels have significantly reduced its maximum allowed capacity. The brand-new line will also meet higher safety standards, and it will make the older infrastructure fully available for regional and suburban services, which is an important consideration near the congested Turin node.

== New railway line ==
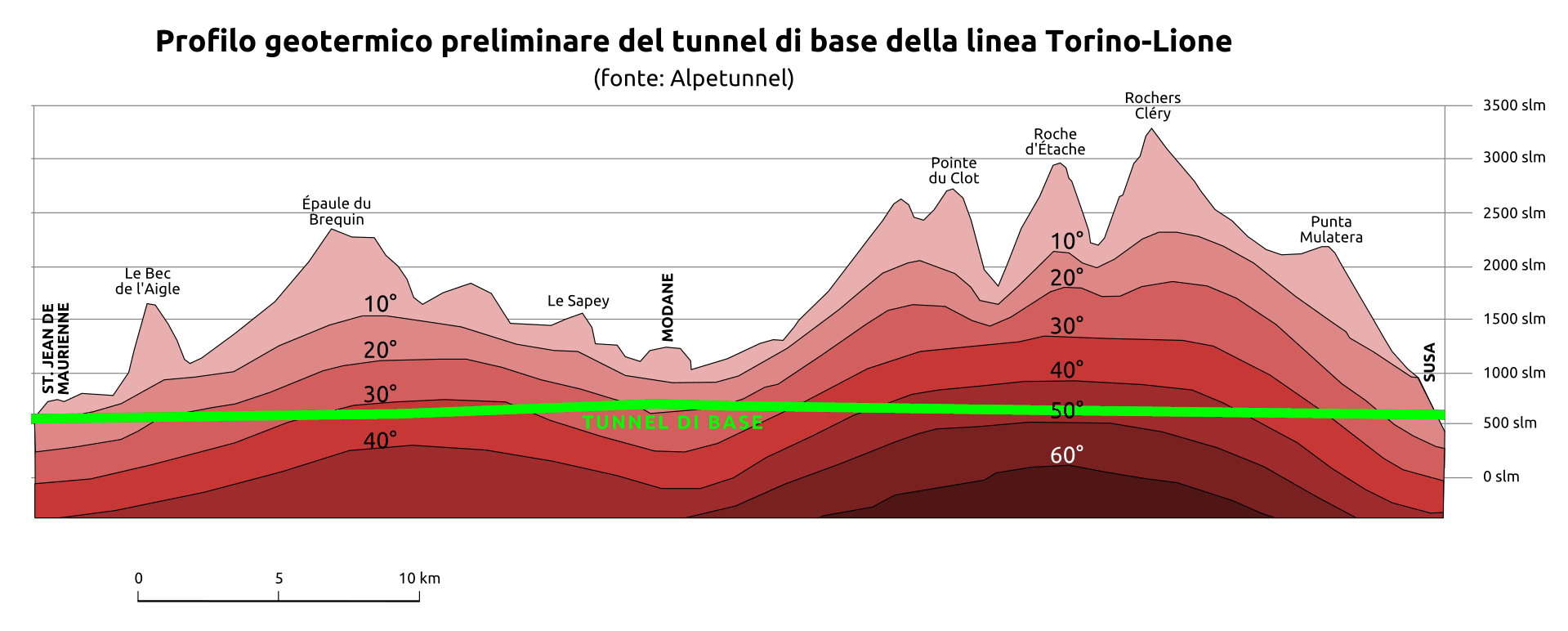
Geothermal profile of the Turin-Lyon railway base tunnel

The new railway line will have a maximum gradient of 1.25%, compared to 3.0% for the old line, a maximum altitude of 580 m (1,900 ft) instead of 1,338 m (4,390 ft), and much wider curves. This will allow heavy freight trains to transit at 100 km/h (62 mph) and passenger trains at a top speed of 220 km/h (137 mph), while also sharply reducing the energy used. The construction of the full higher-speed line will cut passenger travel time from Milan to Paris from seven hours to four, becoming time-competitive with plane travel for city-centre to city-centre travel. The line is divided into three sections constructed under separate managements:

- the international section between Saint-Jean-de-Maurienne in Savoie and Bussoleno includes the Mont d'Ambin Base Tunnel. Its ongoing construction is managed by Tunnel Euralpin Lyon Turin (TELT SAS), a joint venture of Rete Ferroviaria Italiana (RFI) and SNCF that replaced Lyon Turin Ferroviaire;
- the French section between Saint-Jean-de-Maurienne and the outskirts of Lyon will be built under SNCF Réseau management;
- the Italian section between Bussoleno (Susa valley) and Turin is under RFI.

Due to the asymmetry of the Alps, which peak much closer to the Northern Italy plain than to flat terrain in France, the 140 km French section is three times longer than its 46.7 km Italian counterpart.

=== French section ===
The French section of the new line is planned with eventually separate paths for passengers and freight between Lyon and the Maurienne valley. The passenger line will link the LGV Sud-Est (through a connection South of Gare de Lyon Saint-Exupéry) and the central Lyon stations to both Italy and Chambéry. It will connect near Chambéry to the Annecy via Aix les Bains and the Bourg Saint-Maurice via Albertville lines. The time gain from Paris or Lyon to Aix-les-Bains or Chambéry will be almost 45 minutes, and almost an hour to Annecy. The line may also be used to offload the saturated Lyon–Grenoble line from its TGV traffic. This would remove traffic at mismatched speeds, and therefore would free many more train paths for much needed additional local trains than the number of TGVs shifted to the new line.

The freight line will start from a connection to the future Lyon rail freight bypass, follow the A43 Motorway, and will pass South of Chambéry through a tunnel under the Chartreuse Mountains. The line will then reach Saint-Jean-de-Maurienne through a second 20-to-23-kilometre (12 to 14 mi) tunnel under the Belledonne mountains. The new freight line will divert the freight traffic away from Aix-les-Bains and Chambéry, and from the shores of the Lac du Bourget where a freight accident on the existing lakeside line could catastrophically pollute this major natural freshwater reservoir. In January 2024, before an EU deadline for funding, the French national government and various local entities came to a last-minute agreement on their respective funding contributions to the studies of the French section. In December 2024, the French government selected for detailed studies the fastest and highest-capacity option, which also is the most expensive. It features a mixed-use double-track line from Grenay near Lyon to Avressieux near Chambery in Savoie and a single-track freight line from Avressieux to Saint Jean de Maurienne.

=== Italian section ===
The Italian government adopted the path of the Italian section in August 2011, after extensive 2006–2011 consultations headed by Government Commissary Mario Virano within the Italian Technical Observatory. In the Susa valley, this path sidesteps through additional tunneling the strong opposition to a previous planned path on the left bank of the Dora Riparia, which would have used a viaduct in Venaus and a tunnel in Bussoleno.

=== International section ===
The international section of the Lyon–Turin line spans about 70 km (43 mi) between Saint-Jean-de-Maurienne in Savoie and Bussoleno in Piemonte, and it is the only part of the line on which major construction has started. The 57.5 km (35.7 mi) Mont d'Ambin base tunnel is being dug under the Mont d'Ambin and is the major engineering work of the overall future Turin–Lyon line. An underground service and rescue train station is planned around the half-way point of the tunnel, east of Modane.

== Construction progress ==
Civil engineering work started in 2002 with the construction of access points and geological reconnaissance tunneling. Construction of the tunnel itself was at that time planned to start in 2014–2015, but the project was only approved in 2015 for a cost of €25 billion, of which €8 billion was for the base tunnel. The ratification of the corresponding international treaty by the parliaments of the two countries concluded with a 26 January 2017 vote of the French Senate. Starting in 2016, and therefore before the ratification of the treaty, a 9-kilometre (5.6 mi) gallery was tunneled from Saint-Martin-de-la-Porte towards Italy. While presented as a reconnaissance gallery because the project had yet to be fully approved, it was dug along the axis of the South tube of the tunnel and at its final diameter. In late 2016, that tunnel encountered a geologically difficult zone of fractured and water-soaked coal-bearing schists, and for several months made only very slow progress through it. Tunneling eventually passed this zone in Spring 2017 after injecting 30 tons of reinforcing resin, and resumed at nominal speed. That gallery makes up the first 9 km (5.6 mi) of the South tube of the tunnel, and it was completed in September 2019, in time and within budget.

The contracting for the bulk of the tunnel construction was then delayed by deep disagreements on the merits of the Turin–Lyon project within the Italian coalition government between the Five Star Movement and Lega parties, and in March 2019, Italy's Prime Minister Giuseppe Conte officially asked TELT to stop the launch of tenders for further construction work. A few months later, and just before further delays would have threatened the EU funding of the project, the Italian government eventually agreed to the publication of calls for tender for the main tunneling work on the French and Italian sides. €2.8 billion of construction contracts had been signed as of June 2020, and contracts worth a further €3 billion for the excavation of the 80% of the tunnel located on the French side of the border were signed in September 2021. Those contracts are:

- Work Package 1 (€1.47 bn) for 22 km (13.7 mi) between Villarodin-Bourget/Modane and the Italian border is expected to take 72 months for two tunnel boring machines.
- Work Package 2 (€1.43 bn) for 23 km (14.3 mi) between Saint-Martin-de-la-Porte/La Praz and Villarodin-Bourget/Modane is expected to take 65 months for three tunnel boring machines (10 kilometers of the South tube were dug between 2016 and 2019).
- Work Package 3 (€228 mn) for 3 km (1.9 mi) between the Western (French) Portal at Saint-Julien-Mont-Denis and Saint-Martin-de-la-Porte; this lot is the shortest by far, but test drilling had identified fractured and sheared coal-bearing schists that are poorly suited for a tunnel boring machine; it instead is being bored by a combination of jackhammering for the weakest rock near the portal and drilling and blasting further in, and is expected to take 70 months.

Work on the 3-kilometre (1.9 mi) Work Package 3 section started from the French portal in December 2022, and by April 2025 had advanced by 1.7 km on each tube. The setting of its final lining started in August 2025. Work at the other French work sites prepared for the installation of the five tunnel boring machines, which were built by Herrenknecht, a German company based in Schwanau, Baden-Württemberg, which is the sole European TBM builder. They were delivered to the Work Package 2 and 1 consortia between July 2023 and February 2024 for in-factory tests, and started arriving in the Maurienne valley in July 2024 for their on-site reassembly. The Italian and French transport ministers ceremonially launched the first of the five in Saint-Martin-de-la-Porte in April 2025, and it started tunneling towards Modane in September 2025. As of summer 2026, it is progressing slowly through the localized difficult geology that the 2016-2019 tunneling of the South tube previously encountered.

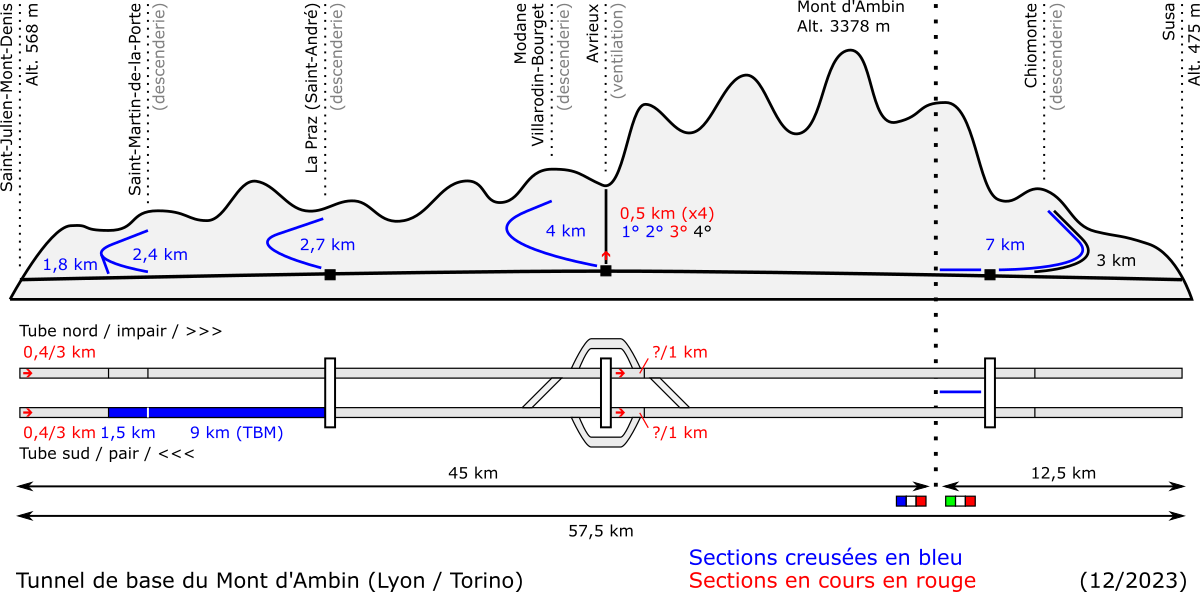
Profile of Mont d'Ambin Base Tunnel (excavated sections as of 2023 in blue, sections in progress in red)

TELT awarded the contract for the excavation of the 25 km (16 mi) of tunneling on Italian territory in August 2023 and published in June 2023 a call for tender for the outfitting of the tunnel and its maintenance for the first 7 years of its operations. As of April 2026, 20.5 of the 115 km (two tubes of 57.5 km each) of the main tunnels had been dug, as well as 27.1 km of auxiliary galleries (access tunnels, ventilation wells, etc.). As of mid-2025, the expected completion date for the international section was 2033.

== Environmental impact ==
The project's promoters estimate that it will achieve net-negative carbon emissions after 25 years; however, this calculation is highly dependent on traffic projections that have been widely criticized. Some independent research shows results up to ten times lower than those claimed by the promoters.

The project could affect the water supply network, with sixteen potable-water pumping sites that may be impacted by the construction works. Tunneling works are well known for their ability to drain underground water and degrade water sources. A decrease in both the quality and quantity of water could be linked to the construction activities. In 2000, and therefore well before the 2002 start of the exploratory tunneling, a nearby village lost its entire water supply following an excavation incident.

As a result, residents had to be supplied with potable water delivered by tanker trucks until the source was restored.

In the Maurienne region, a significant drop in the mountain water table has been observed, leading to soil subsidence. This might have affected a dam structure. Although causality has not yet been formally established, similar historical cases have been documented, such as the Tseuzier Dam in Switzerland. The project's promoters and the prefecture assure that there will be no impacts on water resources. A call for tenders issued by TELT for the water supply of the Maurienne raises questions among local residents. In addition, exemptions from water-protection regulations were granted by the prefect for the construction works.

== Opposition to the project ==
Ever since plans for the railway line were first mentioned in the 1990s, some residents of most of the 112 towns and villages along its path have been set strongly against it. No TAV is an Italian movement against the construction of the line, named from the Italian acronym for Treno Alta Velocità (High Speed Train), a high-speed rail company. French opposition to the railway also exists but has been less visible. A 2019 poll in both countries, commissioned by TELT but conducted by respected polling companies, found that opposition to the railway link increases as one approaches the location of the tunnel, but that it was nonetheless a minority view even in the Susa and Maurienne valleys.

=== Local French views ===
In Chimilin, a French town of 1,100 which will be split by the railway, the town council has opposed the plans since 1992, and the 2014–2020 mayor Marie Chabert saw the economic uncertainty as damaging for the region. In Villarodin-Bourget, a small French village, residents represented by the Association pour la Sauvegarde du Site du Moulin have opposed the digging of a 4-kilometre (2.5 mi) survey tunnel since 2002 and are in close communication with the No TAV movement. The mayor Gilles Margueron said that "after we started looking at the project in details, we soon arrived at a position of complete opposition."

=== No TAV movement in Italy ===
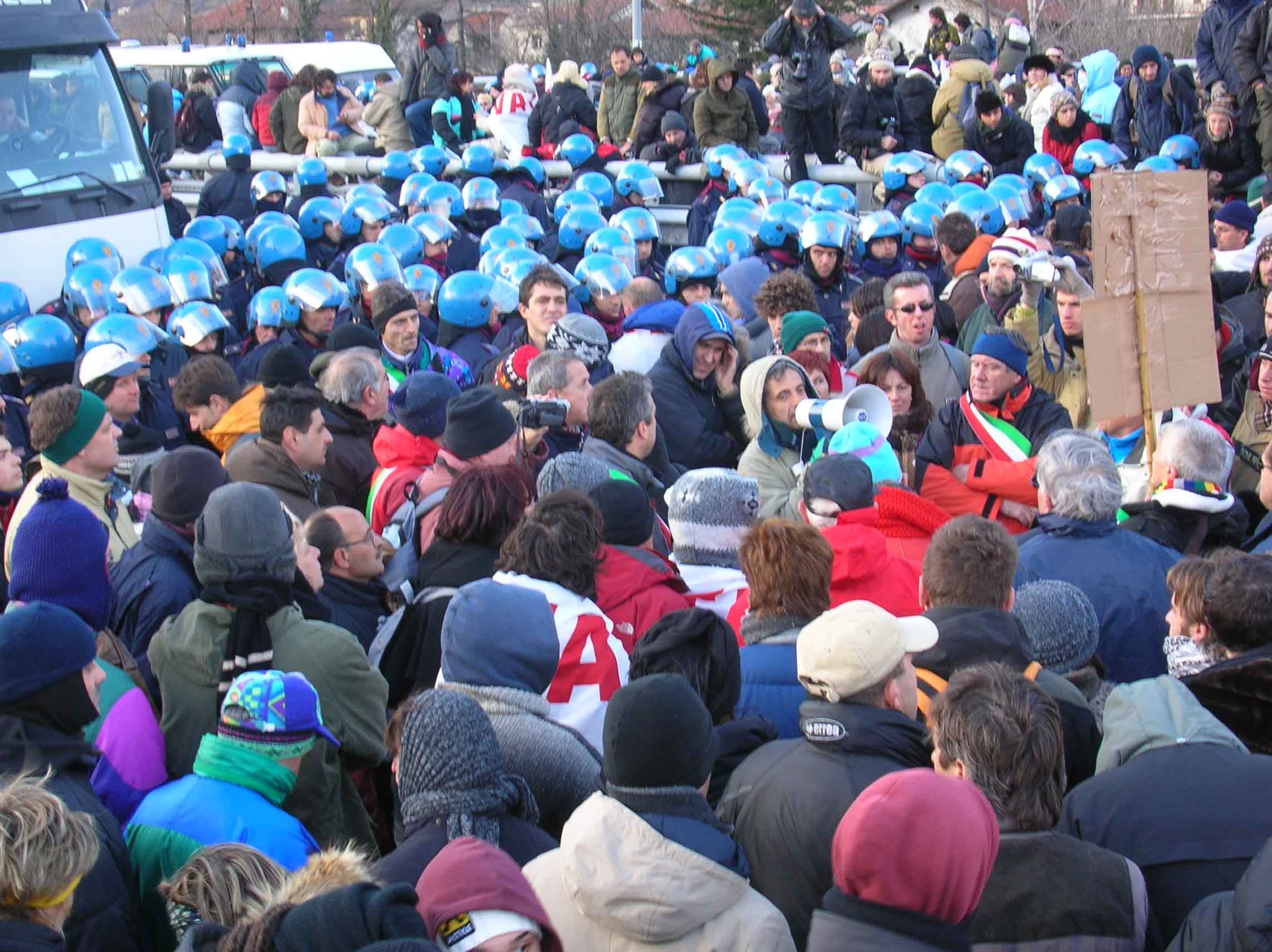
No TAV protests in 2005

Some people in the Susa Valley in Italy have been resisting the railway project since the 1990s. The No TAV movement began in 1990, with actions to inform local people affected by the plans, supported by the mayors of the valley and the Comunità Montana (Mountainous Community). From 2000 onwards, there were demonstrations, squatted centres, a trade union solidarity project, and a social forum. The resistance was spoken about in terms of the partisan resistance to the Nazis in World War II.

The movement advocates the tactics of non-violent direct action, but some protests have turned violent. For example in the 2026 Susa Valley conflict, with attacks against construction sites and law enforcement. Catholics pray at the Chiomonte construction site, while other networks organise communal dinners, discussions, and flash mobs. In Venaus, a land squat called the Presidio is situated next to where the survey tunnel was originally planned to be dug.

=== Arguments ===
The No TAV movement generally questions the worthiness, cost, and safety of the project, drawing arguments from studies, experts, and governmental documents from Italy, France, and Switzerland. It deems the new line useless and too expensive, and decries its realization as driven by construction lobbies. Its main stated objections are:

- Better to update existing infrastructure.
- Low level of saturation on the Frejus rail tunnel and stable or decreasing traffic also on Fréjus Road Tunnel. A more recent study found the existing rail line close to saturation because stricter safety standards on train crossings in single-tube tunnels have sharply reduced its capacity.
- Economical feasibility in doubt due to high costs.
- Danger of environmental disasters.
- Health concerns due to the hypothesized presence of uranium and asbestos in and around the mountains where the tunnel is bored, although the extensive reconnaissance tunneling has found none to date. Supporters of the tunnel argue that the risk of contamination is overstated or non-existent.

Members of the protest movement have summarized their ideas against the construction of the new line in a document containing 150 reasons against it, and in a wide number of specific documents and meetings. Critics of the No TAV movement characterize it as a typical NIMBY (Not In My Back Yard) movement and observe the pollution reduction and CO_{2} emission elimination benefits of the tunnel. In response, No TAV activists talk about LULU (locally unwanted land use).

== See also ==
- High-speed rail in Europe
- List of longest tunnels
- List of tunnels by location
- Mediterranean Corridor
- Réseau Ferré de France
- TGV

== Bibliography ==
- Quaderno 1: Linea storica – Tratta di valico [Book 1: Old line – upper section]. Osservatorio Ministeriale per il collegamento ferroviario Torino-Lione, Rome, May 2007
- Quaderno 2: Scenari di traffico – Arco Alpino [Book 2: Traffic scenarios – Alps passes]. Osservatorio Ministeriale per il collegamento ferroviario Torino-Lione, Rome, June 2007
- Quaderno 3: Linea storica – Tratta di valle [Book 3: Old line – lower section]. Osservatorio Ministeriale per il collegamento ferroviario Torino-Lione, Rome, December 2007
