= Torre del Fraile =

Friar Tower
- Torre del Fraile (Spanish)
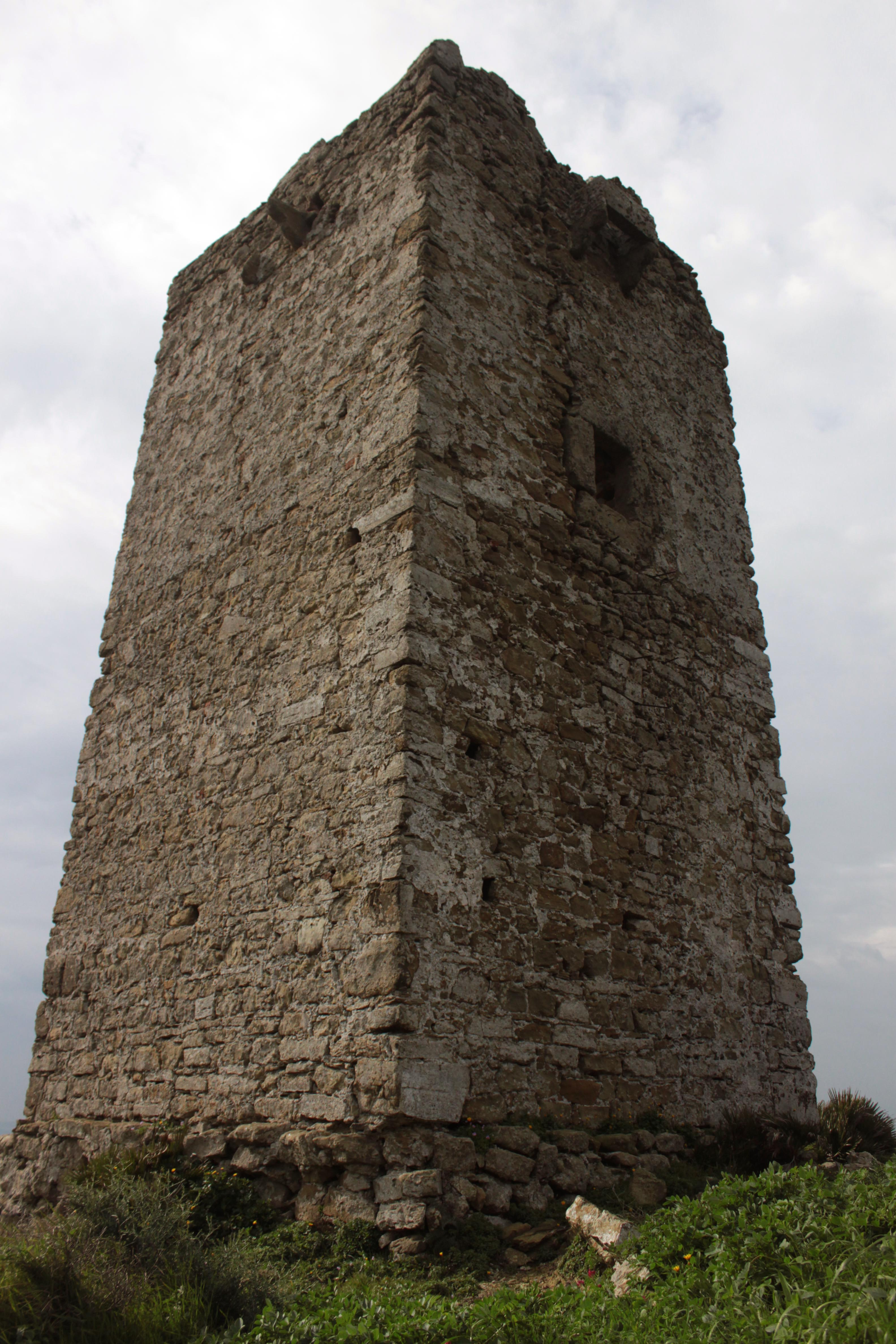
- the remains of the Torre del Fraile

- Location within Province of Cádiz Location within Spain
- 36.05746°N 5.45265°W
- Location: Algeciras, Spain

History
- Built: 1588

Site notes
- Architect(s): Luis Bravo de Acuña and Juan Pedro Laguna

Spanish Cultural Heritage
- Official name: Torre del Fraile
- Type: Non-movable
- Criteria: Monument

The Torre del Fraile (Tower Canutos or Friar Tower) is one of a set of military watchtowers built around the South and East coast of Spain to keep an eye on passing shipping and Barbary pirates. The watchtowers were in sight of one another and it was therefore possible to get a signal to Gibraltar from the watchtower in Tarifa. The tower was designed by Luis Bravo and Juan Pedro Laguna in 1588.

The tower is about 240 metres back from the sea and Cala Arenas and 120 metres above it. The tower is over six metres in diameter and was over thirteen metres high until the top collapsed in 2006 with the loss of a window and the upper staircase. The tower's entrance was over five metres in the air and this led onto a floor. From this the soldiers could climb to the top where space was reserved for firewood for signalling.
