= 2026 Susa Valley conflict =

Civil unrest in Italy (2026)

- Part of No TAV movement protests
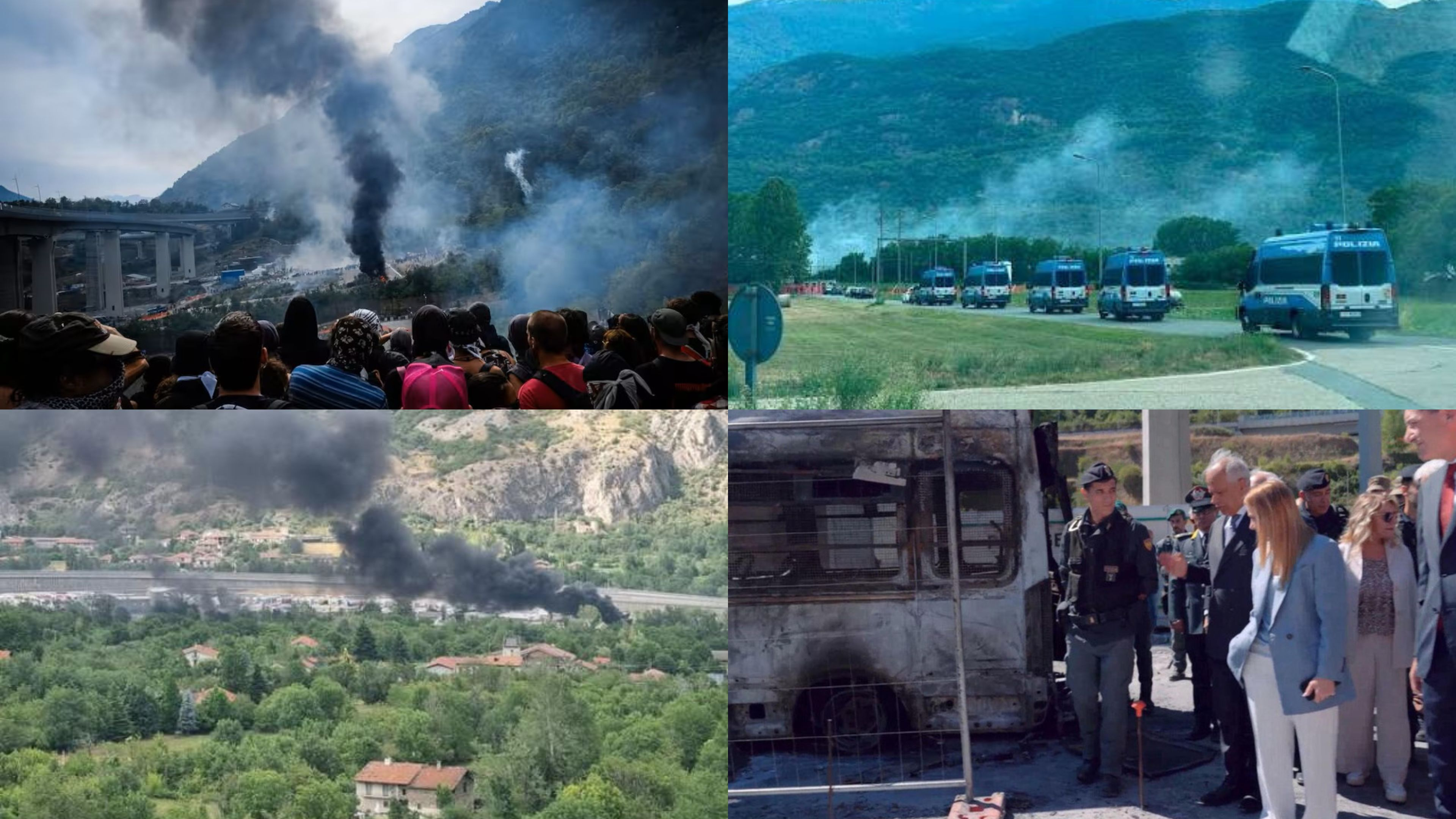
- Clockwise from top-left: Attack on the TAV construction site in Chiomonte (July 25, 2026); State Police vans heading toward Chiomonte (July 25, 2026); attack on the San Didero truck terminal (July 25, 2026); Italian Prime Minister Giorgia Meloni and Interior Minister Matteo Piantedosi visit the affected areas, comparing the location to a “war zone” (July 27, 2026)
- Date: 25 July 2026 – 2 August 2026 (1 week and 1 day)
- Location: Italy, Susa Valley
- Caused by: Opposition to the construction of high-capacity and high-speed rail infrastructure
- Methods: Protest, guerrilla warfare
- Result: Four construction sites destroyed or gravely damaged; Approximately €1 million in property damage (estimate expected to rise); Eviction order issued for the No TAV camp at Venaus; Temporary reintroduction of internal Schengen border controls at the France–Italy border; Increased militarization of the Susa Valley

Parties
Italian government; Armed Forces; Carabinieri; State Police; Financial Guard; Support by: FDI; LSP; FI; Az; USIP; USIC	NO TAV movement; Black Bloc militants; Autonomia Contropotere; Support by: PaP; PRC; French protesters Belgian protesters

Lead figures
Giorgia Meloni; Guido Crosetto; Salvatore Luongo; Vittorio Pisani; Andrea De Gennaro; Matteo Piantedosi	Franco Olivero Fugera; Nicoletta Dosio; Andrea Bonadonna; Giorgio Rossetto

Units involved
	~20.000 NO TAV protesters ~3000 Black Bloc militants

Casualties and losses
About 130 injured (as of July 30, 2026)	About 30 injured (as of July 30, 2026)

The 2026 Susa Valley conflict was a period of unrest in the Susa Valley, Piedmont, Italy, centred on the construction of the Turin–Lyon high-speed railway (TAV). The disorders started on 25 July 2026, when No TAV protesters carried out coordinated attacks against four construction sites and Italian law enforcement near Chiomonte and San Didero, resulting in violent clashes.

== Background ==
The No TAV movement is an Italian protest movement that emerged in the early 1990s in the Susa Valley, Piedmont, in opposition to the construction of the Turin–Lyon high-speed railway (TAV). Initially formed by local residents, environmental organisations, technical experts and local administrators, the movement argues that the project is environmentally harmful, economically unjustified and unnecessary. Over time, it expanded beyond the Susa Valley, becoming one of Italy's longest-running and most prominent protest movements, attracting support from activists, trade unions, political groups and solidarity networks from across Italy and abroad. The movement has organised demonstrations, marches, permanent protest camps, public information campaigns and acts of civil disobedience.

Several episodes have marked periods of heightened tension between protesters and the Italian authorities. In 2005, police cleared the permanent protest camp at Venaus, triggering mass demonstrations that forced the suspension of the construction site and led to the establishment of a government technical observatory. In 2011, authorities dismantled the Maddalena camp in Chiomonte to allow the opening of the exploratory tunnel construction site, followed days later by one of the largest No TAV demonstrations, during which violent clashes left hundreds of protesters and law enforcement officers injured. Further confrontations occurred throughout 2012, as demonstrations against the construction works repeatedly escalated into clashes with police, arrests and criminal investigations. New tensions emerged following the opening of the San Didero construction site in 2021, where protesters attempted to obstruct construction activities through repeated demonstrations and direct actions.

== Timeline ==
=== 25 July ===
On 25 July 2026, the annual No TAV demonstration took place in the Susa Valley during the tenth edition of the Alta Felicità Festival. According to the organizers, approximately 20,000 people participated in the march, which departed from Venaus under the slogan "march to the construction sites of devastation". Prior to the demonstration, the Prefecture of Turin had introduced extraordinary public security measures, including restrictions on access to the area and preventive seizures of slingshots, fireworks, rockets, marbles and other objects considered capable of being used during violent confrontations. Authorities had also issued several exclusion orders against individuals considered a potential threat to public order.

During the afternoon, while the main demonstration continued along its planned route, several groups of masked and black-clad protesters separated from the march and moved toward the Turin–Lyon railway construction sites. According to investigators and subsequent media reconstructions, the attacks were coordinated, with demonstrators simultaneously targeting four construction sites located near Chiomonte, San Didero, Due Rivi and Salbertrand in an apparent attempt to divide law enforcement resources. The largest groups headed toward the construction sites at Chiomonte and San Didero, while smaller groups targeted the remaining sites.

The first major clashes occurred at San Didero, where protesters threw stones, firecrackers, rockets and smoke devices at police cordons protecting the construction area. Riot police responded with repeated volleys of tear gas, temporarily preventing demonstrators from entering the site. The confrontation continued for approximately twenty minutes before many of the protesters withdrew and regrouped with other militant groups moving toward Chiomonte.

The most intense violence occurred at the Chiomonte construction site. According to media reports, approximately 2,000 protesters reached the area through mountain paths leading to the Val Clarea site. Equipped with gas masks, helmets, shields, angle grinders and bolt cutters, groups of protesters breached sections of the perimeter fencing before entering parts of the construction area. During the assault, protesters threw stones, fireworks, Molotov cocktails, improvised incendiary devices, rockets and other projectiles at members of the Italian State Police, Carabinieri and Guardia di Finanza deployed to defend the site. Several construction offices were set on fire, while at least two law enforcement vehicles were destroyed by fire.

Law enforcement responded by deploying large quantities of tear gas, supported by water cannons, in an effort to disperse the attackers and regain control of the construction site. Clashes continued for more than an hour, extending into nearby wooded areas as protesters retreated through mountain trails while police gradually re-established control of the perimeter. Authorities later described the attacks as one of the most organised assaults against the Turin–Lyon railway project in recent years.

By the evening, the clashes had spread across multiple locations in the Susa Valley. Construction equipment, temporary buildings and security infrastructure sustained extensive damage, while TELT later reported significant destruction within the affected construction sites. No construction workers were reported injured during the attacks. Initial official reports recorded around 50 injured law enforcement officers, although this figure was subsequently revised upward as additional personnel sought medical treatment in the following days.

The violence prompted immediate reactions from Italian political leaders. President Sergio Mattarella contacted Interior Minister Matteo Piantedosi to express solidarity with the injured officers, while Prime Minister Giorgia Meloni condemned the attacks, stating that "violence will not bend the State". Interior Minister Piantedosi described the events as evidence of an attempt by extremist groups to escalate the conflict surrounding the Turin–Lyon railway project. Criminal investigations were opened shortly after the clashes to identify those responsible for the attacks and the extensive damage to the construction sites.

=== 26 July ===
On 26 July 2026, the Turin Public Prosecutor's Office opened a large-scale criminal investigation into the coordinated attacks carried out the previous day against the Turin–Lyon railway construction sites. Investigators examined surveillance footage, drone recordings and body-camera videos, while forensic teams collected evidence from the affected sites. Authorities stated that both criminal and administrative proceedings would be pursued against those identified.

By the end of the day, investigators had identified approximately 450 participants believed to have taken part in the attacks, including several foreign nationals. During searches, police seized Molotov cocktails, improvised incendiary devices, fireworks, gas masks, helmets and balaclavas, which were added to the investigation.

Authorities updated the casualty figures, reporting 126 injured law enforcement officers, including 58 Italian State Police officers, 48 Carabinieri and 20 Guardia di Finanza officers. Around 30 protesters were also reported injured, while no construction workers were harmed during the attacks.

TELT estimated the damage to the Chiomonte construction site at approximately €1 million, with additional damage reported at the sites in San Didero, Salbertrand and Traduerivi. Construction activities remained suspended while investigators documented the damage and secured the affected areas.

The No TAV movement described the demonstration as "a great day of struggle" and announced that the mobilisation would continue in the coming days. Government officials, including Prime Minister Giorgia Meloni and Interior Minister Matteo Piantedosi, condemned the attacks and reaffirmed their support for the completion of the Turin–Lyon high-speed railway. Security around the construction sites remained reinforced as investigations continued.

=== 27 July ===
On 27 July 2026, Prime Minister Giorgia Meloni and Interior Minister Matteo Piantedosi visited the Turin–Lyon railway construction site at Chiomonte, where they met members of the Italian law enforcement agencies deployed in the Susa Valley and workers employed by TELT. Before arriving at the site, the two officials carried out an aerial inspection of the affected area by helicopter.

During the visit, Meloni described the previous day's attacks as "organized and premeditated violence" rather than legitimate dissent, stating that the government would do everything possible to bring those responsible to justice. She also expressed solidarity with the more than 120 injured law enforcement officers and reaffirmed the government's commitment to completing the Turin–Lyon high-speed railway.

The Turin Public Prosecutor's Office continued its investigation into the attacks under the alleged offence of devastation. Police announced that more than 800 people had been identified as they left the Alta Felicità Festival, in addition to the hundreds identified the previous day. Investigators also stopped four foreign activists, believed to be linked to Black Bloc groups, while their legal positions remained under examination.

Security measures across the Susa Valley were further strengthened, with additional checkpoints established on roads leading to Venaus and the surrounding area. Around 1,000 people remained at the festival campsite while police maintained an extensive security presence and continued collecting evidence from the attacks.

During the visit, TELT officials stated that the attacks represented the most severe assault on the company's construction sites since 2011. The company also confirmed that the initial estimate of damage, previously placed at around €1 million, was expected to increase as further inspections continued.

=== 28 July ===
On 28 July 2026, investigations into the attacks continued as police analysed surveillance footage, forensic evidence and material seized during and after the clashes. Authorities announced that additional suspects had been identified, while security remained reinforced around the construction sites at Chiomonte and San Didero. The No TAV movement also announced a new four-day mobilisation in the Susa Valley, scheduled to begin on 30 July.

=== 29 July ===
On 29 July 2026, the Prefecture of Turin announced extraordinary public security measures ahead of the planned No TAV mobilisation. Restrictions included a temporary ban on free camping in parts of the Susa Valley, increased police checkpoints and limitations on the possession of items considered capable of being used during violent confrontations. The No TAV movement criticised the measures and confirmed that the demonstrations would proceed as planned.

=== 30 - 31 July ===
The two days were relatively peaceful, despite the tightening of security measures and the increased police presence in the Susa Valley following the previous clashes. No major incidents were reported, while both authorities and No TAV activists continued their respective positions regarding the railway project and the restrictions imposed on the area.

=== 1 August ===
==== The Venaus Declaration ====
On 1 August, No Tav militants issued a communiqué calling for a new "day of struggle", urging supporters to assemble the following morning to "break the siege" of the Susa Valley. The statement rejected the authorities' eviction order, denounced what it described as the militarization of the valley, praised the resistance carried out during the previous week's clashes, and called for the continuation of direct action against the Turin–Lyon high-speed railway. Several Italian media outlets described the communiqué as a "call to arms", arguing that it openly encouraged further confrontation with the authorities. A banner displayed at the camp read, "Throw stones, not tighten your belt. Don't lower your guard—strike back.".

Later the same day, Deputy Prime Minister and Minister of Infrastructure and Transport Matteo Salvini responded by calling for the dissolution of the No Tav movement, stating that it should be treated as a terrorist organization. According to Salvini, the attacks on the construction sites, the violence against law enforcement officers and the latest communiqué from Venaus demonstrated that the movement had evolved from a protest campaign into an organized campaign of violence against the State. His remarks marked one of the strongest responses by a senior member of the Italian government since the escalation of violence in late July and sparked renewed political debate over the legal status of the movement.
