= El Estrecho Natural Park =

Protected area in Andalusia, Spain

Coordinates: 36°01′52″N 5°38′27″W

El Estrecho (The Strait) Natural Park (Spanish: Parque Natural del Estrecho) is a natural park in Spain, located on the northern side of the Strait of Gibraltar.

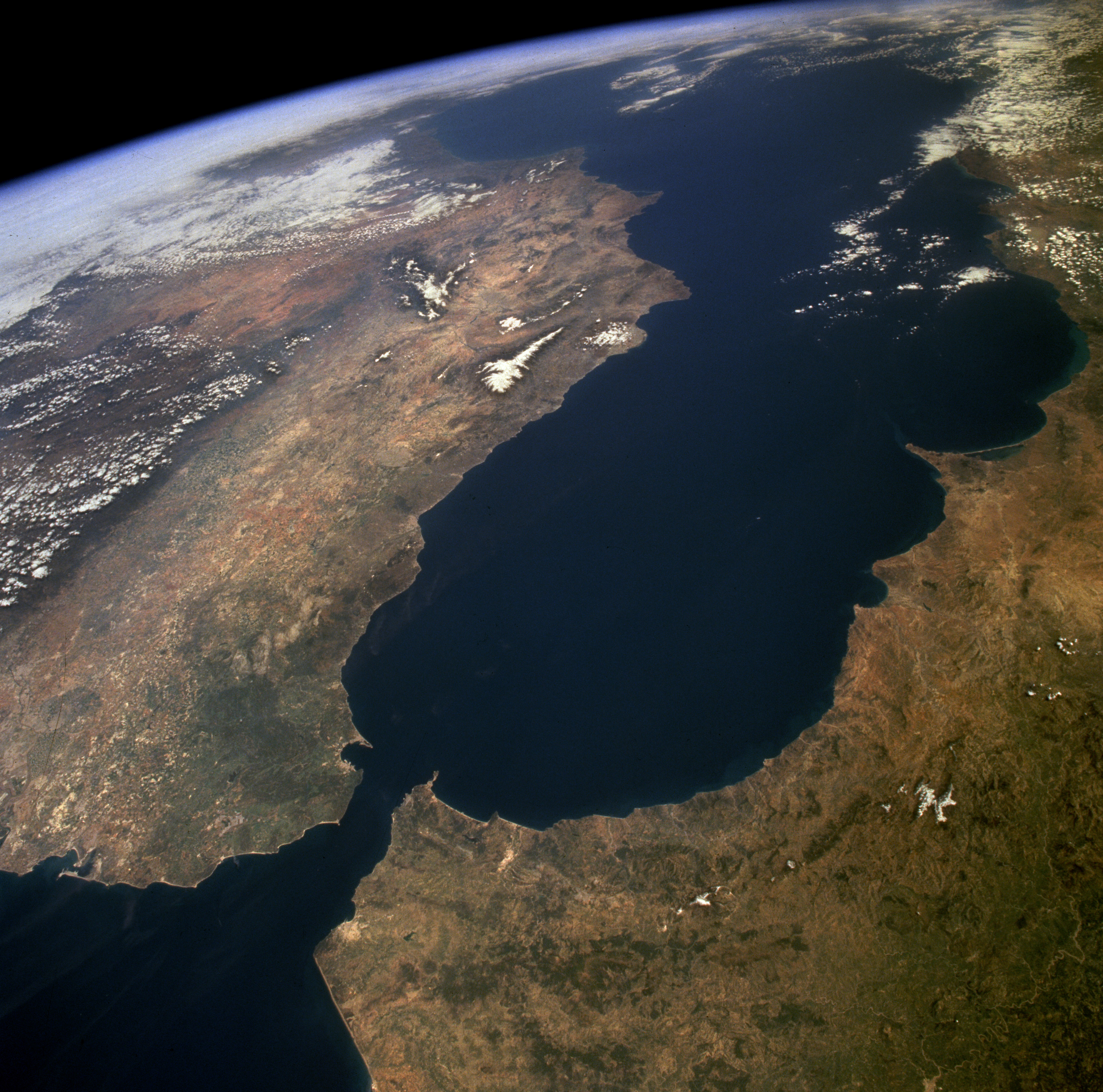
The Strait of Gibraltar as seen from space (North is to the left: Spain is on the left and Africa on the right)

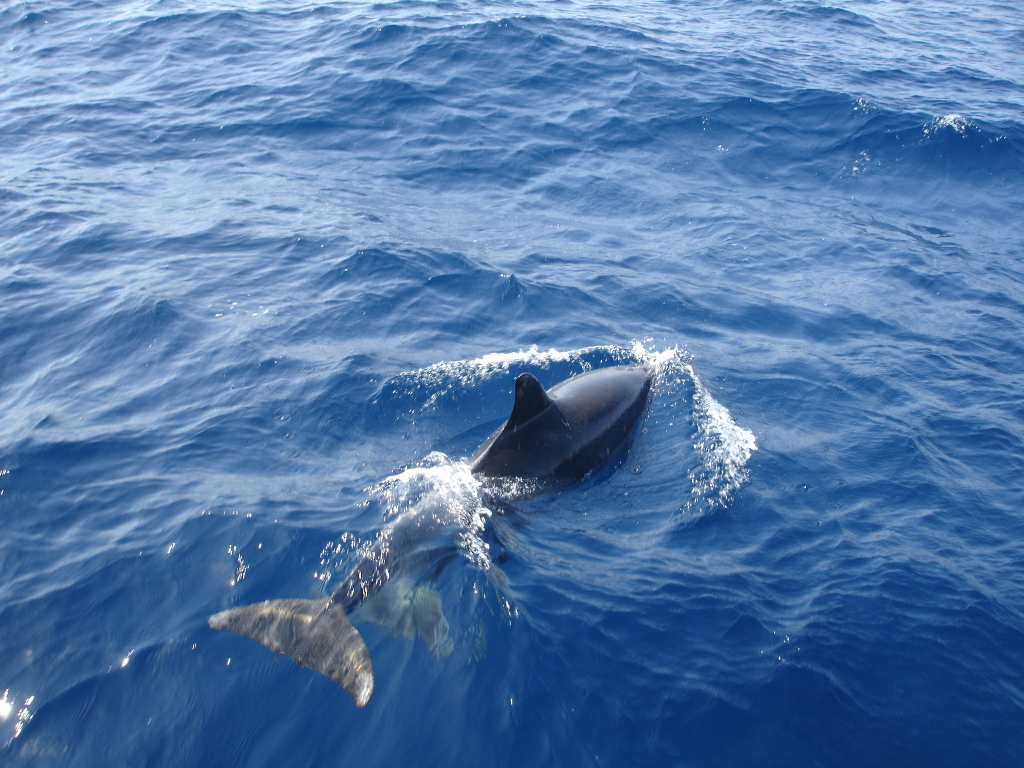
Cetacea in the strait

Comprising 189.1 square kilometres, it was declared a natural park in 2003. The park is located at the southernmost point of mainland Spain, and of mainland Europe, making it the southernmost park of Europe. The location at the point where the Atlantic Ocean and the Mediterranean Sea meet in the Strait of Gibraltar places it on the migratory route for many birds.

== Description ==
Estrecho Natural Park is located on the southern tip of the Iberian peninsula and protects the area of the coast from the Bay of Getares (Algeciras) to Cape Grace (Tarifa). It was declared a nature reserve in the year 2003 and is a protected area of 18,910 hectares. It is the most southerly protected area of the European continent and unites ecological, scenic, historical and cultural themes. It is part of the Transcontinental Biosphere Reserve of the Mediterranean since it was designated in 2006.

The east coast of the park is on the Mediterranean Sea and west coast is on the Atlantic Ocean. The Strait of Gibraltar, which links these seas and separates Europe from Africa, is a stopping point for migratory birds and marine mammals. The distance between the two continents is only 14 km and from prehistoric times this step is also a transit path for humans.

The union of two oceans makes unique marine environment that houses an exceptional biodiversity of extraordinary interest. The climate of the area is characterized by mild temperatures and a dry season and a total lack of rain.

Like all parks in Andalusia, El Estrecho Natural Park has a management board and an advisory body to the Governing Board. Since its creation, the conservative director of the park is Jesus Cabello Medina, forest engineer, who has enjoyed a career in the Ministry of Environment. The Governing Board is chaired by Sena Ildefonso Rodríguez, journalist and professor, re-elected in February 2008 for his second term.

== Geology ==
The park is located in the foothills of the Betic Cordillera, part of the geological unit of Algeciras which extends to the north of Morocco. Algeciras unit consists of Margo Flychs Arenic-mica of the Oligocene – early Miocene, postorogenic land are located in the west of the park and are unique to the Quaternary, are mainly alluvial deposits.

The main geological formations of the park are the mountains of The Hub and The Kid, with respect to coastal formations include karst submarine.

== Hydrology ==
In eastern and due to the high slopes of the mountains of the hub there is no river wide entity, although several small rivers and runoff, among these rivers stands the river Guadalmesi and Marchenilla river valleys that form; in the west the ground is lower and there are located the Jara River and the de la Vega that are wetlands at its mouth.

== Flora and fauna ==
Within the park you can find different ecosystems, each with its flora characteristic, the Mediterranean scrub is the most abundant, contains species such as palms, heather, mastic, erguen, matagallo and other xerophytic species, forests are mainly cork alternating in some areas with introduced pine species in the riparian or canutos predominantly Andalusian gall along the rhododendron or hornbeams and numerous species of ferns.

As for the fauna include birds that make their migration from Africa to Europe in numbers of tens of thousands. There are an abundance of large mammals themselves are in the nearby Parque Natural de los Alcornocales due to rough terrain and predominantly creeping vegetation type, thus it can be found mongoose, genets and other small mammals. Regarding the flora and fauna have been found underwater meadows of angiosperms in several areas of the park but due to the wing of the waves are not high concentrations. The marine fauna is exceptionally narrow, numerous species of cetaceans whales, dolphins, orcas, sperm whales, blue whales, etc.

== History ==
The earliest evidence of human journey through these lands are the remains of Neanderthals found in the Rock of Gibraltar. That may correspond to one of the world's last populations of this group of people. Additionally, there are remains of the earliest modern humans in the area, from the Lower Paleolithic. There are about 34 known caves and shelters with rock art and funerary structures and dolmens different representative periods from the Palaeolithic to the Cueva del Moro to the Bronze Age of the Tombs of the Algarbes with veranda megalithic burials.

Later, the territory was populated by many of the civilizations in the area. Within the park boundaries are sites like Cala Arenas, Carthaginians, Romans and Claudia Baelo or medieval as the Hill Campus of the Gallows or the Castle of Tarifa.

Under the waters of the park are many wrecks, mostly from the modern age.
