= Fuerte de San Diego =

San Diego Fort
- Fuerte de San Diego (Spanish)
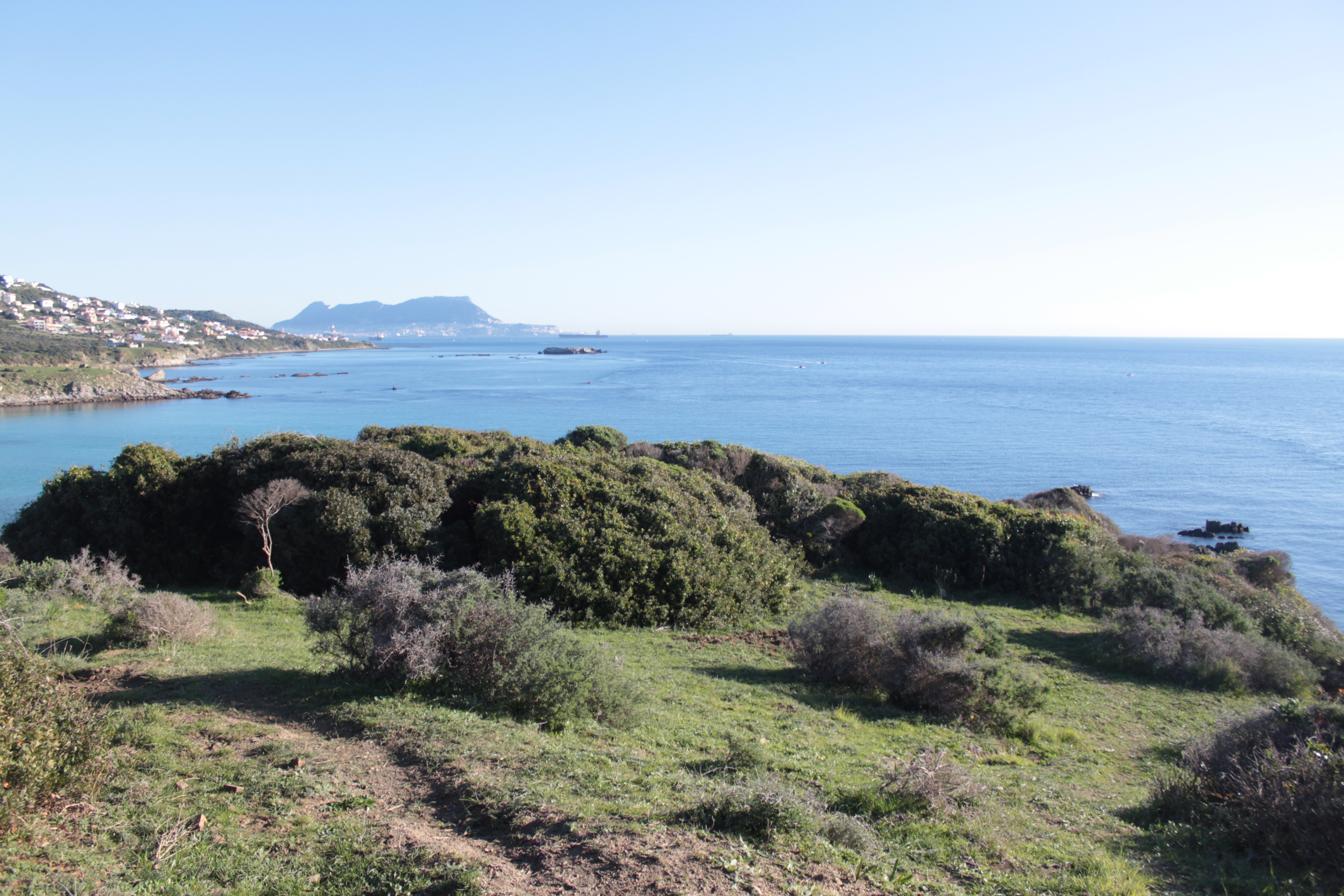
- the remains today with Gibraltar in the background

- Location within Province of Cádiz Location within Spain
- 36.0583°N 5.4486°W
- Location: Algeciras, Spain

History
- Built: 1730

Spanish Cultural Heritage

The ruins of Fuerte de San Diego (Spanish: Fuerte de San Diego) are the remains of a castle located in Algeciras, Spain. The castle was built in 1730 following the Capture of Gibraltar in 1704.

== History ==
The Fort of San Diego in Algeciras was a military installation built around 1730 as a result of the policy of fortification of the area near Gibraltar undertaken by the government of Spain .

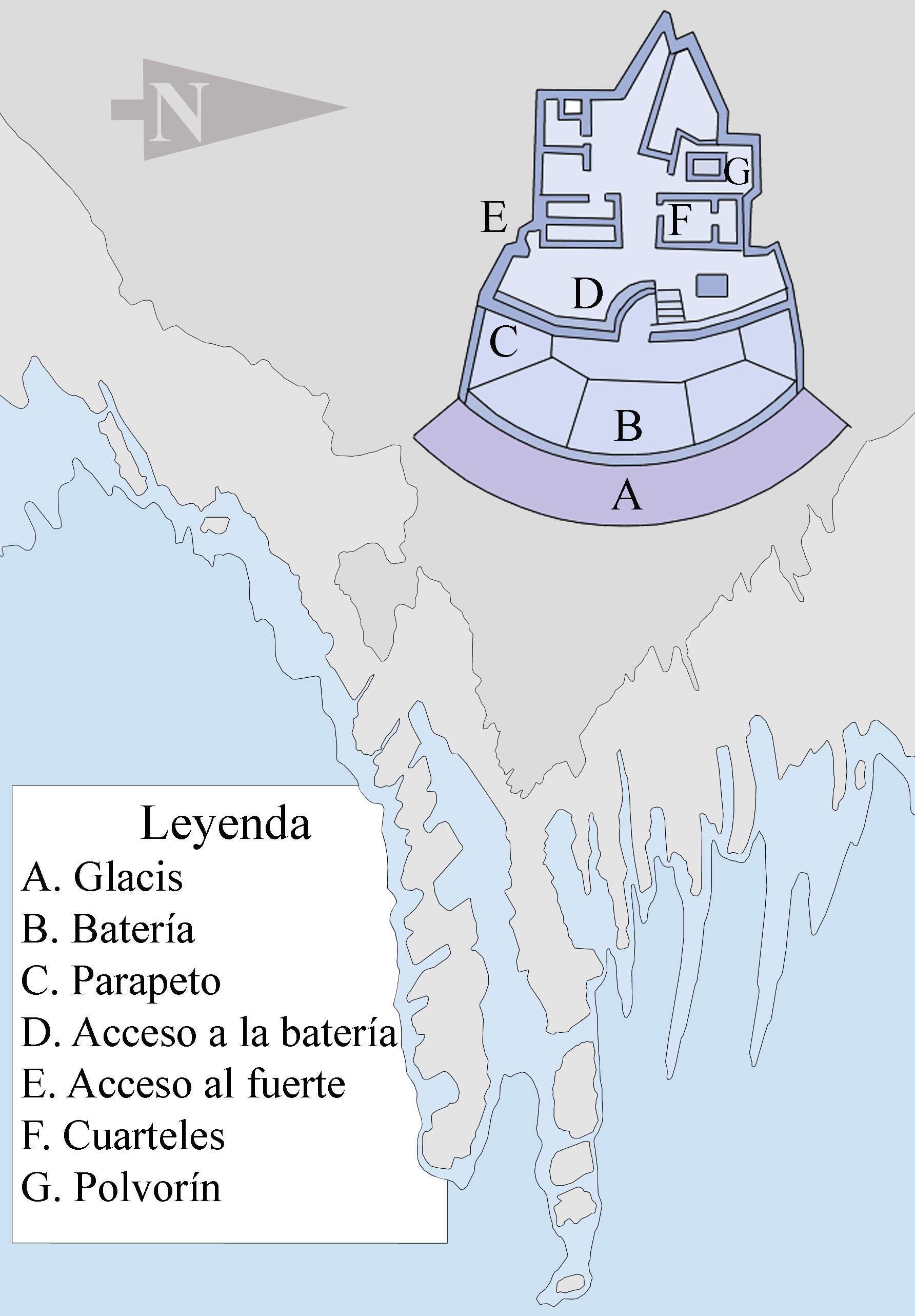
A schematic of the fort

This fortification was one of the batteries in the Bay of Gibraltar created from the loss of Gibraltar in 1704 to protect the city from the possibility of a British invasion of Spain. These forts prevented British ships from taking shelter in the harbour. The fort was located in Punta del Fraile. This was an important landmark with the Fort Punta Carnero which was located north of this position.

The fort was destroyed in 1811 during Spain's alliance with the United Kingdom against Napoleon (as were) almost all the forts in the area. The tower however is just remaining.

The British destroyed the Spanish fortifications around Gibraltar in to deny their use by Napoleon's forces. The main Spanish lines were destroyed by Colonel Sir Charles Holloway on 14 February 1810 to the satisfaction o crowds who had come to see the spectacle. Following the main explosion other towers were destroyed and volunteers took away the rubble.
