= Mirador del Estrecho =

Scenic overlook in Spain

Coordinates: 36°03′14″N 05°33′01″W

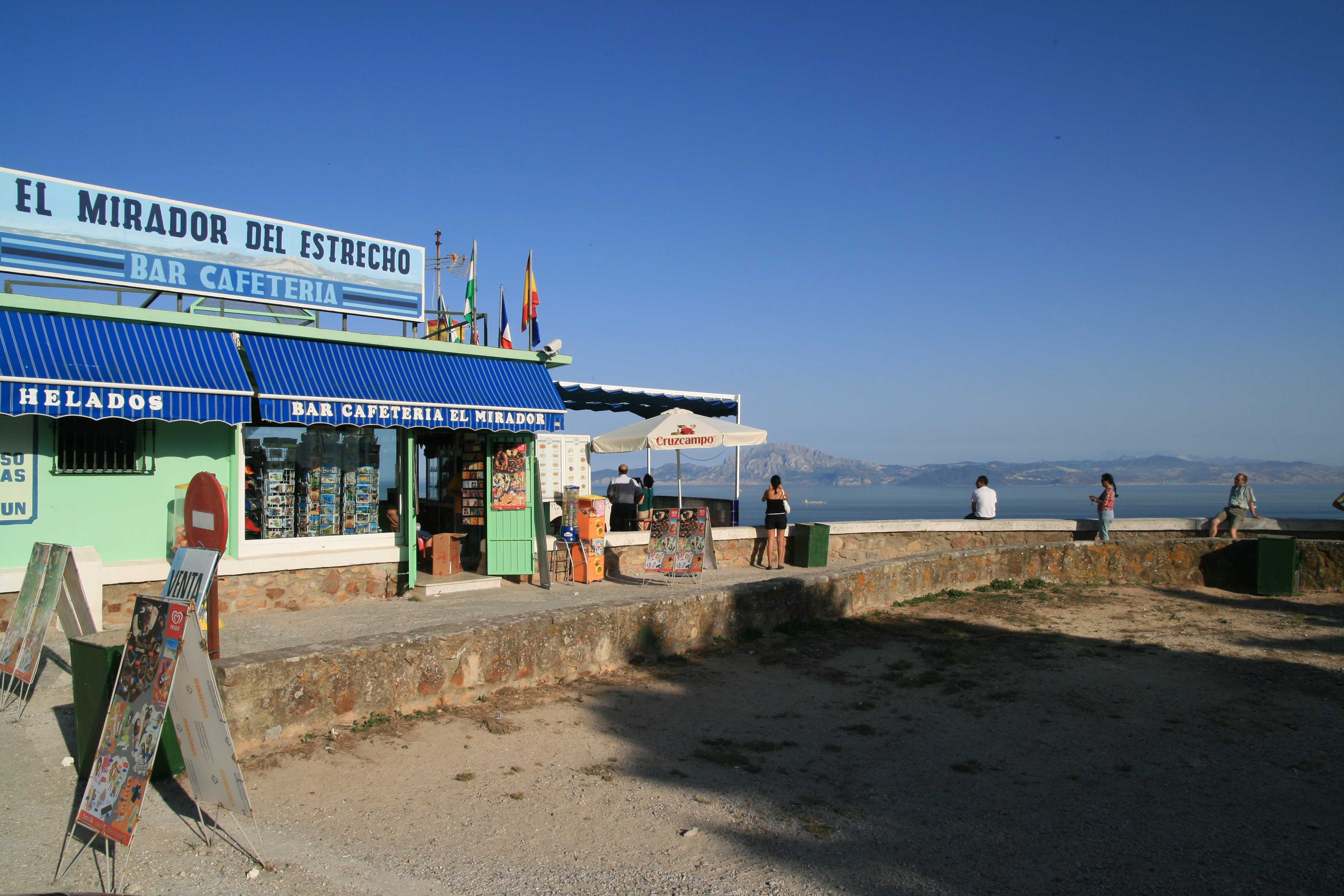
The shop at the overlook, with a terrace alongside. Jebel Musa in the background.

The Mirador del Estrecho (Spanish pronunciation: [miɾaˈðoɾ del esˈtɾetʃo]; English: Overlook of the Strait) is a scenic overlook over the Strait of Gibraltar located within the municipal borders of Tarifa, Spain, 6 kilometres (3.7 mi) from its urban centre. The overlook is 300 metres (980 ft) above sea level and can be reached via the N-340 road.

The scenic overlook provides outstanding views over the Strait of Gibraltar and the African coast just opposite. On clear days, it is possible to have an uninterrupted view of the Spanish city of Ceuta (with Monte Hacho), at the East end of the coast (to the left); Jebel Musa, the highest elevation on the coast (the most likely African Pillar of Hercules, Abyla); and the Moroccan port of Tanger-Med (to the right of Jebel Musa).

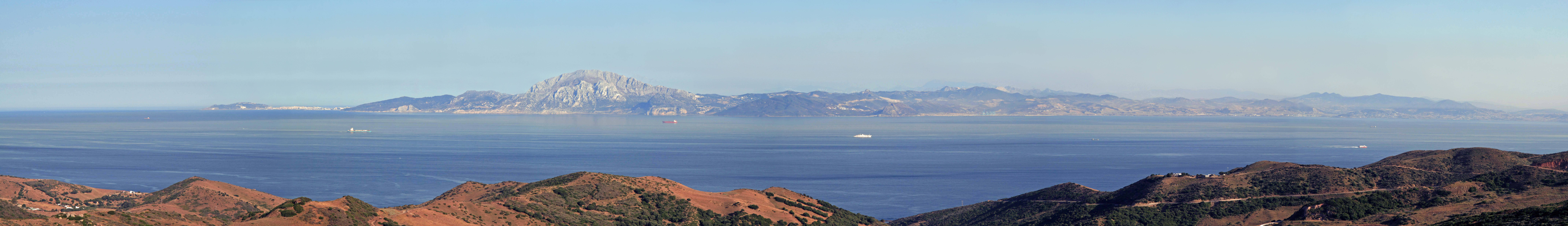
View from the Mirador del Estrecho. Ceuta lies on the right end of the African coast. Jebel Musa is the highest point along the coast.
