= Cape Malabata =

Cape in Morocco

Coordinates: 35°49′N 5°44.9′W

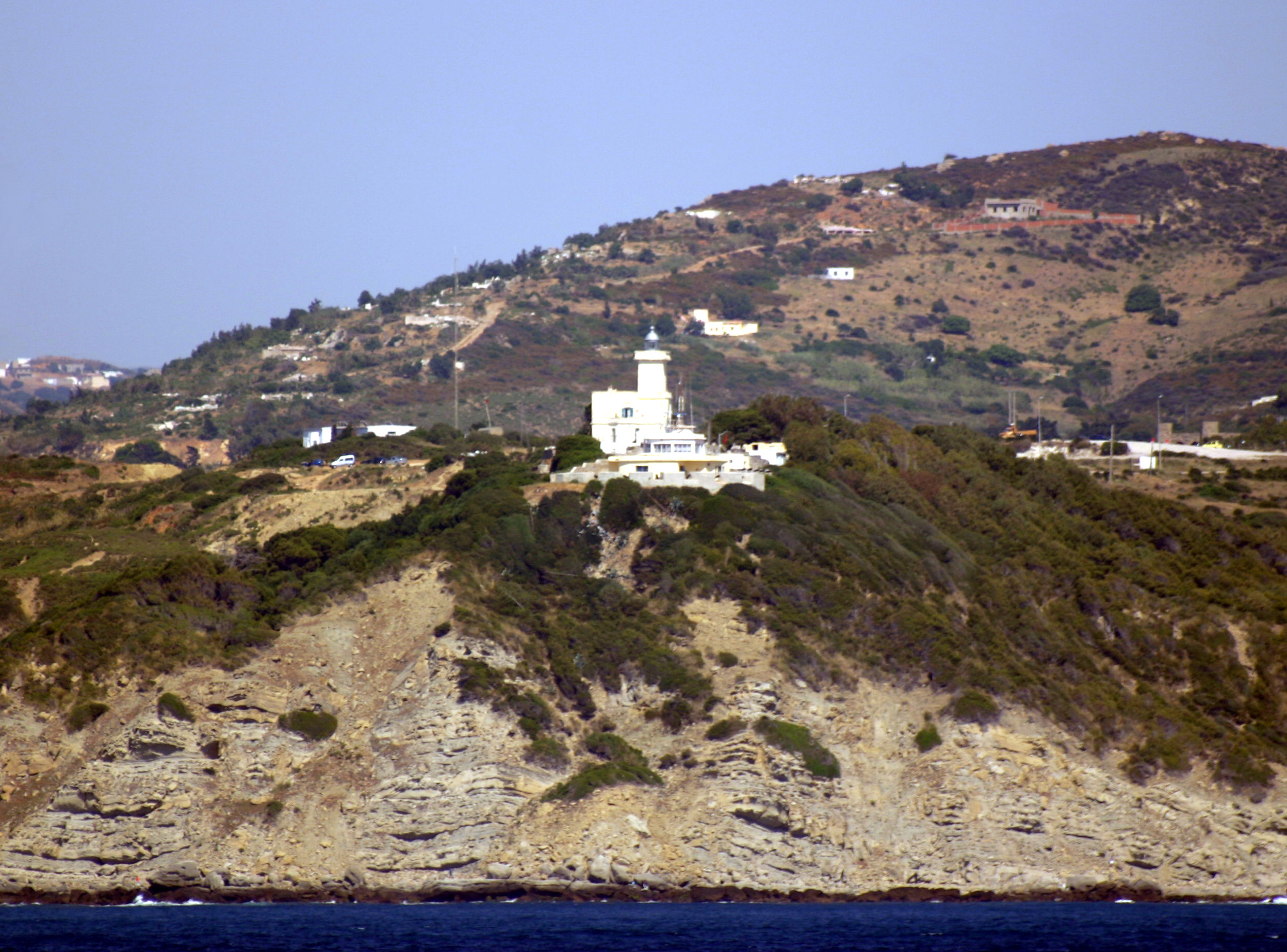
Lighthouse of Cape Malabata

Cape Malabata (Arabic: رأس ملباطا, Ras Malabata, or Rās al-Manār, "Lighthouse Cape"; French: Cap Malabata; Spanish: Punta Malabata) is a cape located about 6 miles (10 km) east of central Tangier, Morocco, facing the Strait of Gibraltar. The cape features a lighthouse and a medieval-style castle that was built in early 20th century.

== Tunnel ==
In 2003, a Strait of Gibraltar crossing was proposed that would have linked Cape Malabata to Punta Paloma in Spain. Years of studies have, however, made no real progress thus far.

== See also ==
- Cape Spartel
