= Saint-Martin-de-la-Porte =

Saint-Martin-de-la-Porte Sin Martïn (Savoyard)
- Commune
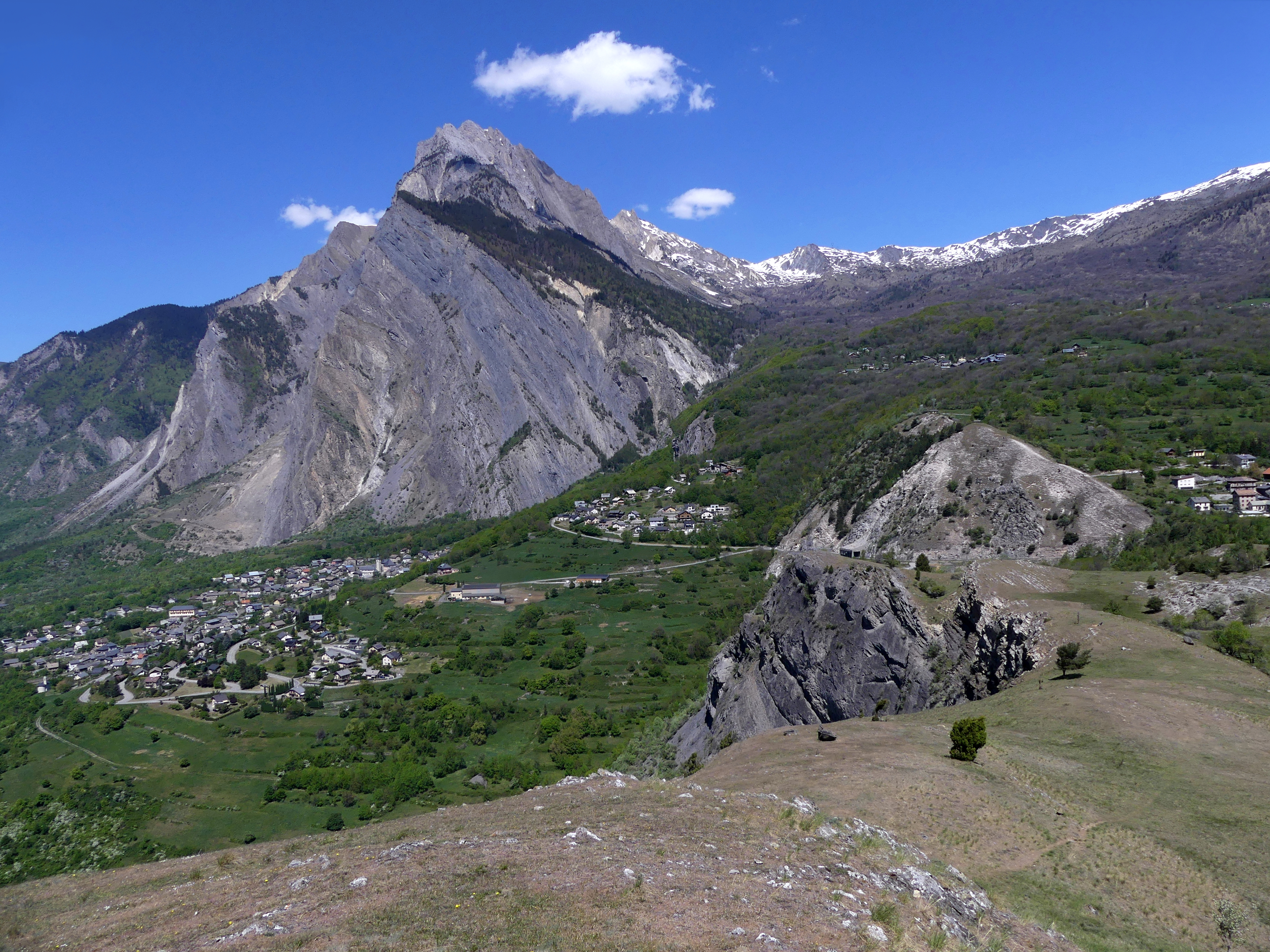
- Location of Saint-Martin-de-la-Porte
- Location within France Location within Auvergne-Rhône-Alpes
- Coordinates: 45°14′27″N 6°26′48″E
- Country: France
- Region: Auvergne-Rhône-Alpes
- Department: Savoie
- Arrondissement: Saint-Jean-de-Maurienne
- Canton: Modane
- Intercommunality: Maurienne-Galibier

Government
  - Mayor (2020–2026): Guy Ratel
- Area^{1}: 19.25 km^{2} (7.43 sq mi)
- Highest elevation: 2,824 m (9,265 ft)
- Lowest elevation: 655 m (2,149 ft)
- Population (2023): 698
  - Density: 36.3/km^{2} (93.9/sq mi)
- Time zone: UTC+01:00 (CET)
  - Summer (DST): UTC+02:00 (CEST)
- INSEE/Postal code: 73258 /73140
- ^{1} French Land Register data, which excludes lakes, ponds, glaciers > 1 km^{2} (0.386 sq mi or 247 acres) and river estuaries.

Saint-Martin-de-la-Porte (Savoyard: Sin Martïn) is a commune in the Savoie department in the Auvergne-Rhône-Alpes region in south-eastern France. It is best known as the location of one of the access points for the boring of the main tunnel of the Turin–Lyon high-speed railway.

== Toponymy ==
Saint-Martin-de-la-Porte is mentioned in medieval documents under the forms de Porta in the 11th century, Parrochia Sancti Martini around 1100, Parrochia S. Martini in 1200, Apus S. Martinum de Porta in 1297, ecclesie S. Martini de Porta in 1310, parrochie Sancti Martini de Porta in 1372, and Curatus Sancti Martini de Porta in the 14th century.

Locally, the commune is also known as Saint-Martin-la-Porte, a form used by the municipal website.

The commune is named after its patron saint, Martin of Tours, a 4th-century bishop of Tours. The element Porte comes from an old village crossed by the Roman road, and was added to the parish name towards the end of the 13th century to distinguish it from places with the same saint's name. According to Ernest Nègre, porte in Franco-Provençal designates a narrow passage or defile.

In Arpitan, the name of the commune is written Sin Martïn according to the Conflans orthography.

== See also ==
- Communes of the Savoie department
