= Rio Marchenilla =

River in the province of Cadiz, Spain

Marchenilla is a small river (8 km long) in the Province of Cadiz, located in Campo de Gibraltar. It is born in the Sierra del Bujeo, at an altitude of about 500 msl, having to save a great slope in its high section. It flows next to the village of Algamasilla and empties at the beach of Getares (Playa de Getares), south Algeciras. Geologically three sections are distinguished: the head of triassic materials, the middle section of oligocene materials, and the final section of triassic materials.
