= Lyon Turin Ferroviaire =

Company tasked with developing the Lyon-Turin high-speed rail line

Lyon Turin Ferroviaire (LTF), a subsidiary of Réseau Ferré de France (RFF) and Rete Ferroviaria Italiana (RFI), was the early developer of the joint French-Italian part of the future rail link between Lyon and Turin. It has now been replaced in that role by Tunnel Euralpin Lyon Turin (TELT), with the same staff and leadership.

The critical part of this planned line is the 57.5 km (35.7 mi) Mont d'Ambin Base Tunnel between Saint-Jean-de-Maurienne in France and the Susa Valley in Italy.

In November 2007, the European Commission granted €671.8 million (up to 30% of its total value) to the transborder section of the Lyon-Turin link through its multiannual TEN-T program (2007-2013).

This contribution of the EU lies within the global financing of €2.1 billion in favor of the transborder section of the Lyon-Turin for 2007-2013 period. Italy and France bring the major part of these financing.

== See also ==
- NRLA
- Brenner Base Tunnel
- TAV
- TGV
- Turin–Lyon high-speed railway
