= Patrick Hunt =

Patrick Hunt may refer to:

- Patrick Hunt (archaeologist) (born 1951), American archeologist and author
- Patrick Hunt (basketball coach), Australian basketball coach
- Patrick Hunt (footballer), Scottish footballer
- G. Patrick Hunt (born 1949), Canadian politician in the Nova Scotia House of Assembly
