= British Alpine Hannibal Expedition =

1959 experiment carrying an Asian elephant across the Alps

The British Alpine Hannibal Expedition was an experimental archeology event that took place in 1959. British engineer John Hoyte led an expedition that tried to reenact aspects of Hannibal's crossing of the Alps during the Second Punic War in 218 BCE. The group took the female Asian elephant Jumbo, provided by a zoo in Turin, from France over the Col du Mont Cenis into Italy.

== Background ==
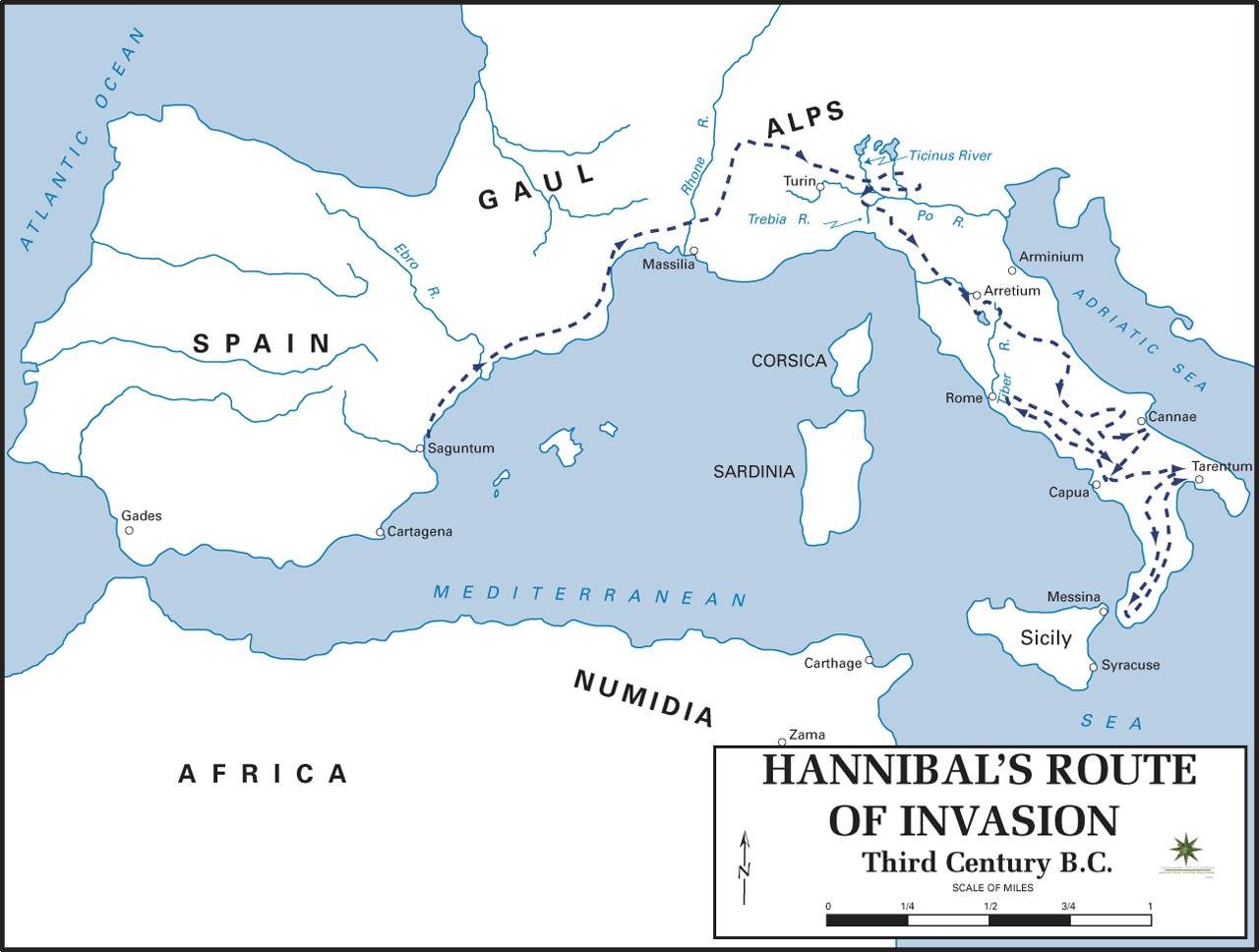
One possible invasion route proposed for Hannibal's army

After the Carthaginian defeat in the First Punic War of 264–241 BCE, Hamilcar Barca secured an extensive territory in the Iberian Peninsula for Carthage. At the beginning of the Second Punic War in 218 BCE, his son Hannibal took an army of perhaps 50,000 men and 37 war elephants from Hispania (modern Spain) to Italy, where he led a 15-year campaign against Rome. Hannibal avoided the coastal route, and took his army over the Alps. His march has been described by ancient historians Polybius and Livy. The route has been subject of long and inconclusive scholarly discourse. In his 1955 book Alps and elephants: Hannibal's march, Gavin de Beer lists 12 possible candidates from 30 different books.

== The expedition ==
In 1955, The Times published a debate about the route Hannibal might have taken over the Alps. This debate came to the attention of John Hoyte, then an engineering student at Cambridge University. Hoyte had an interest in both history and mountain climbing, and spent the summer of 1956 with friends hiking the Alps and comparing possible routes to the ancient descriptions. The group came to the conclusion that the Col de Clapier was the most likely pass, an opinion still supported by some modern historians.

A few years later, a friend suggested testing this theory with an elephant. Hoyte wrote letters to the British consuls in Lyon, France, Geneva, Switzerland, and Turin, enquiring about the possibility of obtaining an elephant for the experiment, but without a serious expectation of success. The Turin Zoo had just acquired a female Asian elephant, Jumbo, who was trained as a circus animal. The owner of the zoo volunteered Jumbo and became the first sponsor of the expedition. Hoyte put together a team of eight people, including Richard Jolly as the expedition secretary and Colonel John Hickman, Lecturer (later Reader) in Veterinary Surgery at the University of Cambridge Veterinary School, who had gained experience with elephants during World War II in Burma. The group obtained insurance for Jumbo from Lloyd's of London and further sponsorship from Life magazine, which later published a 7-page photo report.

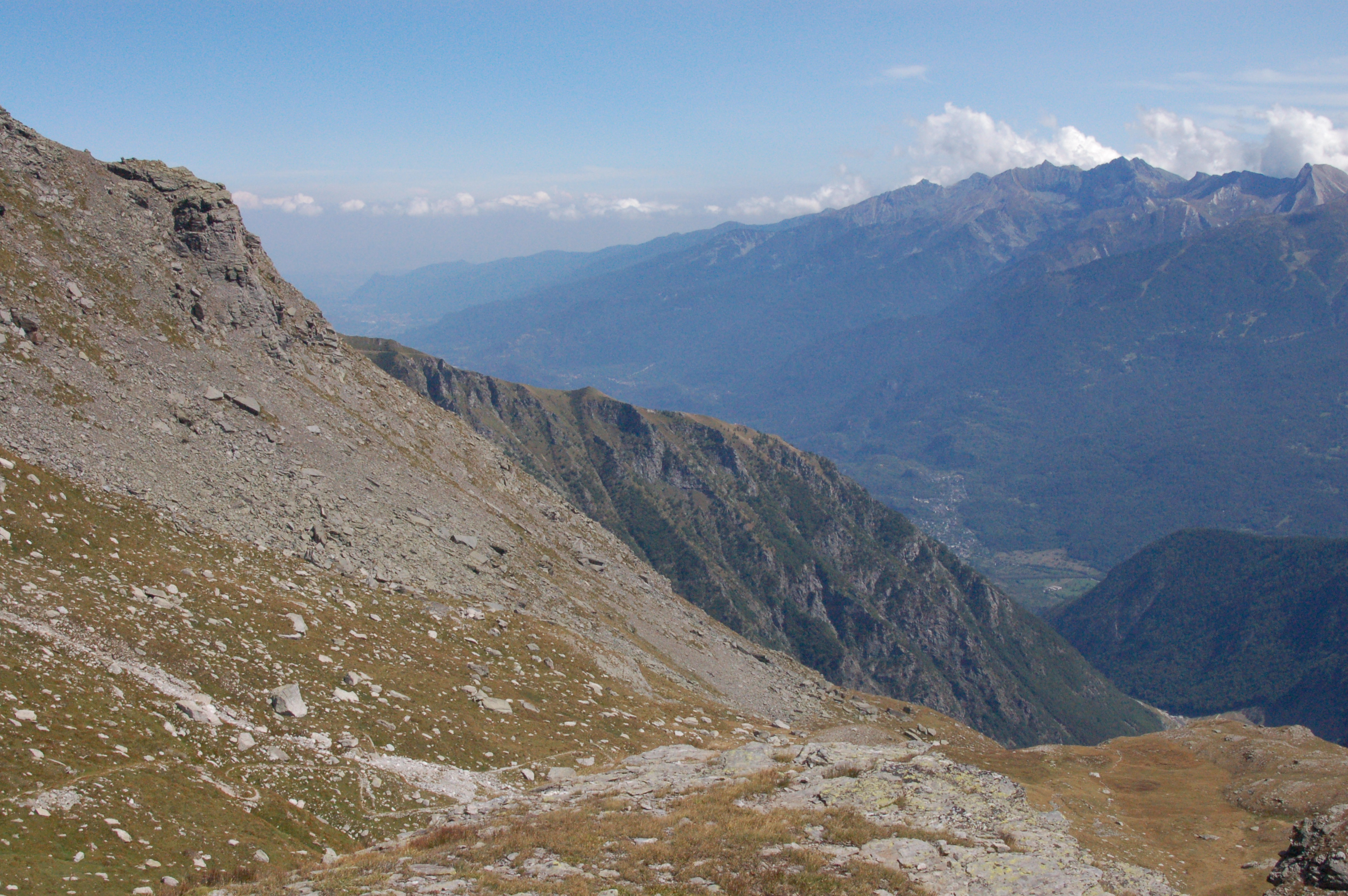
The originally planned route led over the Col de Clapier

The expedition started in late July 1959 in Montmelian, France. It followed the valley of the Arc river and then ascended towards the Col de Clapier. The route up to the pass had become narrower and dangerous due to rockfall. The group retreated down the valley and crossed the Col du Mont Cenis, another pass suggested for Hannibal's route by the emperor Napoleon. After ten days of travel, the expedition "invaded" Susa in Italy.

The members of the expedition originally planned to call the 5,700 lb (2,600 kg) elephant Hannibella but the animal would not respond to the new name and thus remained Jumbo. Jumbo was 11 years old and equipped with leather boots and knee pads for the most treacherous passages. A specially made coat was provided to keep her warm. Despite a diet consisting of 150 lb (68 kg) of hay, 50 lb (23 kg) of apples, 40 lb (18 kg) of bread, 20 lb (9.1 kg) of carrots, and a vitamin B supplement per day, she lost an estimated 300 lb (140 kg) during the first four days and nearly 500 lb (230 kg) in total. On arrival in Italy, she consumed cake and a Magnum bottle of Chianti.

In 1960, Hoyte published a report on the expedition as Trunk Road for Hannibal: With an Elephant Over the Alps. Expedition member Cynthia Pilkington published the book "Elephant Over the Alps" in 1961, telling the story of the expedition.
