= Mont Malamot =

Mountain of the Cottian Alps

- Italian: Monte Malamot; French: Pointe Droset
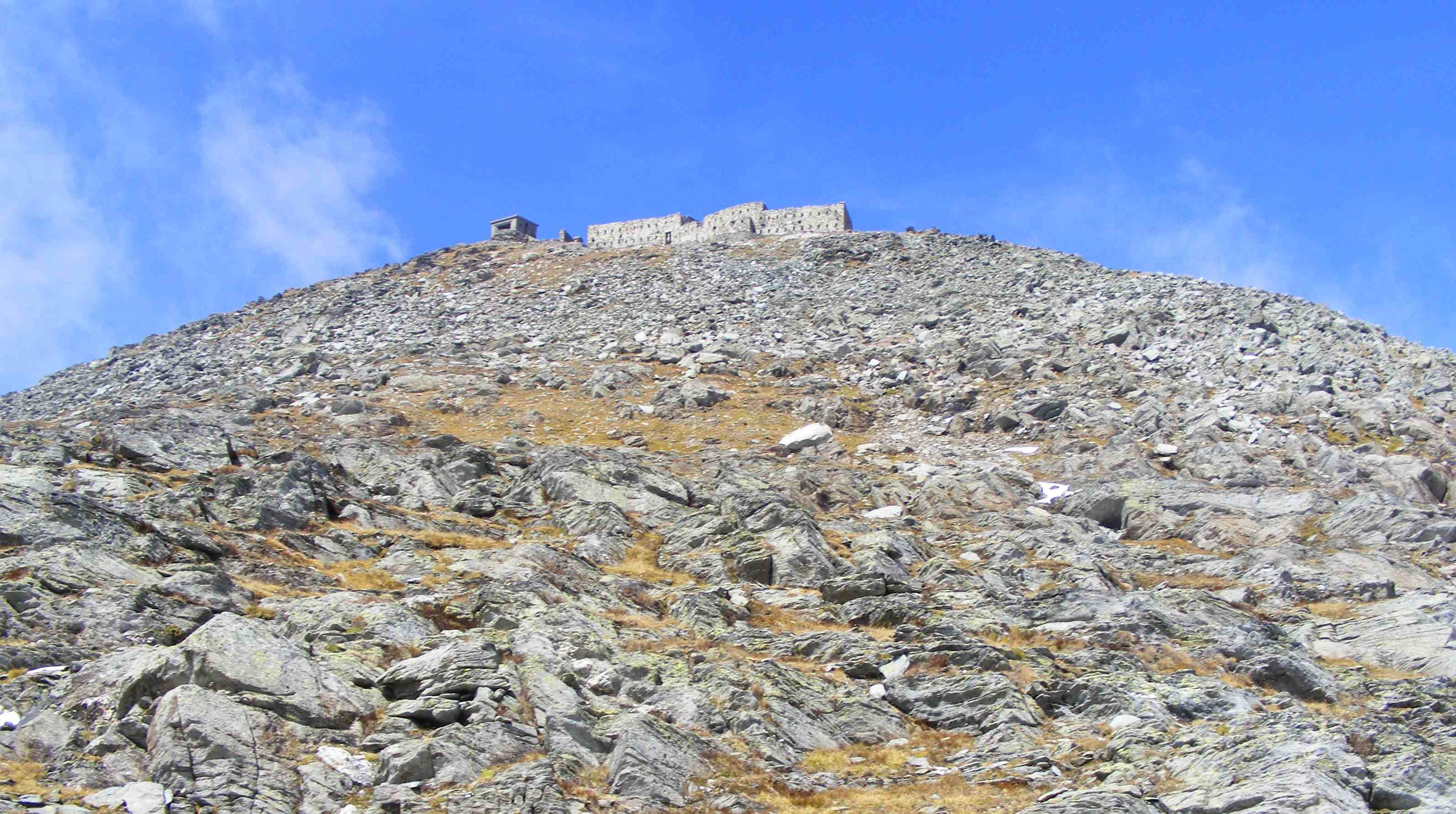
- Mont Malamot from south-east.

Highest point
- Elevation: 2,917 m (9,570 ft)
- Prominence: 334 m (1,096 ft)
- Isolation: 1.71 km (1.06 mi)
- Coordinates: 45°12′05″N 6°54′31″E

Geography
- Location within France
- Location: Savoy, France
- Parent range: Cottian Alps

Mont Malamot (Italian: Monte Malamot; also called Pointe Droset in French) is a mountain in the northern Cottian Alps, near the Mont Cenis pass. It has an elevation of 2,917 metres (9,570 ft).

== History ==
Nowadays entirely included in French territory, it separates the valleys of Dora Riparia and Arc. At the top is a large fortification built by the Italian Regio Esercito in 1889, on two floors, which could house some 200 troops. The area was further fortified in 1932-1940 during the construction of the Alpine Wall.

== Sources ==
- Aruga, R.; Losana, P; A. Re (1985). Alpi Cozie Settentrionali. San Donato Milanese: CAI-TCI.
