= Mont-Cenis Lake =

Lake in the Mont-Cenis massif

Coordinates: 45.237°N 6.933°E

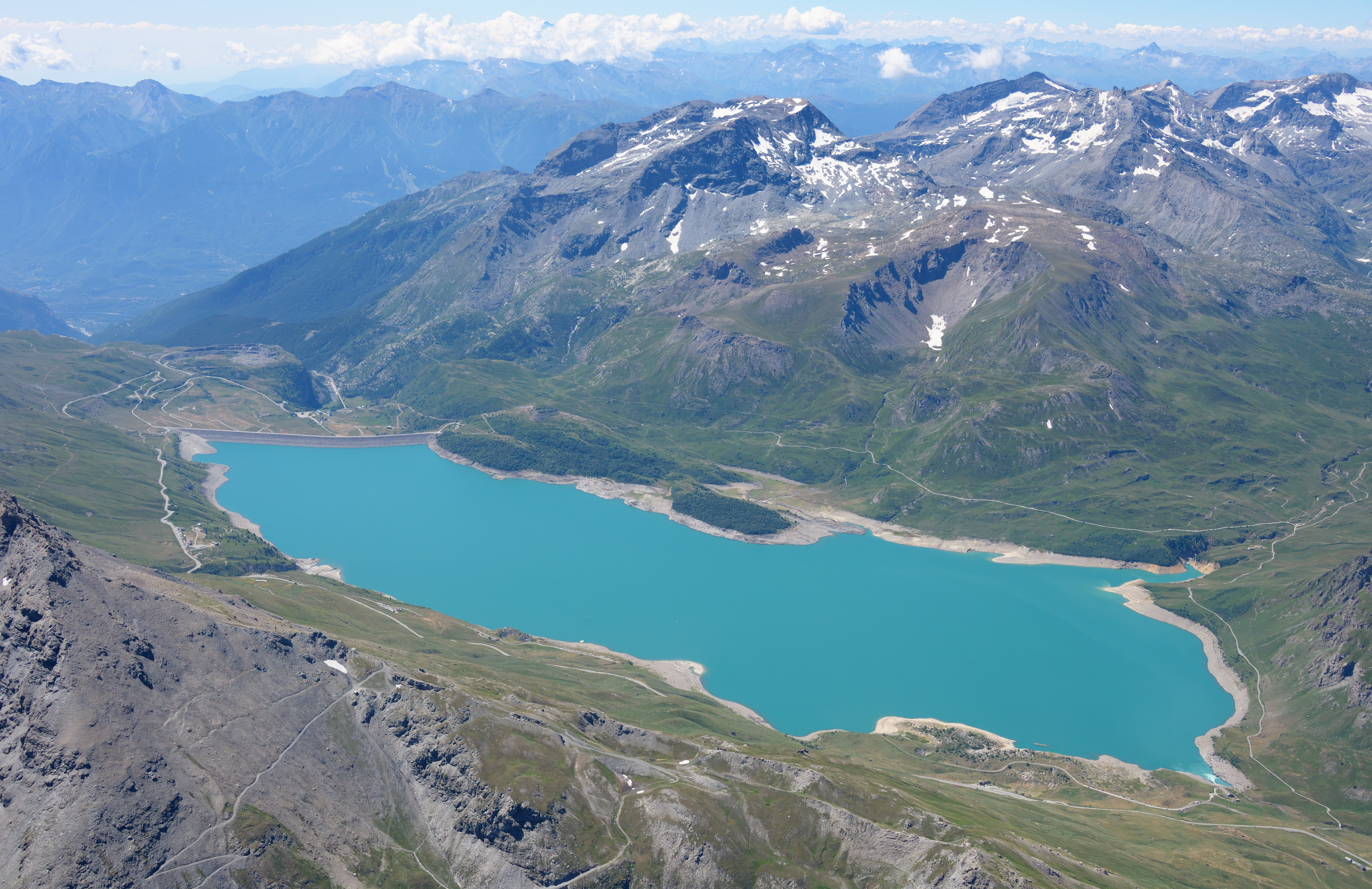
- Interactive map of Mont-Cenis Lake
- Location: Val-Cenis, Savoie, France

Mont-Cenis Lake is a lake located in the Mont-Cenis massif at an altitude of 1,974 meters (6,476 ft) in the municipality of Val-Cenis in France. It is situated at the top of the Cenise valley, on the Italian side of the Mont-Cenis pass, the most frequented passage on the Lyon-Turin-Milan axis during the Middle Ages between Western Europe and the Italian peninsula. This was while the Montgenèvre pass required an initial crossing, followed by the Lautaret pass, and the Petit-Saint-Bernard pass was 107 meters (351 ft) higher.

== Location ==
If a capacity of 315 million m^{3} (11.1 billion cu ft) is attributed to this reservoir lake, it is the sixth most important artificial water retention in France (in terms of volume), located at nearly 2,000 meters (6,600 ft) above sea level. Being entirely within French territory, the lake is situated on the Italian side of the Mont-Cenis pass. Historically, culturally, and economically linked to the Maurienne valley, the area is administered by the municipality of Val-Cenis. Surrounding the lake are notable peaks such as the Grand Mont-Cenis (3,377 m; 11,079 ft), Pointe de Ronce (3,612 m; 11,850 ft), Pointe du Lamet (3,504 m; 11,496 ft), Mount Giusalet (3,312 m; 10,866 ft), Pointe Droset (2,917 m; 9,570 ft), and Petit Mont-Cenis (3,162 m; 10,374 ft).

Due to its location, the natural outlet of the lake is the Cenise (Cenischia in Italian), which itself flows into the Doire Ripaire, a tributary of the Po River. Therefore, the lake is part of the Po River basin.

== Contemporary history ==
The Treaty of Paris in 1947 saw the territory of the Maurienne province expand by an area of 81.79 km^{2} (31.58 sq mi). This new border line now encompasses the Mont-Cenis pass and valley, crossing the watershed line. The 1947 demarcation was made for two reasons: firstly, as part of Italy's war reparations to France, annexing this valley protected the region from potential new military invasions; and secondly, to return these territories to the Savoyard communes of the Lanslebourg-Mont-Cenis canton in Haute Maurienne. The annexation treaty of Savoy in 1860 had placed these alpine pastures on the other side of the newly created border, thus restoring Maurienne to its historical boundaries.

=== Hydroelectric development ===
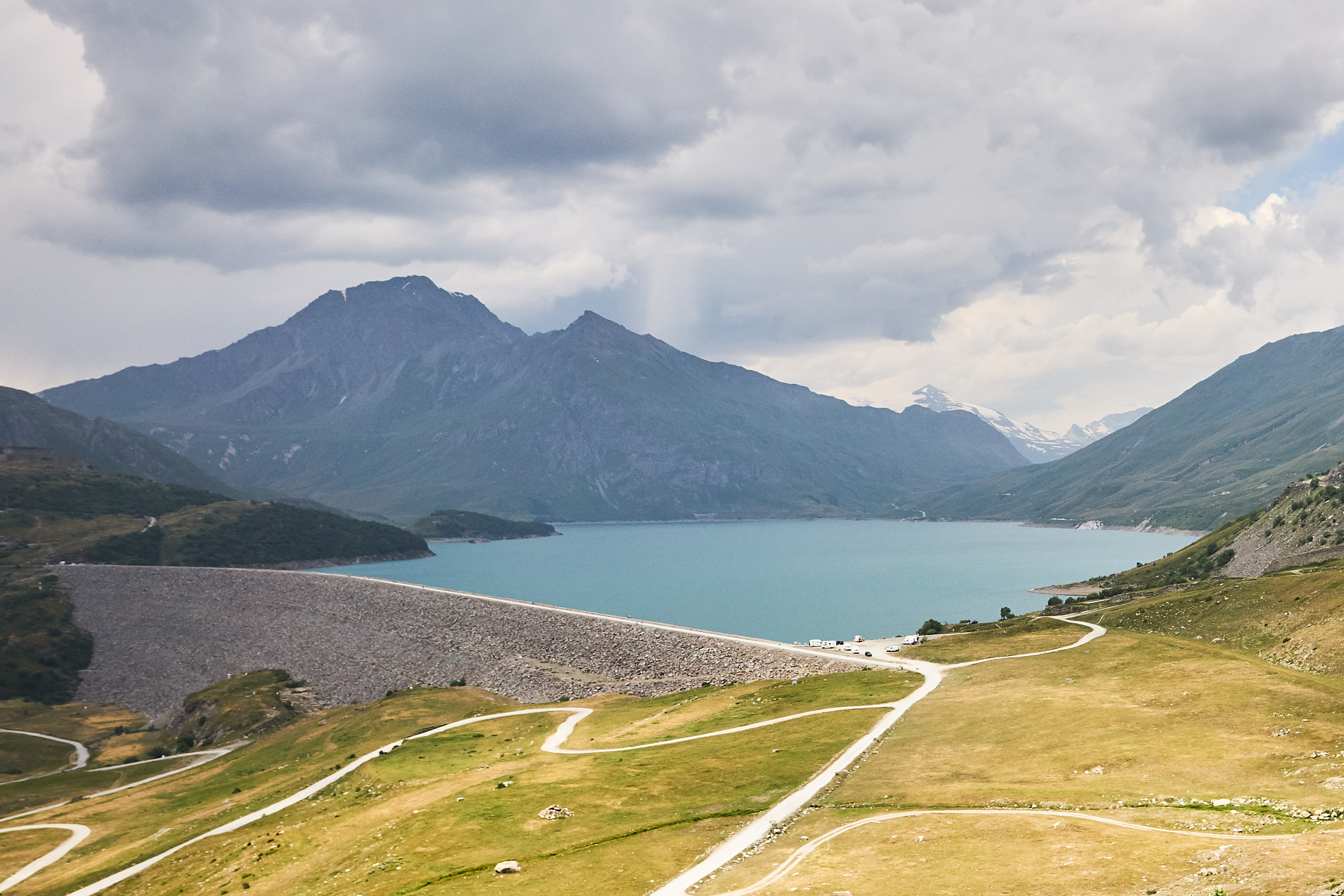
Mont-Cenis

Logically, EDF undertook the complete hydroelectric development of the Arc valley between 1962 and 1969. The choice of the reservoir site, at the center of the system, was made in the 1960s on the Mont-Cenis plateau, which had been integrated into French territory since the peace treaty with Italy in 1947. This plateau offered the advantages of high altitude and a wide natural basin topography, ensuring a significant drop in elevation and high capacity. The major challenge was anchoring the reservoir dam on solid geological foundations if using the traditional method. The solution of an earth dam, resistant to pressure due to its mass, or a gravity dam with a central clay core for waterproofing, similar to those at Tignes or Roselend, was impossible. However, drawing from the experience gained at Serre-Ponçon in the Durance valley, EDF opted for a rockfill dam. The quantities of earth used were comparable: 15 million m^{3} (530 million cu ft) here compared to 14 million m^{3} (490 million cu ft) elsewhere. The Mont-Cenis dam exceeds others in length (1,500 meters [4,900 ft] compared to 620 meters [2,030 ft]) but is thinner at the base (550 m [1,800 ft] compared to 650 m [2,130 ft]) and slightly shorter (115 m [377 ft] compared to 122 m [400 ft]).

The Mont-Cenis reservoir has a capacity of 320 million m^{3} (11 billion cu ft). Natural inflows are limited due to the modest surface area of the plateau (85 km^{2} [33 sq mi]). The catchment area was enlarged through a network of conduits that artificially divert waters from the upper Arc and its left bank tributaries, Avérole and Ribbon, into the basin. In total, the French contribution accounts for 270 million m^{3} (9.5 billion cu ft), while Italy contributes 50 million m^{3} (1.8 billion cu ft).

The waters accumulated in the reservoir at the maximum level of 1,974 meters (6,476 ft) are partly directed towards the Italian hydroelectric plant of Venaus, located at the foot of the dam, falling 1,355 meters (4,446 ft) and producing an average annual output of 230 million kWh. The French portion is harnessed in the Villarodin-Bourget plant, with an 880-meter (2,890 ft) fall through an 18-kilometer (11 mi) tunnel that also collects water from the Ambin and Saint-Anne tributaries of the Arc. In the best years, 600 million kWh are injected into the international power transmission grid, mostly towards Italy in exchange between EDF and ENEL.

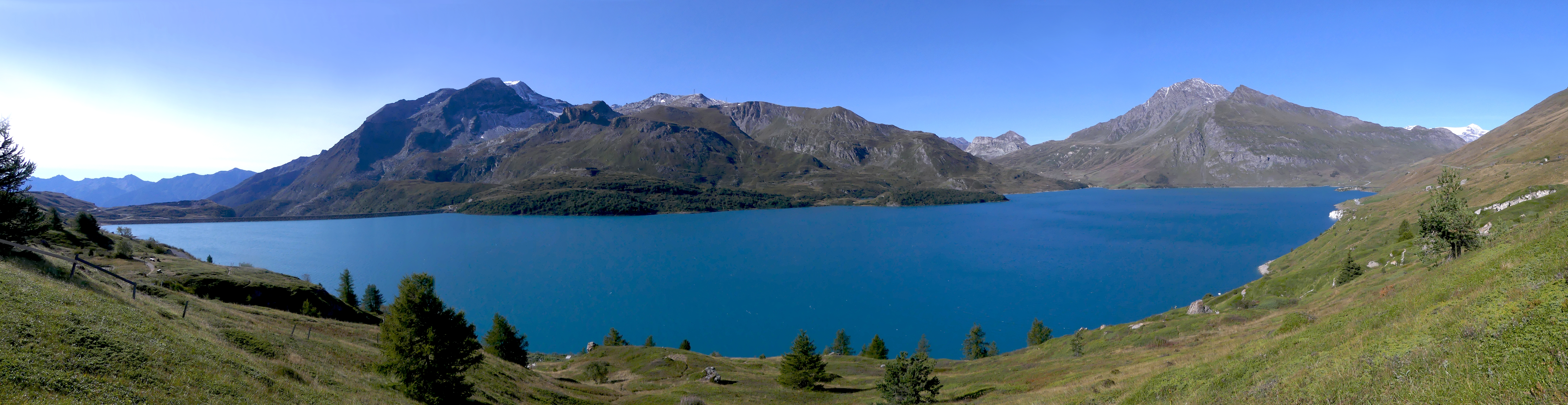
Panorama of Lake Mont Cenis

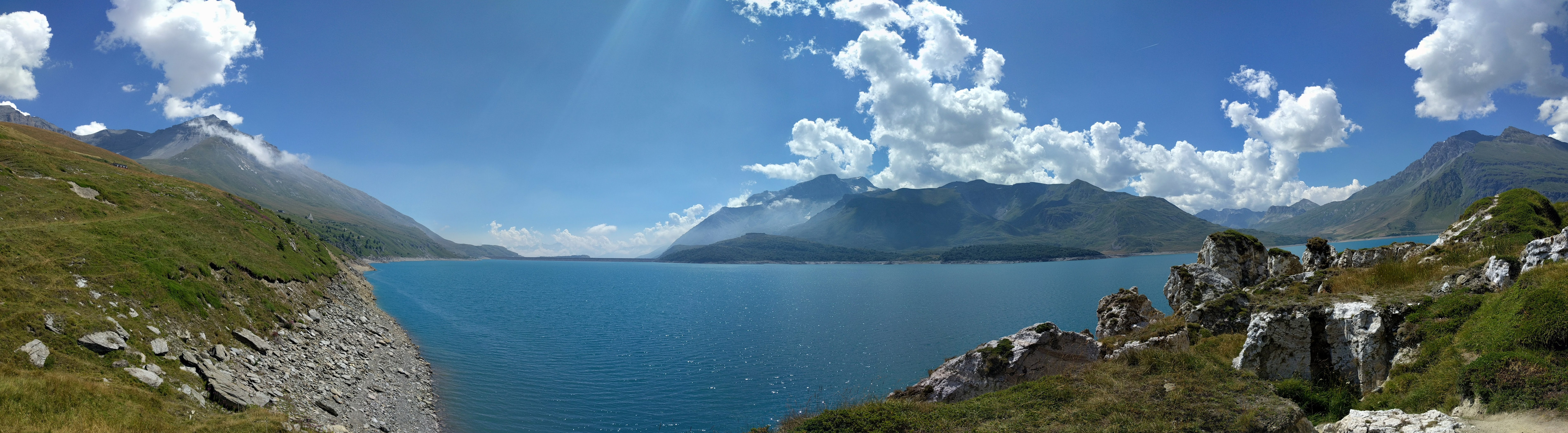
Panorama of Lake Mont Cenis

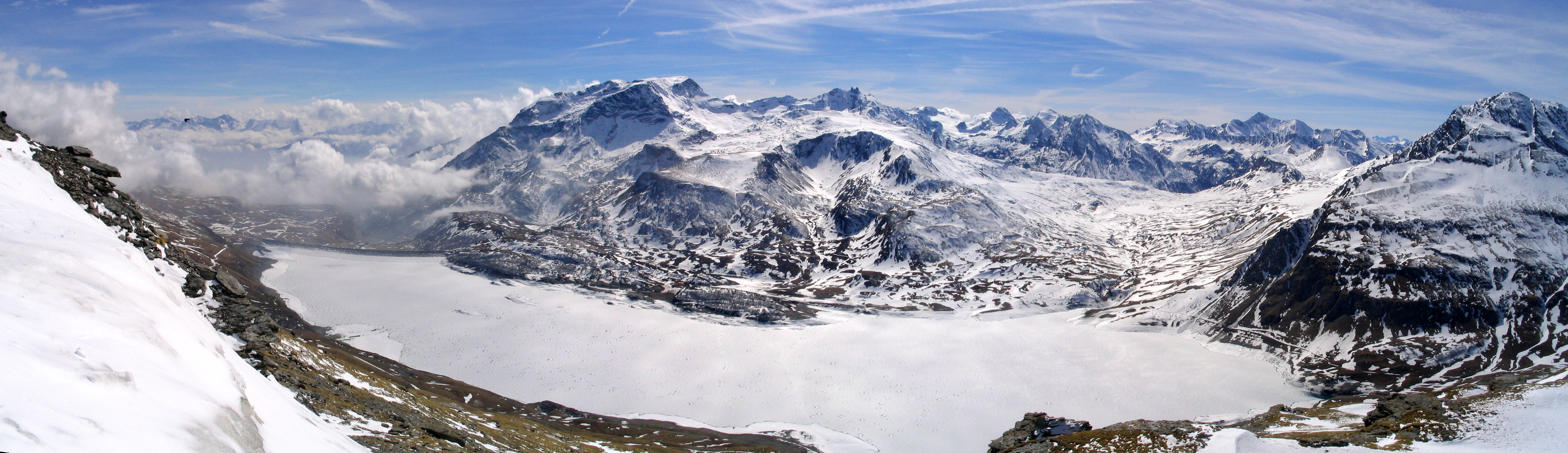
Mont-Cenis Plateau in Haute Maurienne; in the background, Mount Giusalet and its glacier, in the center the Petit Mont-Cenis pass, and to the right the signal of Petit Mont-Cenis

=== Environment ===
The construction of the dam between 1962 and 1968 had a direct impact on the pass and its plateau. Centuries-old alpine chalets, the hospice, and its priory were submerged by rising waters. Though this lake had a lesser impact on the local economy compared to its counterpart in Roselend, primarily being a summer grazing area, it definitively altered the landscape of the pass and the way of life for residents in the heart of Haute Maurienne. The construction led to the abandonment of the village of Grand-Croix at the foot of the dam, which until then had been a transit point on the road to Italy.

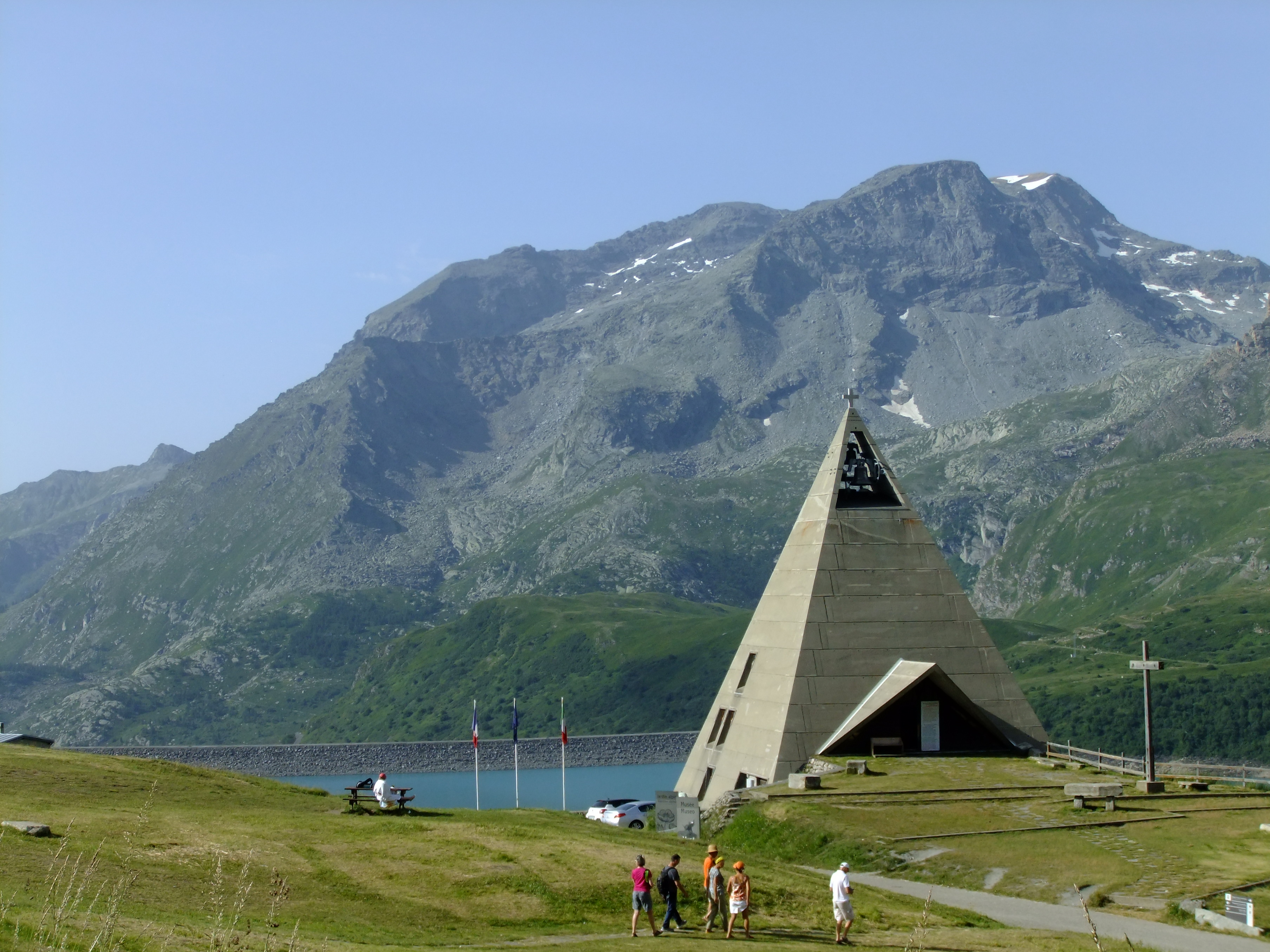
The dam and the pyramid of the chapel and museum

EDF acknowledged the loss of the priory by erecting a chapel in its place, consecrated on July 21, 1968, by André Bontems, Archbishop of Chambéry and Bishop of Maurienne and Tarentaise. Designed by Philippe Quinquet, the chapel takes on a pyramidal shape made of concrete.

In this context, an alpine garden was established in 1970 under the impetus of Father Fritch. Due to lack of maintenance, it deteriorated until the early 2000s. This advanced degradation triggered awareness, and through joint efforts of the Vanoise National Park and surrounding municipalities, a biotope protection zone accompanied by extensive restoration and redevelopment of the alpine garden was established. This valorization was particularly necessary as not only do 700 mountain floral species thrive there, but three of them are exclusively found in this protected space and in the Spitsbergen.

== See also ==
- List of dams and reservoirs in France
