= Col de Clapier =

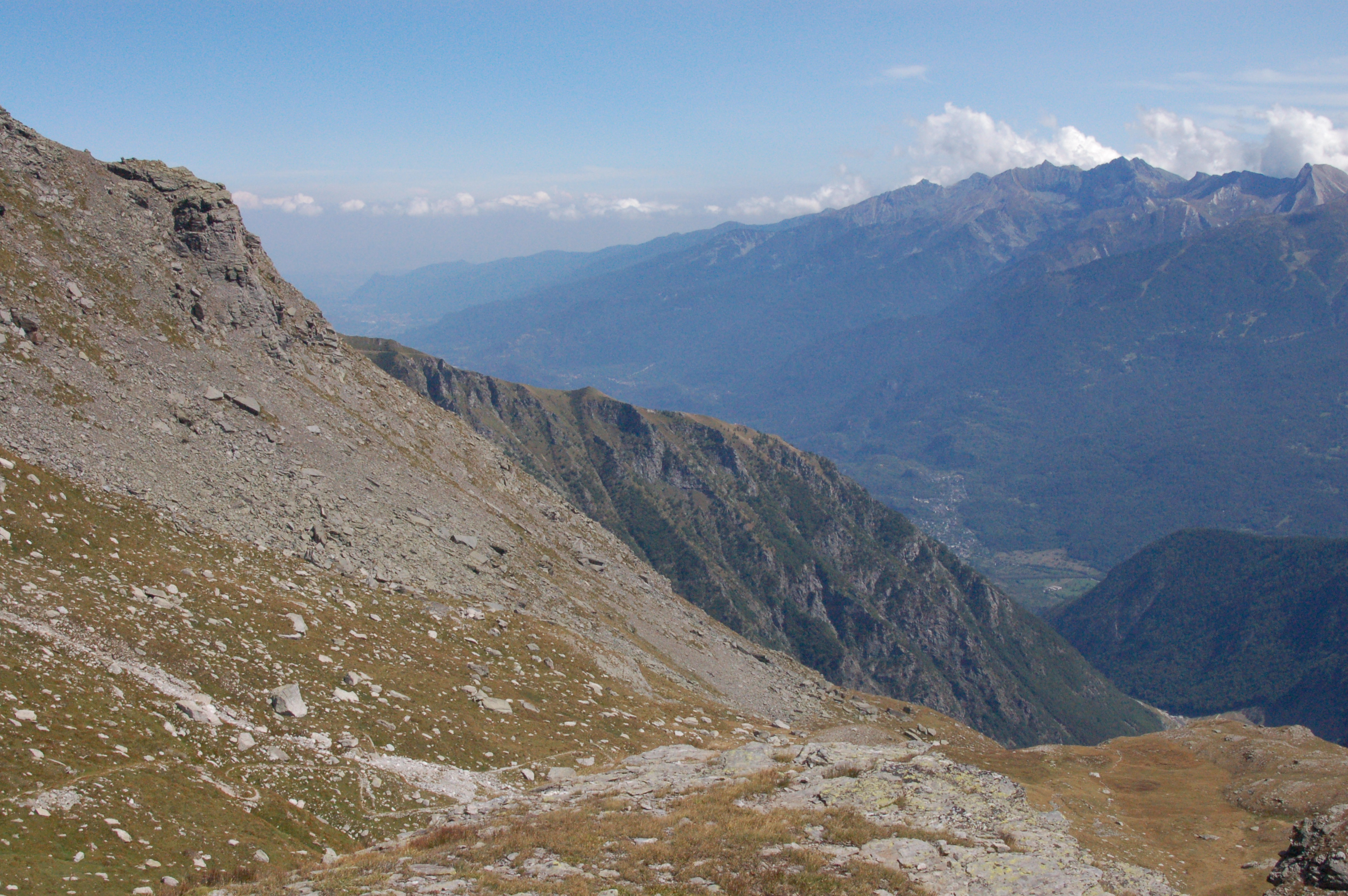
- Col de Clapier, Turin visible at upper left

- Location within Alps
- Elevation: 2,477 m (8,127 ft)

Location
- Location: France–Italy border
- Range: Alps
- Coordinates: 45°10′3″N 6°55′22″E

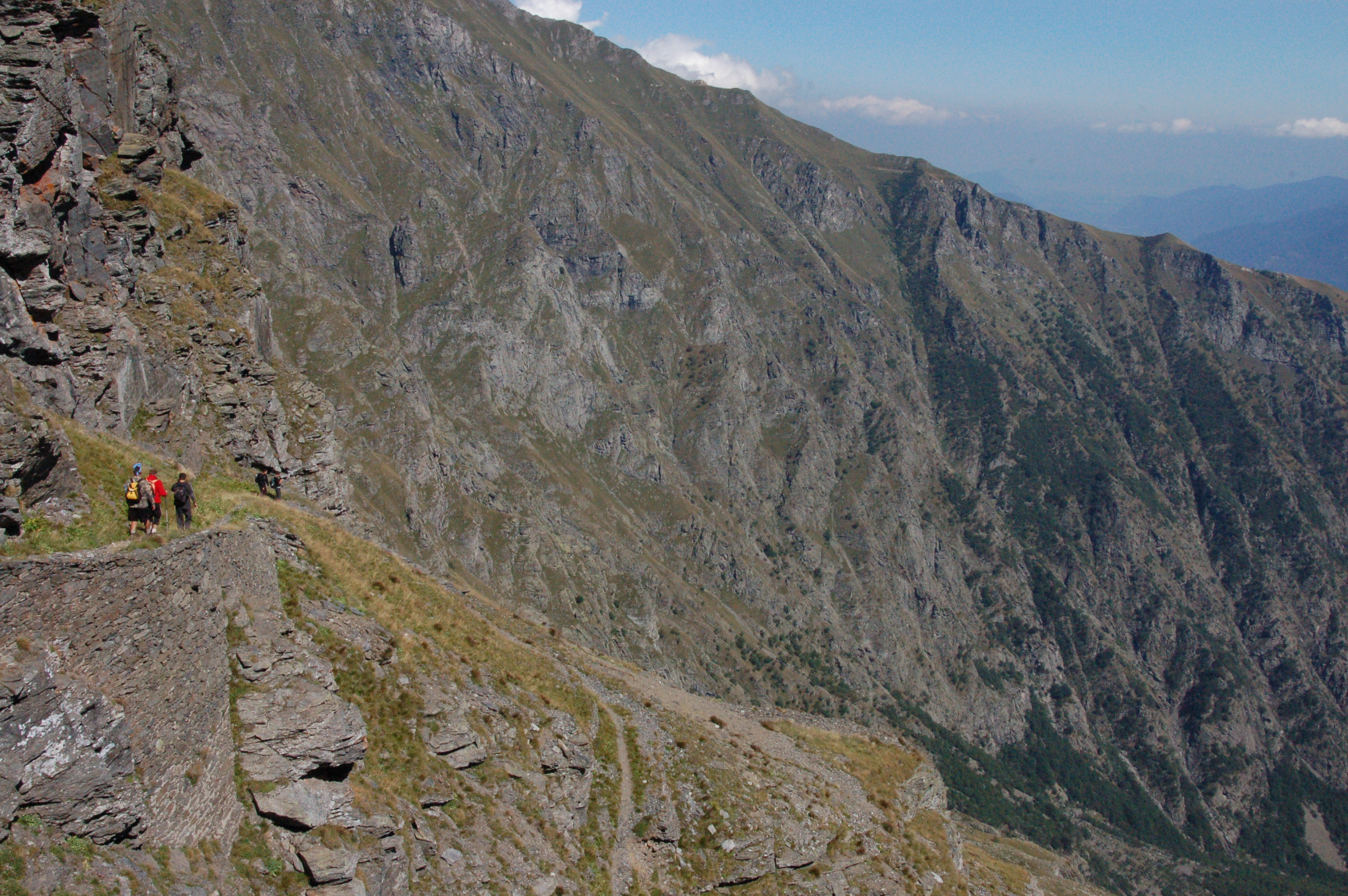
Col de Clapier, descent to Susa

Col de Clapier or Col du Clapier (French Col Clapier or Col de Savine, Italian Colle Clapier) is a 2,477-metre-high (8,127 ft) mountain pass over the mountain massif Mont Cenis in the Cottian Alps and Graian Alps between Savoy in France and Piedmont in Italy. The bridle path goes from Bramans (1220 m) to Susa (503 m). There is no firm road.

== Archaeology ==
The Col de Clapier is considered a possible route for Hannibal's famous passage through the Alps on his journey from the Rhone (in French, Rhône) river valley to Italy.

From 2004 to 2008, Patrick Hunt, a scholar from Stanford University, has led numerous archaeological expeditions through the Col de Clapier to research the possibility and the likelihood of Hannibal using the pass to traverse the Alps with his army. Hunt's research has involved topographical surveys, soil and rock sampling, exploration of the Col de Clapier's various modern and historic routes, and comparisons of Polybius's and Livy's accounts of Hannibal's passage to the regional and local geography. See Hannibal in the Alps: Stanford Alpine Archaeology Project 1994-2006.

In 1959, it was the planned route of the British Alpine Hannibal Expedition, but rockfall made the expedition backtrack and take their elephant into Susa via the Col du Mont Cenis.

== See also ==
- List of highest paved roads in Europe
- List of mountain passes
