= Patrick Hunt (archaeologist) =

American archeologist and author (born 1951)

Patrick Norman Hunt (born February 9, 1951 in California) is an American archeologist and author.

== Education ==
Patrick Hunt earned his Ph.D. in Archaeology in 1991 from the Institute of Archaeology University College London (UCL), with a specialization in Archaeological Science. His dissertation, titled “Provenance, Weathering and Technology of Selected Archaeological Basalts and Andesites”, examined stone use in both Old World (Mesopotamian, Roman, Greek, Assyrian, Canaanite, Egyptian) and New World (Olmec, Aztec, Wari, Inca) contexts.

He also studied papyrology and numismatics at the Institute of Classical Studies, University of London (1988–89), and completed two graduate internships at the U.S. Geological Survey in Menlo Park (1987–88), working in the radiocarbon laboratory and in petrography/optical petrology.

Earlier academic experiences include a summer session at the American School of Classical Studies in Athens (1984), where he studied Greek archaeology and historical topography. At the University of California, Berkeley Hunt studied Classics (1983–84), and returned there as a Postdoctoral Research Fellow in Near Eastern Studies (1994–95).

== Research ==
Dr. Patrick Hunt’s research combines archaeological science, historical topography, and classical studies, with a particular focus on ancient technology, material culture, and geoarchaeology. His doctoral dissertation at the Institute of Archaeology, University College London, examined the provenance and weathering of archaeological basalts and andesites, comparing their use across both Old World and New World civilizations. His primary material of focus is stone across the world from prehistory onward.

Hunt has conducted field research in Europe, Western Asia, Northern Africa and the Americas, and was awarded a National Geographic Society Expedition Council Grant in 2007–2008 for research related to Hannibal. He has been affiliated with National Geographic as an Explorer since that time.

Dr. Patrick Hunt directed the Stanford University Alpine Archaeology Project from 1994 to 2012. The project involved leading a team of researchers and students to the Swiss, Italian, and French Alps for various archaeological projects. As director of the Stanford Alpine Archaeology Project (1994-2012) , Hunt's research on Ötzi and the Alpine environment has been sponsored by the National Geographic Society's Expeditions Council. He served as President of the Stanford Society of the Archaeological Institute of America (1995–2024) and has been a National Lecturer for the AIA since 2009, including being awarded the Norton Lectureship 2022-2023.

In one project, Hunt researches the history of Celtic and Roman presence in the region of the Great St Bernard Pass. In 1996 he discovered the quarry for a temple of Jupiter in the region of the pass. In 2003 he directed a team of researchers and students that discovered a hoard of Roman silver coins at an archaeological site in the Swiss Alps.

In the Hannibal Expedition 2007-2008 sponsored by National Geographic Society, Hunt searched for artifacts of Hannibal's crossing of the Alps in 218 BC, during the Second Punic War. Hunt has investigated 25 alpine passes and is favoring Col de Clapier as the most likely route. In 2011, he was the expert on the Hannibal team for Spike's TV show Deadliest Warrior.

He has been a Fellow of the Royal Geographical Society since 1989.

His publication record includes peer-reviewed articles, encyclopedia entries, and book chapters on topics such as stone research in antiquity, plant technology, lichenometry in the Alps, paleopathology, and the iconography of classical myths and biblical texts in art. He has contributed to journals and books including World Archaeology, BICS, Studia Phoenicia, Journal of Roman Archaeology, African Archaeology Review, Journal of Emerging Infectious Diseases, Wiley-Blackwell’s Encyclopedia of Ancient History, the Bloomsbury Cultural History, Encyclopedia Britannica, and the Acta Antiqua series.

Hunt has authored and edited various books, ranging from general works such as Ten Discoveries That Rewrote History (2007), Hannibal (2017), Dante’s Inferno (2011), to textbooks and monographs on subjects including ancient warfare, biblical archaeology, and the intersection of mythology and art. His output also includes creative works such as poetry, aphorisms, and essays.

His academic service includes participation in national and institutional committees for AIA and judging for the Saroyan International Writing Prize at Stanford University.

Hunt has taught at Stanford University for over 30 years and is an Associate at the UCLA CMRS Center for Early Global Studies. He has also lectured at LMU Munich, University of Toronto, Humboldt University of Berlin, UCLA, Paris-Sorbonne University, among others. He has presented invited talks at numerous global museums, including the British Museum and Liechtensteines LandesMuseum.

== Works ==
Monographs

- Caravaggio (Life & Times), 2004, ISBN 978-1-904341-73-4
- Rembrandt: His Life in Art, 2006, ISBN 0-9763162-8-5
- Alpine Archaeology, 2007, ISBN 978-1-934269-00-8
- Ten Discoveries That Rewrote History, 2007, ISBN 978-0-452-28877-5
- Hannibal, 2017, ISBN 1439102171

Articles

- Rembrandt and the Rembrandthuis Museum, Amsterdam
- The Role of Silenus and Isabella d’Este
- Artist David Roberts and Near Eastern Archaeology
