= Patrick Hunt (footballer) =

Scottish footballer

Personal information
- Full name: Patrick Hunt
- Place of birth: Glasgow, Scotland
- Position: Centre half

Senior career*
Years	Team	Apps	(Gls)
- Shawfield
1923–1928	Hamilton Academical	147	(10)
1928–1930	Burnley	8	(0)
1930–1931	Belfast Celtic		
1931–1932	Alloa Athletic	26	(0)
- * Club domestic league appearances and goals

Patrick Hunt was a Scottish professional footballer who played as a centre half.
