= Mont Cenis =

Mountain in France

Col du Mont Cenis
- Italian: Colle del Moncenisio
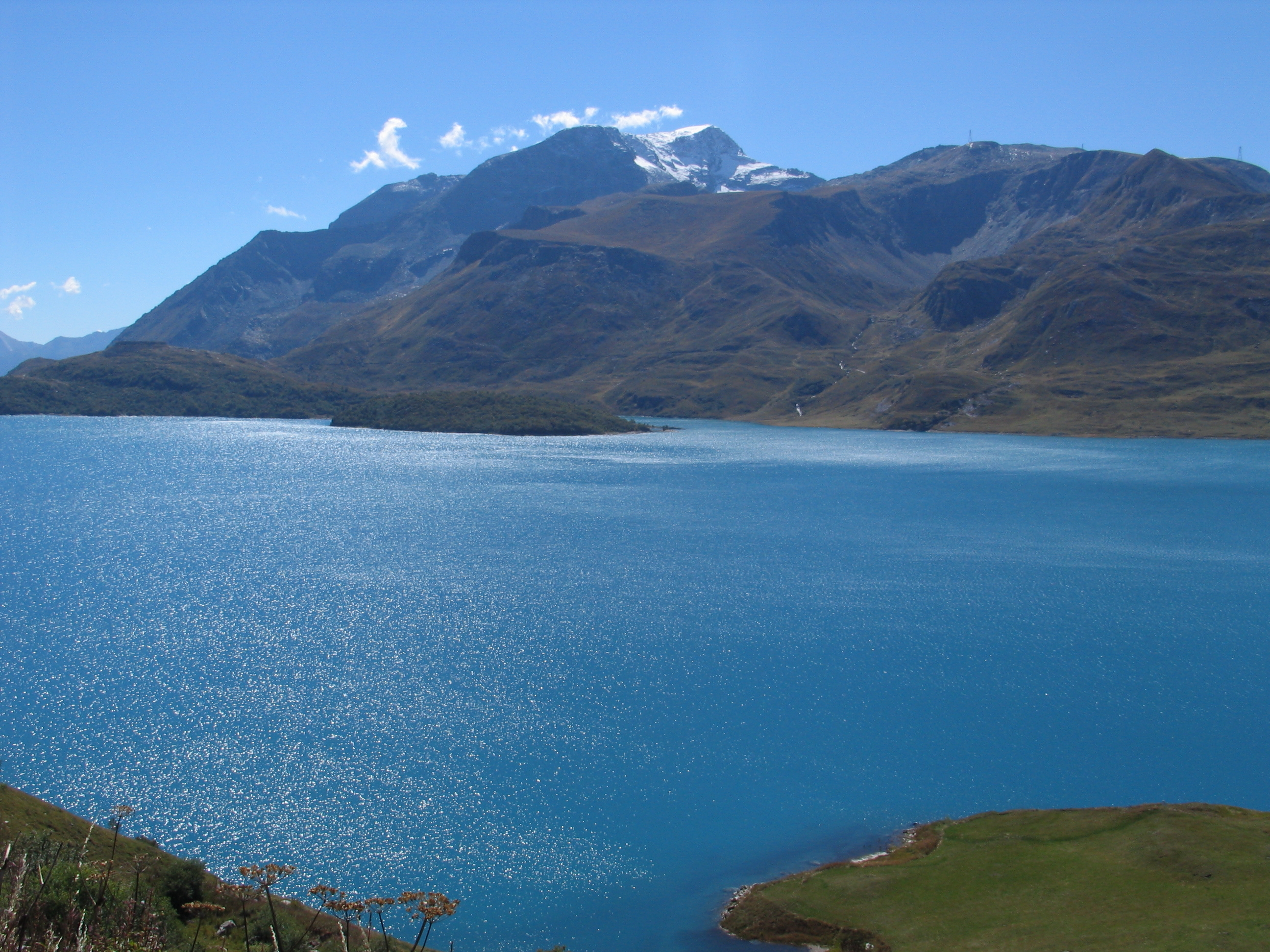
- Lake at the pass

- Location within Alps
- Elevation: 2,085 m (6,841 ft)
- Traversed by: Route nationale 6

Third Approach
- Location: Savoie, France
- Range: Graian Alps/Cottian Alps
- Coordinates: 45°15′37″N 06°54′03″E

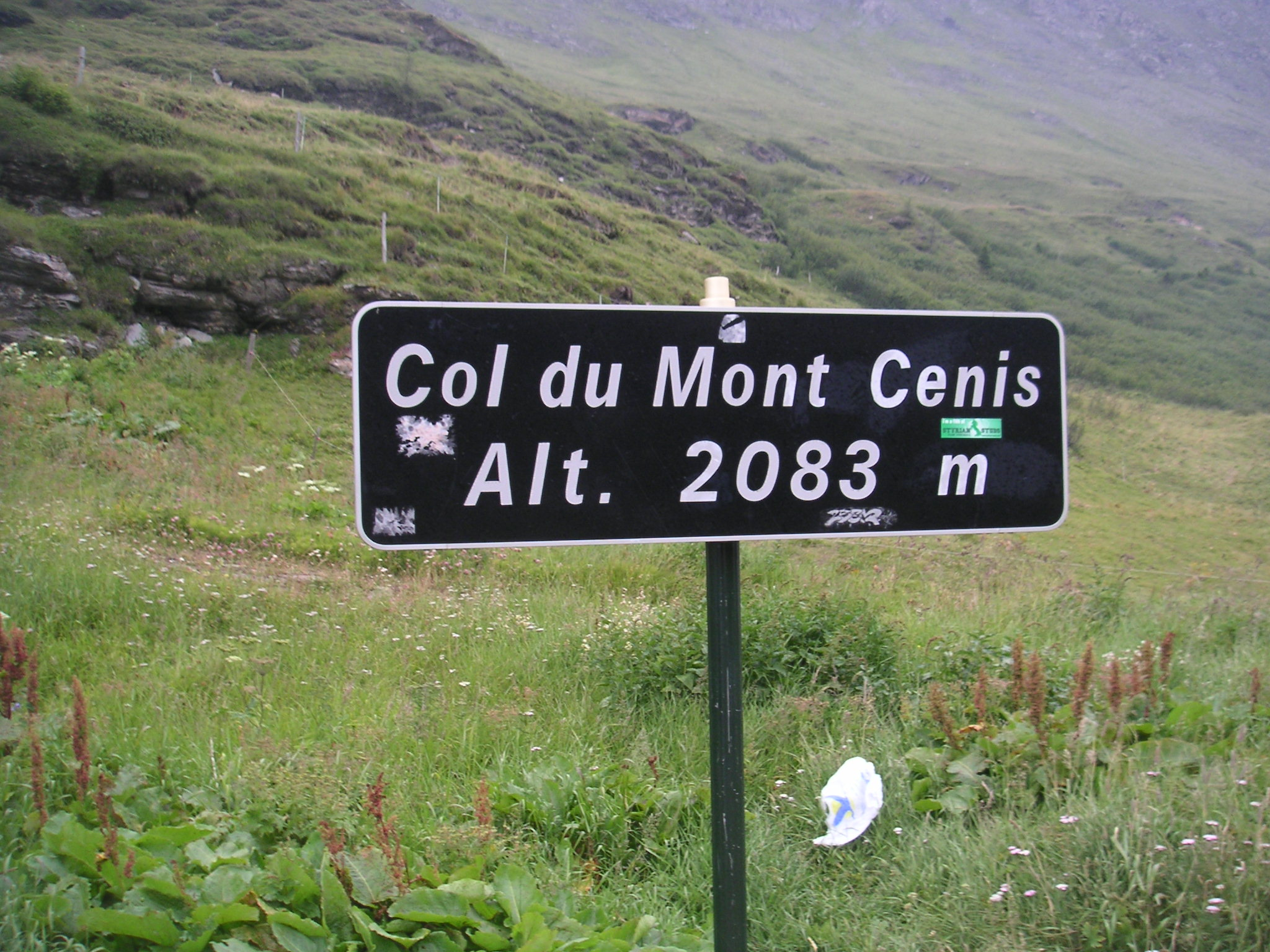
The sign marking the pass

Mont Cenis (French pronunciation: [mɔ̃ s(ə)ni]; Italian: Moncenisio, pronounced [montʃeˈnizjo]) is a massif in Savoie, France. It has an elevation of 3,612 m (11,850 ft) at Pointe de Ronce and a pass at an elevation of 2,085 m (6,841 ft); it forms the limit between the Cottian and Graian Alps.

== Etymology ==
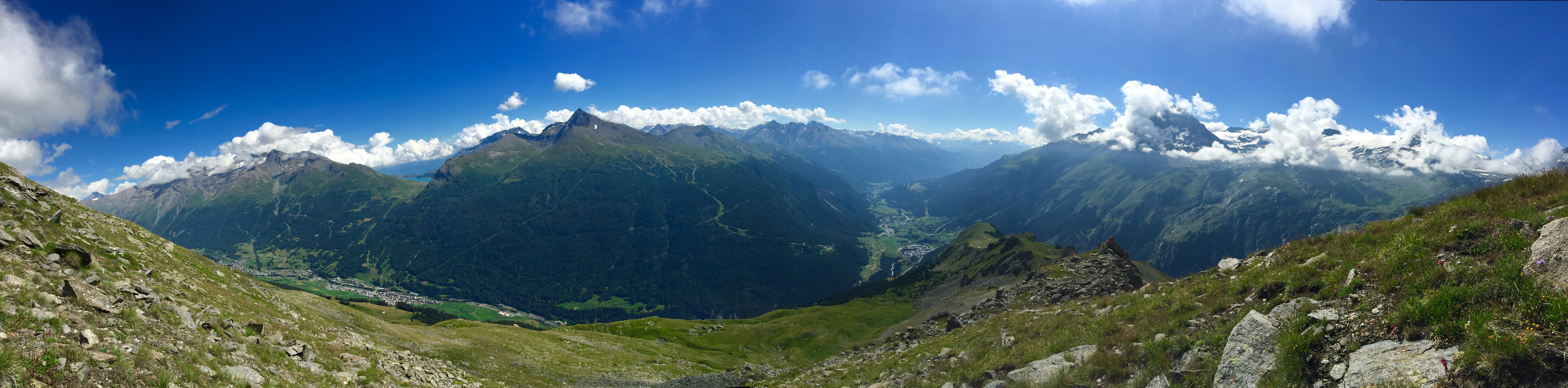
The col du Mont-Cenis at the center left of the picture gives access to a large lake, and further away to the Italian peninsula 10 kilometres beyond the pass.

The term "Mont Cenis" could be derived from mont des cendres ("mountain of ashes"). According to tradition, following a forest fire, a great quantity of ashes accumulated on the ground, thus the name. The path of ashes was found during the building work of the route.

== Geography ==
The pass connects Val-Cenis in France in the northwest with the Susa Valley in Italy in the southeast. Thence, the Susa Valley—the valley of the Dora Riparia—is followed to Turin (103.8 kilometres (64.5 mi) from Modane). The carriage road mounts the Arc valley for 25.7 kilometres (16.0 mi) from Modane to Lanslebourg, whence it is 12.9 kilometres (8.0 mi) to the hospice, a little way beyond the summit of the pass. The descent lies through the Cenis Valley to Susa (49.9 kilometres (31.0 mi) from Modane), where the road joins the railway.

To the southwest of the Mont Cenis is the Little Mont Cenis (2,184.2 metres; 7,166 ft), which leads from the summit plateau (in Italy) of the main pass to the Etache valley on the French slope and so to Bramans in the Arc valley.

The pass runs parallel to the Fréjus Rail Tunnel. This (highest point 1,295 metres/4,249 ft) is really 27.4 kilometres (17.0 mi) southwest of the pass, below the Col du Fréjus. From Chambéry, the line runs up the Isère valley, but soon bears through that of the Arc or the Maurienne past Saint-Jean-de-Maurienne to Modane (98.2 kilometres (61.0 mi) from Chambéry). The tunnel is 13 km in length, and leads to Bardonecchia, some way below which, at Oulx the line joins the road from the Col de Montgenèvre.

== History ==
In the Middle Ages, pilgrims passing through Moncenisio and Susa Valley came to Turin along a road called the Via Francigena, with a final destination of Rome. In 1414, Niccolò III d'Este, Marquis of Ferrara, travelled on this route returning from Paris having met Charles VI, and described the Col du Mont Cenis as having "a good ascent and bad descent". This pass was crossed in 1689 by the Vaudois, and is believed by some authors to have been the pass used by Hannibal to cross the Alps.

As an Alpine pass, Mont Cenis featured in several historical incidents. One example is the descent of Constantine I to Italy, to fight against Maxentius. It was the site of a military victory by the French Army of the Alps, led by General-in-Chief Alex Dumas over Piedmontese forces in April 1794, a victory that enabled the French Army of Italy to invade and conquer the Italian peninsula. It was the principal route for crossing the Alps between France and Italy until the 19th century. It was also used as the main passage by which Charlemagne crossed with his army to invade Lombardy in 773, and later by Napoleon I.

Mont Cenis was one of the most-used Alpine passes from the Middle Ages to the nineteenth century. The pass was part of the border between the two countries from the annexation of Savoy to the Second French Empire in 1861 until the 1947 Treaty of Paris, but is now located completely in France. The treaty allowed Savoy to retrieve its historical and political boundaries. It has historically been part of Route nationale 6.

A road over the pass was built between 1802 and 1805 by Napoleon to improve military connections. By 1810, it was the most-travelled road between France and Italy, as Strasbourg was closed to silk trade traffic from Vienna, leading to Lyon becoming a major trade centre instead. The Mont Cenis Pass Railway was opened alongside the road in 1868, but was dismantled in 1871, on the opening of the Fréjus Rail Tunnel. It was the first-ever railway based on the Fell mountain railway system and was worked by English engine-drivers. The Fréjus Rail Tunnel acquired the alternative, and geographically incorrect, name of Mont Cenis Tunnel because the traffic which formerly used the Mont Cenis Pass was transferred to it.

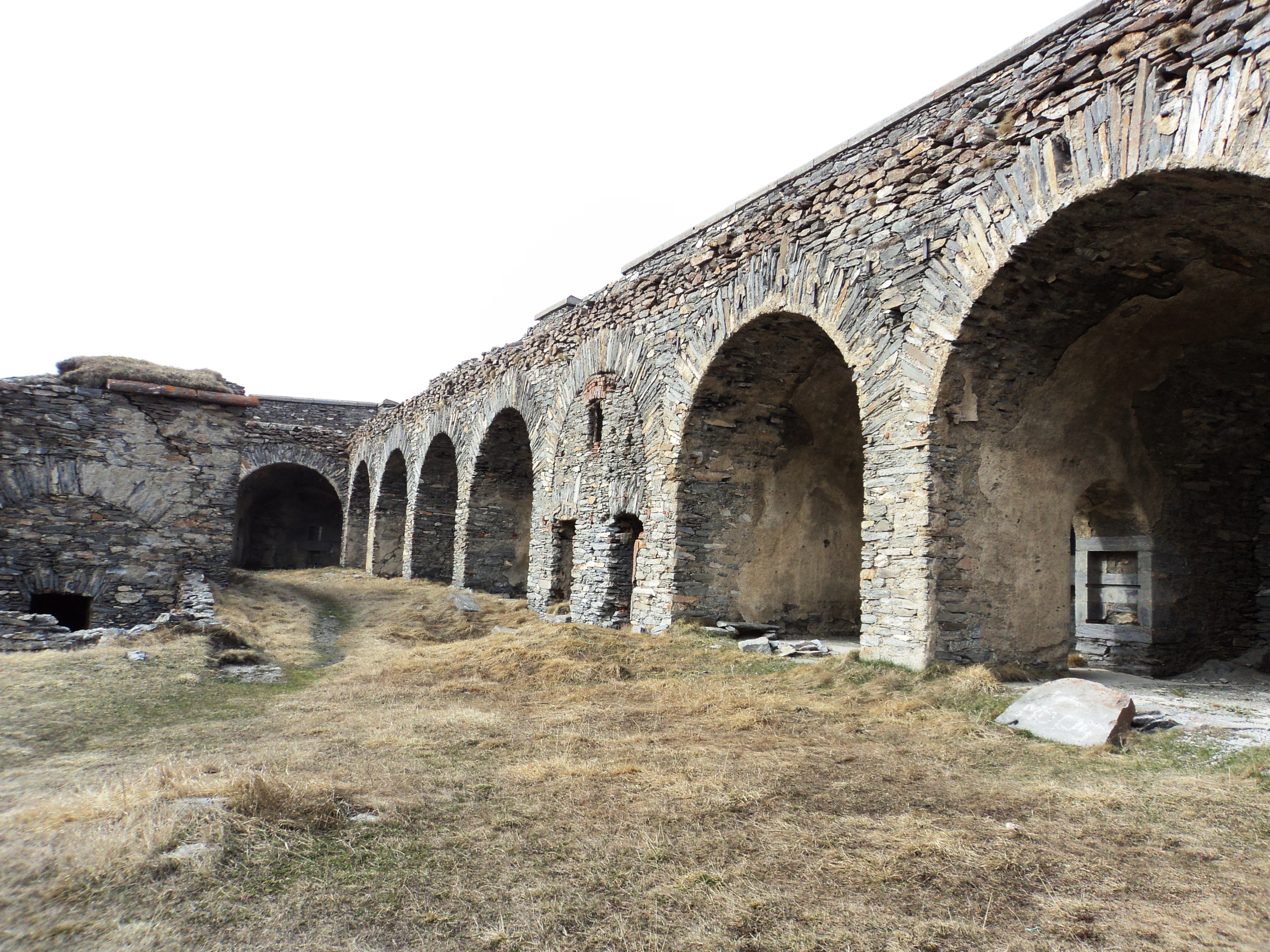
Remains of Forte Varisello.

When the Kingdom of Sardinia-Piedmont ceded Savoy to France in 1860, the Mont Cenis became a frontier pass, and consequently, a part of Savoy was left on the Italian side. It was, therefore, highly fortified as a protection against an invasion of the Val di Susa route towards Turin. In 1874–1880, the Italian Regio Esercito built three stone forts: Fort Cassa, Fort Varisello, and Fort Roncia, supported by several batteries and fortifications, such as those at the top of Mont Malamot. Two further armored batteries, La Court and Paradiso, were added in the early 20th century, while the Fascist government built here part of its underground Alpine Wall. All these fortifications are now in French territory after the boundaries revision in 1947, allowing Savoy to get its historical territory back.

The Lac Du Mont Cenis is an artificial dam that was constructed in 1921 on top of the original road and border crossing. It feeds two hydroelectric power plants. The lake is occasionally drained for maintenance.

== Cycling ==
The pass of Mont Cenis has been crossed five times in the Tour de France. It has been classified hors-catégorie (yielding the highest number of points in the King-of-the-Mountains classification) since 1999.

Year	Stage	Category	Start	Finish	Leader at the summit
1949	17	2	Briançon	Aoste	Giuseppe Tacca (FRA)
1956	18	1	Turin	Grenoble	Federico Bahamontes (ESP)
1961	10	1	Grenoble	Turin	Emmanuel Busto (FRA)
1992	13	1	Saint Gervais Mont Blanc	Sestriere	Claudio Chiappucci (ITA)
1999	10	HC	Sestriere	Alpe d'Huez	Dimitri Konyshev (RUS)

In the 2013 Giro d'Italia, the pass was included in the 15th stage on May 19, 2013.

== Climate ==
Mont Cenis has a subarctic climate (Köppen climate classification Dfc). Due to the elevation of the top of the mountain at 2,030 m (6,660 ft), the temperature here is significantly lower than that of the plains. Even the warmest months of July and August, the temperature rarely rises above 25 °C (77 °F), and often falls below −20 °C (−4 °F) in severe winter. Around the world, there are also Zoige and Litang areas with similar climatic characteristics here. The average annual temperature in Mont Cenis is 2.6 °C (36.7 °F). The average annual rainfall is 753.6 mm (29.67 in), with May as the wettest month. The temperatures are highest on average in July, at around 11.3 °C (52.3 °F), and lowest in February, at around −4.5 °C (23.9 °F). The highest temperature ever recorded in Mont Cenis was 27.6 °C (81.7 °F) on 26 June 2019; the coldest temperature ever recorded was −24.7 °C (−12.5 °F) on 4 February 2012.

Climate data for Mont Cenis (1981−2010 normals, extremes 1992−present)
Month	Jan	Feb	Mar	Apr	May	Jun	Jul	Aug	Sep	Oct	Nov	Dec	Year
Record high °C (°F)	13.1 (55.6)	14.2 (57.6)	14.0 (57.2)	15.8 (60.4)	22.4 (72.3)	27.6 (81.7)	26.7 (80.1)	24.8 (76.6)	24.0 (75.2)	20.1 (68.2)	17.0 (62.6)	14.2 (57.6)	27.6 (81.7)
Mean daily maximum °C (°F)	−1.4 (29.5)	−1.2 (29.8)	1.1 (34.0)	3.0 (37.4)	8.9 (48.0)	13.5 (56.3)	15.7 (60.3)	15.1 (59.2)	10.5 (50.9)	6.9 (44.4)	1.2 (34.2)	−1.3 (29.7)	6.0 (42.8)
Daily mean °C (°F)	−4.5 (23.9)	−4.6 (23.7)	−2.3 (27.9)	0.0 (32.0)	5.4 (41.7)	9.3 (48.7)	11.3 (52.3)	11.1 (52.0)	7.1 (44.8)	3.8 (38.8)	−1.6 (29.1)	−4.1 (24.6)	2.6 (36.7)
Mean daily minimum °C (°F)	−7.5 (18.5)	−7.9 (17.8)	−5.6 (21.9)	−2.9 (26.8)	1.9 (35.4)	5.2 (41.4)	7.0 (44.6)	7.0 (44.6)	3.6 (38.5)	0.7 (33.3)	−4.3 (24.3)	−7.0 (19.4)	−0.8 (30.6)
Record low °C (°F)	−21.7 (−7.1)	−24.7 (−12.5)	−21.0 (−5.8)	−12.9 (8.8)	−8.7 (16.3)	−5.6 (21.9)	−1.2 (29.8)	−1.1 (30.0)	−6.1 (21.0)	−11.4 (11.5)	−17.4 (0.7)	−20.5 (−4.9)	−24.7 (−12.5)
Average precipitation mm (inches)	34.1 (1.34)	18.0 (0.71)	34.8 (1.37)	58.3 (2.30)	137.9 (5.43)	94.1 (3.70)	56.5 (2.22)	71.3 (2.81)	96.6 (3.80)	60.9 (2.40)	57.6 (2.27)	33.5 (1.32)	753.6 (29.67)
Average precipitation days (≥ 1.0 mm)	5.9	4.5	6.9	8.5	12.6	10.5	8.4	9.9	8.9	7.7	8.4	6.6	98.7
Source: Météo-France

== Points of interest ==
- Jardin botanique de Mont Cenis, an alpine botanical garden

== See also ==
- List of highest paved roads in Europe
- List of mountain passes
