= Camillo Benso, Count of Cavour =

Italian statesman and politician

Signore The Count of Cavour SOMHA, OSML, COS
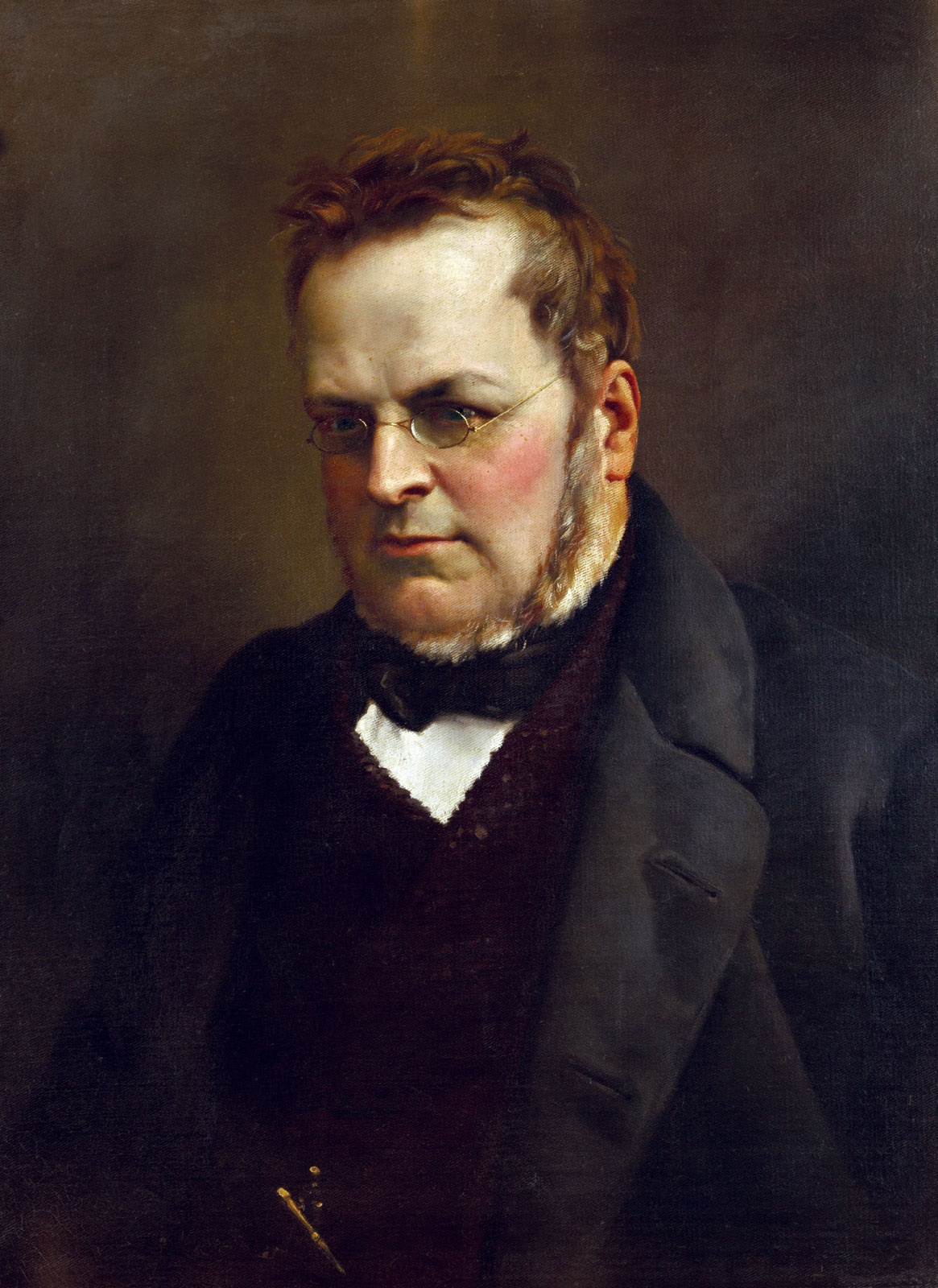
- Portrait by Antonio Ciseri, 1861

1st Prime Minister of Italy
- In office 23 March 1861 – 6 June 1861
- Monarch: Victor Emmanuel II
- Preceded by: himself as Prime Minister of the Kingdom of Sardinia
- Succeeded by: Bettino Ricasoli

Prime Minister of the Kingdom of Sardinia
- In office 21 January 1860 – 23 March 1861
- Monarch: Victor Emmanuel II
- Preceded by: Alfonso Ferrero La Marmora
- Succeeded by: himself as Prime Minister of Italy
- In office 4 November 1852 – 19 July 1859
- Monarch: Victor Emmanuel II
- Preceded by: Massimo D'Azeglio
- Succeeded by: Alfonso Ferrero La Marmora

Minister of Finances
- In office 19 April 1851 – 11 May 1852
- Monarch: Victor Emmanuel II
- Prime Minister: Massimo D'Azeglio
- Preceded by: Giovanni Nigra
- Succeeded by: Luigi Cibrario

Minister of Agriculture and Trade
- In office 11 October 1850 – 11 May 1852
- Monarch: Victor Emmanuel II
- Prime Minister: Massimo D'Azeglio
- Preceded by: Pietro De Rossi di Santarosa
- Succeeded by: Giuseppe Natoli (1861)

Member of the Chamber of Deputies
- In office 30 June 1848 – 17 March 1861
- Constituency: Turin

Personal details
- Born: Camillo Paolo Filippo Giulio Benso; 10 August 1810 Turin, First French Empire
- Died: 6 June 1861 (aged 50) Turin, Kingdom of Italy
- Party: Historical Right

Camillo Paolo Filippo Giulio Benso, Count of Cavour, Isolabella and Leri (Italian: [kaˈmillo ˈbɛnso]; 10 August 1810 – 6 June 1861), generally known as the Count of Cavour (/kəˈvʊər/ kə-VOOR; Italian: Conte di Cavour [ˈkonte di kaˈvur]) or simply Cavour, was an Italian politician, statesman, businessman, economist, and noble, and a leading figure in the movement towards Italian unification. He was one of the leaders of the Historical Right and Prime Minister of the Kingdom of Sardinia from 1852, a position he maintained (except for a six-month resignation) until his death, throughout the Second Italian War of Independence and Giuseppe Garibaldi's campaigns to unite Italy. After the declaration of a united Kingdom of Italy, Cavour took office as the first Prime Minister of Italy; he died after only three months in office and did not live to see the Roman Question solved through the complete unification of the country after the Capture of Rome in 1870.

Cavour put forth several economic reforms in his native region of Piedmont, at that time part of the Kingdom of Sardinia, in his earlier years and founded the political newspaper Il Risorgimento. After being elected to the Chamber of Deputies, he quickly rose in rank through the Piedmontese government, coming to dominate the Chamber of Deputies through a union of centre-left and centre-right politicians. After a large rail system expansion program, Cavour became prime minister in 1852. As prime minister, Cavour successfully negotiated Piedmont's way through the Crimean War, the Second Italian War of Independence, and Garibaldi's Expedition of the Thousand, managing to manoeuvre Piedmont diplomatically to become a new great power in Europe, controlling a nearly united Italy that was five times as large as Piedmont had been before he came to power.

English historian Denis Mack Smith says Cavour was the most successful parliamentarian in Italian history, but he was not especially democratic. Cavour was often dictatorial, ignored his ministerial colleagues and parliament, and interfered in parliamentary elections. He also practised trasformismo and other policies which were carried over into post-Risorgimento Italy.

== Biography ==
=== Early life ===
Cavour was born in Turin during Napoleonic rule, into a family which had acquired estates during the French occupation. He was the second of two sons of Michele Giuseppe Francesco Antonio Benso, 4th Marquess of Cavour and Count of Isolabella and Leri, Lord of Corveglia, Dusino, Mondonio, Ottiglio and Ponticelli, Co-Lord of Castagnole, Cellarengo and Menabi, Cereaglio, Chieri, San Salvatore Monferrato, Santena and Valfenera, 1st Baron of the French Empire (1781–1850), and his wife (1805) Adélaïde (Adèle) Suzanne, Marchioness of Sellon (1780–1846), herself of French origin. His godparents were Napoleon's sister Pauline, and her husband, Prince Camillo Borghese, after whom Cavour was named.

Cavour and his older brother Gustavo were initially educated at home. He was sent to the Turin Military Academy when he was only ten years old. In July 1824 he was named a page to Charles Albert, the King of Piedmont (1831–1849). Cavour frequently ran afoul of the authorities in the academy, as he was too headstrong to deal with the rigid military discipline. He was once forced to live three days on bread and water because he had been caught with books that the academy had banned. He was found to be apt at the mathematical disciplines, and was therefore enlisted in the Engineer Corps in the Royal Sardinian Army in 1827. While in the army, he studied the English language as well as the works of Jeremy Bentham and Benjamin Constant, developing liberal tendencies which made him suspect to police forces at the time. He resigned his commission in the army in November 1831, both because of boredom with military life and because of his dislike of the reactionary policies of King Charles Albert. He administered the family estate at Grinzane, some forty kilometres outside the capital, serving as mayor there from 1832 to the revolutionary upheaval of 1848.

Coat of arms of the Count of Cavour: "Argent on a chief gules three scallop shells or."

Cavour then lived for a time in Switzerland, with his relatives in Geneva. He then travelled to Paris where he was impressed by parliamentary debates, especially those of François Guizot and Adolphe Thiers, confirming his devotion to a political career. He next went to London, where he was much more disappointed by British politics, and toured the country, visiting Oxford, Liverpool, Birmingham, Chester, Nottingham, and Manchester. A quick tour through the Netherlands, Germany, and Switzerland (the German part and the Lake Geneva area) eventually landed him back in Turin.

Cavour believed that economic progress had to precede political change, and stressed the advantages of railroad construction in the peninsula. He was a strong supporter of transportation by steam engine, sponsoring the building of many railroads and canals. Between 1838 and 1842 Cavour began several initiatives in attempts to solve economic problems in his area. He experimented with different agricultural techniques on his estate, such as growing sugar beets, and was one of the first Italian landowners to use chemical fertilizers. He also founded the Piedmontese Agricultural Society. In his spare time, he again travelled extensively, mostly in France and the United Kingdom.

=== Early political career ===
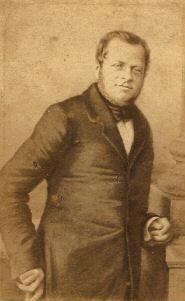
An early portrait of Cavour

The first apparently liberal moves of Pope Pius IX and the Revolutions of 1848 spawned a new movement of Italian liberalism, allowing Cavour to enter the political arena, no longer in fear of the police. He then gave a speech in front of numerous journalists in favour of a constitution for Piedmont, which was eventually granted. Cavour, unlike several other political thinkers, was not at first offered a position in the new Chamber of Deputies, as he was still a somewhat suspicious character to the nation.

Cavour never planned for the establishment of a united country, and even later during his premiership, his objective was to expand Piedmont with the annexation of Lombardy and Venetia, rather than a unified Italy. For example, during the conservative period, he gained a reputation as a non-revolutionary progressive. He was a poor public speaker. Cavour then lost the next election, while the Piedmontese army was destroyed at the Battle of Novara, leading Charles Albert to abdicate, passing the throne to his son, Victor Emmanuel II.

Cavour was then brought back into Parliament by the voters, where he was much more successful. His knowledge of European markets and modern economics earned him the positions of Minister of Agriculture, Minister of Commerce, and Minister of the Navy in 1850. Cavour soon came to dominate the cabinet of Prime Minister Massimo d'Azeglio. Cavour united the Right Center and the Left Center in the chamber to show dominance there as well. In 1851, Cavour gained a Cabinet promotion to Minister of Finance by working against his colleague from inside the Cabinet in a somewhat disreputable takeover, although this was to Piedmont's advantage because of his many economic reforms. It allowed Cavour to begin his railway expansion program, giving Piedmont 800 kilometres of track by the year 1860, one-third of the railways in Italy at the time. He took the lead in legislation weakening the powers of the Church to own land, control the schools and supervise marriage laws. When the bishops protested, they were punished or exiled, making Cavour the hero of liberal anticlerical elements across Italy.

=== Prime Minister of Piedmont–Sardinia ===
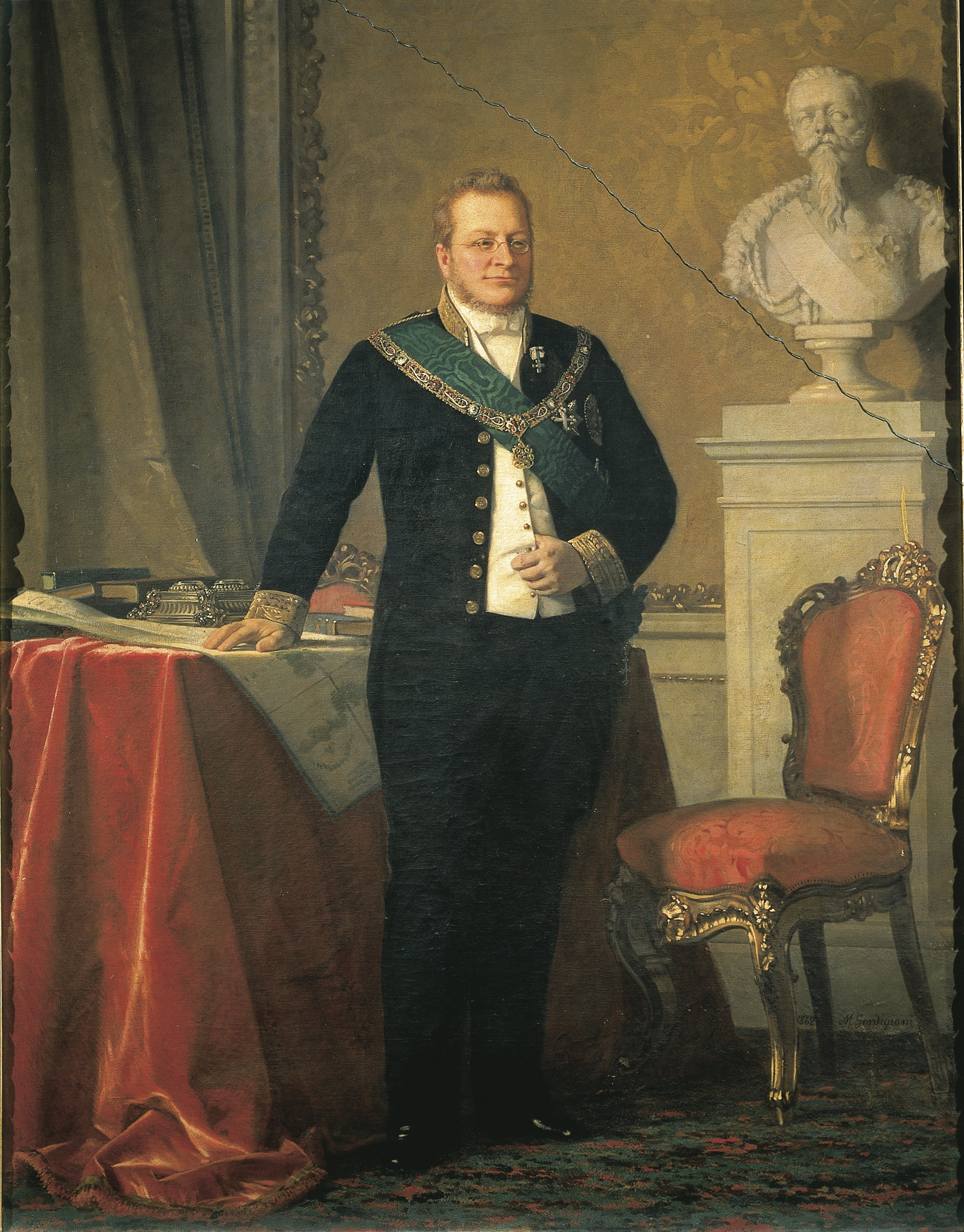
Official portrait of Cavour in 1852

Cavour formed a coalition with Urbano Rattazzi known as the Connubio ("marriage"), uniting the moderate men of the Right and of the Left, and brought about the fall of the d'Azeglio cabinet in November 1852. The King reluctantly accepted Cavour as prime minister, the most conservative possible choice, but their relationship was never an easy one.

Cavour was generally liberal and believed in free trade, freedom of opinion (but not freedom to disagree with him - see above, his persecution of religious opposition), and secular rule, but he was an enemy of republicans and revolutionaries, whom he feared as disorganized radicals who would upset the social order. Cavour dominated debate in Parliament but is criticized for the controversial methods he used while Prime Minister, including excessive use of emergency powers, employing friends, bribing some newspapers while suppressing others, and rigging elections, though these were fairly common practices for the time. The national debt soared by a factor of six because of his heavy spending on modernizing projects, especially railways, and building up the army and the Royal Sardinian Navy. When he became Prime Minister, Piedmont had just suffered a major defeat by Austria; by the time Cavour died, Victor Emmanuel II ruled a state five times as large, which dominated Italy and ranked among Europe's great powers.

The allied powers of Britain and France asked Piedmont to enter the Crimean War, partially to encourage Austria to enter, which it would not do unless it was certain that Piedmontese troops were not available to attack Austrian positions in Italy. Cavour, who hoped that the allies would support Piedmont's expansion in Italy, agreed as soon as his colleagues' support would allow and entered the war on 10 January 1855. This was too late to truly distinguish themselves militarily, but the 18,000-man contingent earned Piedmont a position at the Congress of Paris that ended the war.

In January 1858, the Italian Felice Orsini's attempted assassination of Napoleon III paradoxically opened an avenue of diplomacy between France and Piedmont. While in jail awaiting trial, Orsini wrote a public letter to the Emperor of the French, ending with, "Remember that, so long as Italy is not independent, the peace of Europe and Your Majesty is but an empty dream... Set my country free, and the blessings of twenty-five million people will follow you everywhere and forever." Orsini was still executed, but Napoleon III began to explore the possibility of a joint operation with Piedmont against Austria. Cavour and Napoleon met in July 1858 at Plombières-les-Bains, and the two agreed that Piedmont would attempt to provoke war with the Duchy of Modena, obliging Austria to enter, and France would then aid Piedmont. In return, Cavour reluctantly agreed to cede Savoy (the seat of the Piedmontese royal family) and the County of Nice to France, and also arranged a royal marriage between Princess Maria Clotilde of Savoy and Prince Napoléon-Jérôme Bonaparte, surprisingly without Victor Emmanuel's consent. In the same year, Cavour sent his cousin, the famous beauty, photographic artist, and secret agent Virginia Oldoïni, to further the interests of Italian unification with the emperor by whatever means possible, and by all accounts she succeeded, famously becoming the mistress of Napoleon.

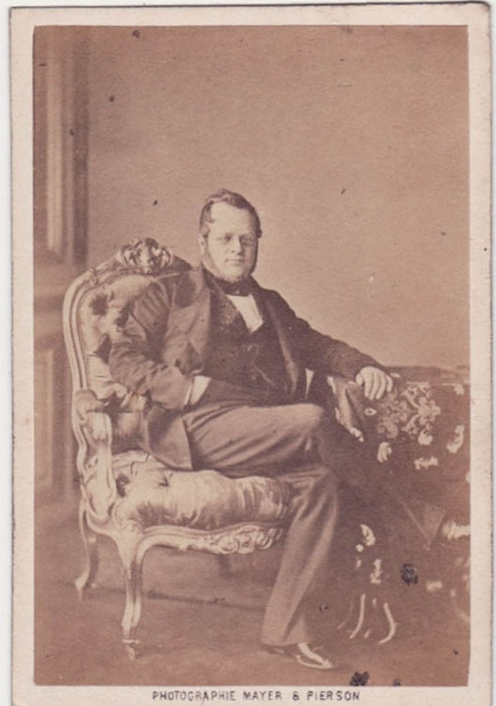
Cavour as Prime Minister of Sardinia in the 1850s

Both France and Piedmont began to prepare for war, but diplomatic support diminished rapidly. Napoleon III quickly soured on the plot, and Britain, Prussia, and Russia proposed an international congress, with one likely goal the disarmament of Piedmont. Piedmont was saved by Austria's sending an ultimatum on 23 April, demanding that Piedmont disarm itself, thus casting Austria as an aggressor. France mobilised and slowly began to enter Italy, but Piedmont needed to defend itself for a short period. Fortunately, rainstorms and Austrian indecision under Ferenc Gyulay gave time for France to arrive in force.

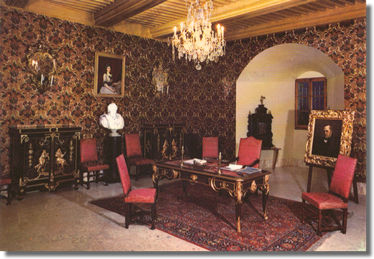
Cavour's desk in the Château de Thorens, Savoy

The battles of Magenta and Solferino left Franco-Piedmontese forces in control of Lombardy, but the Austrians remained confident of defending their "fortress quadrilateral" area, with four fortresses in Verona, Legnago, Peschiera, and Mantua. These defences, the horrors of the Battle of Solferino, the possibility of Prussian entry into the war, and the potential for an over-strong Piedmontese state convinced Napoleon to sign a separate peace with Austria in the Armistice of Villafranca on 11 July 1859, ending the Second Italian War of Independence. Victor Emmanuel accepted the peace, but Cavour was so infuriated after reading the terms of the treaty that he tendered his resignation. He soon regained his optimism, however, as several of the terms, such as the restoration to power of the rulers of Tuscany and Modena, and the establishment of an Italian Confederation including Austria, were not actually carried out.

Alfonso Ferrero La Marmora succeeded to Cavour's post and insisted on following the treaty terms, even sending a letter to Tuscany asking that they restore their Grand Duke. Bettino Ricasoli, virtual dictator of Tuscany at the time, wrote about this appeal to his brother, saying: "Tell General La Marmora that I have torn his letter into a thousand pieces." France continued direct talks with Piedmont on the destiny of the central Italian states, all of whose provisional governments supported unification with Piedmont but were restrained by the treaty, which called for the restoration of their old rulers.

Cavour had retired to his estate at Leri, out of politics but concerned about the King's alliance with Garibaldi's revolutionaries and his desire to renew the war with Austria without allied support. When the weak La Marmora cabinet resigned, Victor Emmanuel was reluctant to have Cavour as premier again due both to their quarrel over the Armistice of Villafranca and Cavour's success in preventing the king from marrying his mistress after the queen's death. But Cavour was sent for on 20 January 1860.

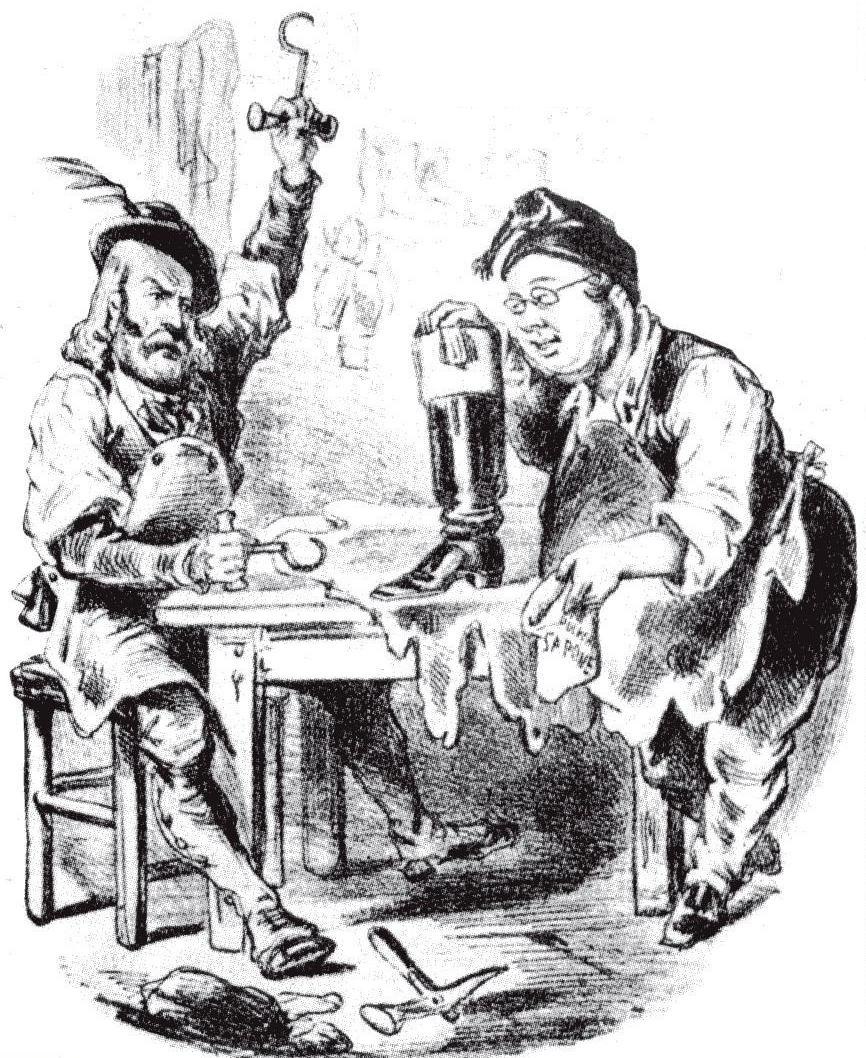
Giuseppe Garibaldi and Cavour making Italy in a satirical cartoon of 1861; the boot is a well-known reference to the shape of the Italian Peninsula

Cavour agreed with Napoleon to cede Savoy and Nice to France, in order to annex Tuscany and Emilia to Piedmont. Plebiscites were arranged with huge majorities in all these provinces to approve the changes. Cavour managed to convince most that uniting Italy would make up for these territorial losses. With this, the first stage of unification was completed. It was now up to Garibaldi to overthrow the Bourbon Kingdom of the Two Sicilies and bring southern Italy into Piedmont's control.

Garibaldi was furious that his birthplace, Nice, had been ceded to France, and wished to recapture the city, but a popular insurrection in Palermo on 4 April 1860 diverted him southward. He requested a brigade of Piedmontese to take Sicily, but Cavour refused. So instead, Garibaldi raised a force of a thousand (I Mille) redshirt volunteers. They landed at Marsala in Sicily on 11 May and won the battles of Calatafimi and Milazzo, gaining control of Sicily. Cavour attempted to annex Sicily to Piedmont, but Garibaldi and his comrade Francesco Crispi would not allow it.

Cavour persuaded Victor Emmanuel to write a letter to Garibaldi, requesting that he not invade the mainland; the letter was indeed sent, but the King secretly wished Garibaldi to invade. He wrote another letter asking him to go ahead, but this was apparently never sent. Cavour meanwhile attempted to stir up a liberal revolution in Naples, but the populace was unreceptive. Garibaldi invaded, attempting to reach Naples quickly before Cavour found a way to stop him. On 7 September he entered Naples, at that time the largest city in Italy, and unilaterally declared Victor Emmanuel the King of Italy. Garibaldi was now military dictator of southern Italy and Sicily, and he imposed the Piedmontese constitution but publicly demanded that Cavour be removed, which alienated him slightly from Victor Emmanuel.

Garibaldi was unwilling to stop at this point, and planned an immediate invasion of the Papal States. Cavour feared France in that case would declare war to defend the Pope and successfully stopped Garibaldi from initiating his attack. Garibaldi had been weakened by the Battle of the Volturno, so Cavour quickly invaded the Papal regions of Umbria and Marche. This linked the territories conquered by Piedmont with those taken by Garibaldi. The King met with Garibaldi, who handed over control of southern Italy and Sicily, thus uniting Italy.

The relationship between Cavour and Garibaldi was always fractious: Cavour likened Garibaldi to "a savage" while Garibaldi memorably called Cavour "a low intriguer".

=== Prime Minister of Italy ===
In 1861, Victor Emmanuel II declared the Kingdom of Italy, making Cavour Prime Minister of Italy. Cavour had many difficult issues to consider, including how to create a national military, which legal institutions should be retained in what locations, and especially the future of Rome. Most Italians thought Rome must be the capital of a united Italy, but this conflicted with the temporal power of the Pope and also the independence of the Church. Cavour believed that Rome should remain the seat of "a free church in a free state", which would maintain its independence but give up temporal power. These issues would become known as the "Roman Question". Venetia, still Austrian, was also a problem. Cavour recognized that Venice must be an integral part of Italy but refused to take a stance on how to achieve it, saying "Will the deliverance of Venice come by arms or diplomacy? I do not know. It is the secret of Providence." A motion approving of his foreign policy passed by a huge majority, basically only opposed by left-wing and right-wing extremist groups.

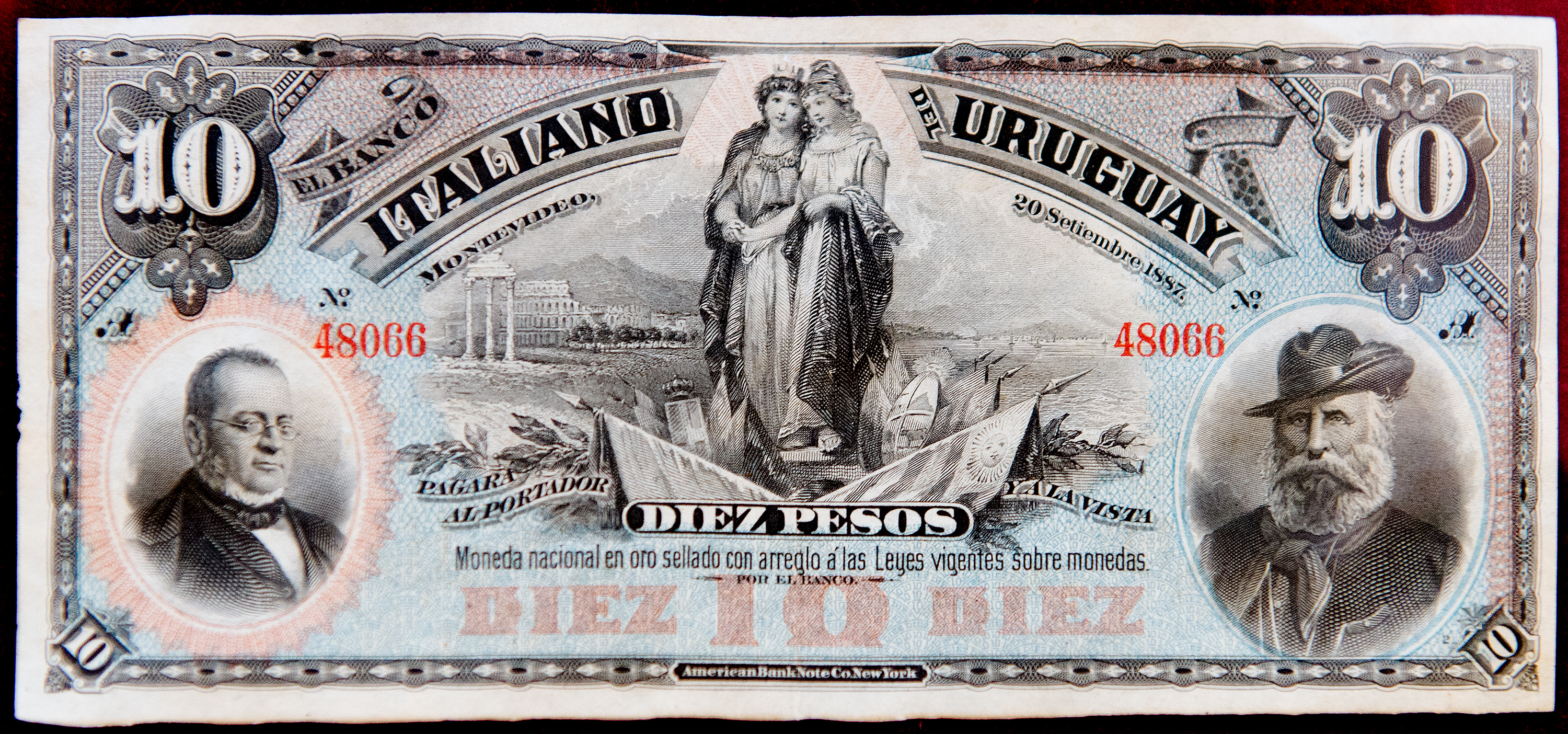
Ten pesos banknote, printed in Uruguay in 1887, with the image of Cavour and Garibaldi

Creating Italy was no easy task, but ruling it proved a worse strain on the Prime Minister. In 1861, at the peak of his career, months of long days coupled with insomnia and constant worry took their toll on Cavour. He fell ill, presumably of malaria, and to make matters worse insisted upon being bled. His regular doctor would have refused, but he was not available; so Cavour was bled several times until it was nearly impossible to draw any blood from him. He was buried in Santena, near Turin.

After his death, Italy would gain Venice in 1866 in the course of the Third Italian War of Independence, connected to the Austro-Prussian War. The Capture of Rome completed the unification of Italy (aside from Trentino and Trieste) in 1870.

== Legacy ==
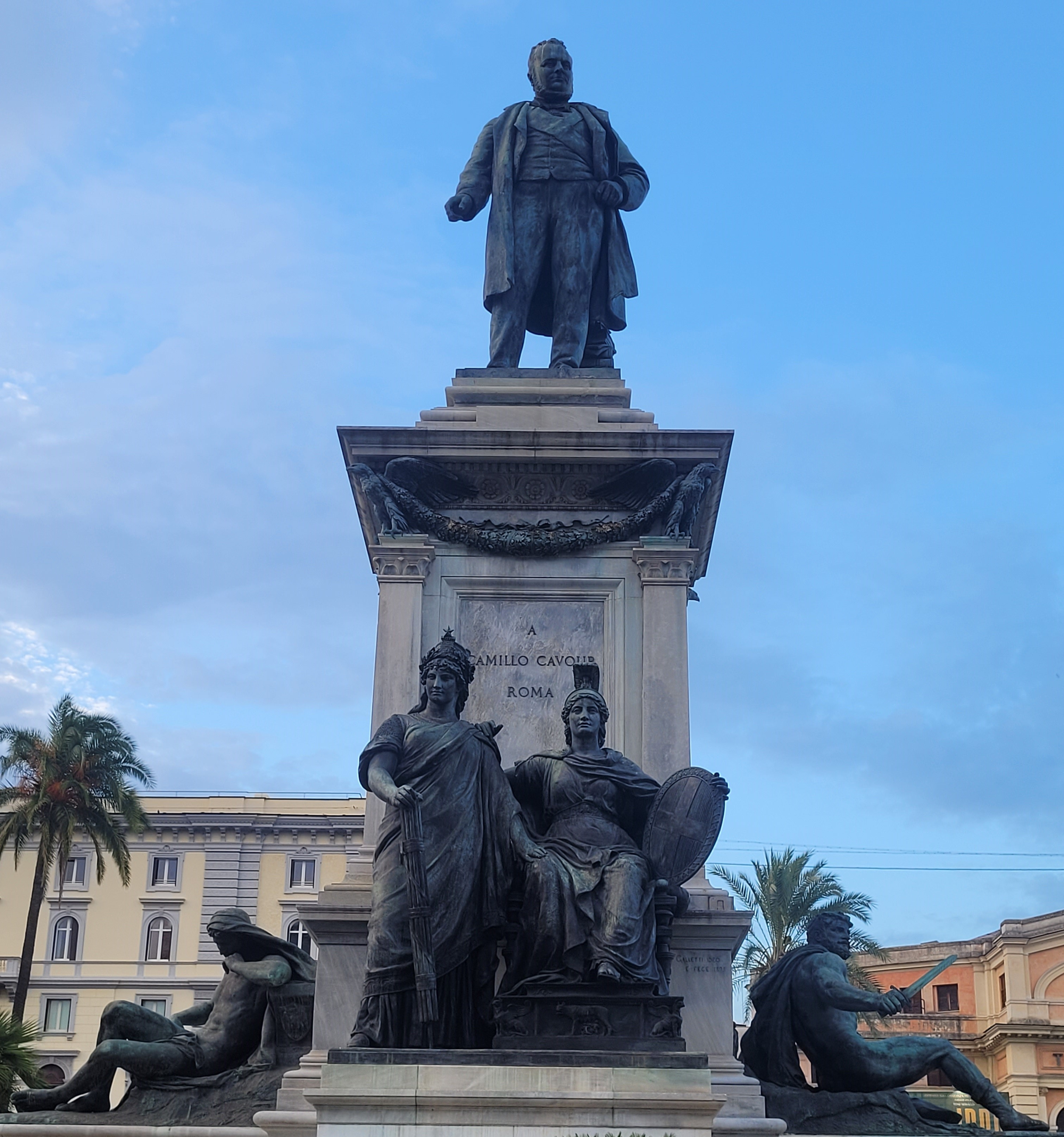
Monument of Cavour in Rome

Today, many Italian cities, including Turin, Trieste, Rome, Florence, and Naples, have important streets, squares, piazzas, and metro stations named after Cavour, as well as Mazzini and Garibaldi. The clipper ship, Camille Cavour, the battleship Conte di Cavour, which fought both in World War I and World War II, and the new Marina Militare aircraft carrier Cavour is also named in his honour.

In 1865, the Collegio dei Nobili, the oldest high school in Turin (founded 1568), and among the oldest and most prominent ones in Italy, was renamed the Liceo Ginnasio statale "Camillo Benso di Cavour" (Liceo classico Cavour).

== See also ==
- History of Italy
- Ministers of the Interior of the Kingdom of Sardinia

Political offices
| Preceded by Massimo d'Azeglio | Prime Minister of Piedmont-Sardinia; 1852–1859 | Succeeded by Alfonso Ferrero La Marmora |
| Preceded by Alfonso Ferrero La Marmora | Prime Minister of Piedmont-Sardinia; 1860–1861 | Succeeded by Piedmont-Sardinia absorbed into Kingdom of Italy |
| Preceded by None | Prime Minister of Italy; 1861 | Succeeded by Bettino Ricasoli |
| Preceded by None | Italian Minister of Foreign Affairs; 1861 | Succeeded by Bettino Ricasoli |
| Preceded by None | Italian Minister of the Navy; 1861 | Succeeded by Luigi Federico, Count Menabrea |
