= Poirino =

- Comune
- Comune di Poirino
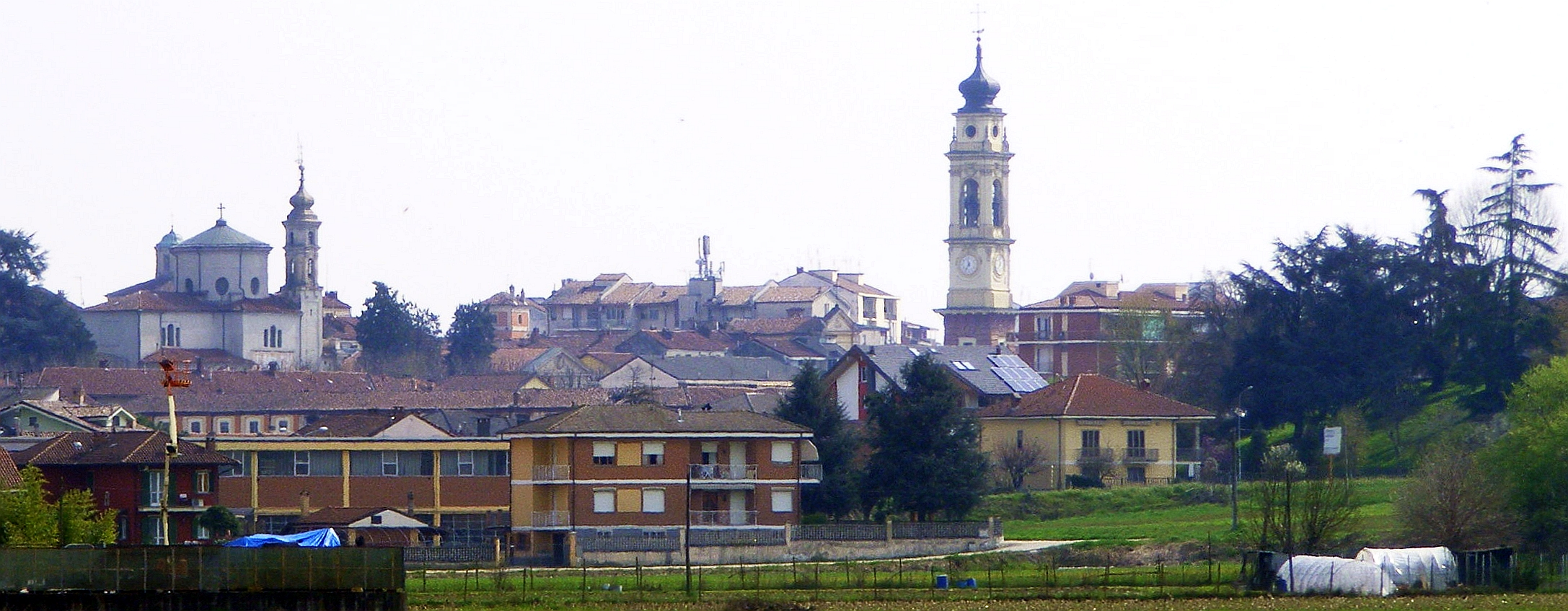

- Coat of arms

- Location within Italy Location within Piedmont
- Coordinates: 44°55′N 7°51′E
- Country: Italy
- Region: Piedmont
- Metropolitan city: Turin (TO)
- Frazioni: Appendini, Avatanei, Balme, Banna, Becchio, Cacceri, Cantavenna, Favari, La Longa, Marocchi, Masio, Palazzo Valgorrera, Rubina, Stuerda, Ternavasso, Tetti Battuti, Tetti Brossa, Tetti Cellaro, Tetti Elia, Torre Valgorrera, Zucchea

Government
  - Mayor: Angelita Mollo

Area
  - Total: 75.62 km^{2} (29.20 sq mi)
- Elevation: 249 m (817 ft)

Population (1-1-2017)
  - Total: 10,635
  - Density: 140.6/km^{2} (364.2/sq mi)
- Demonym: Poirinese(i)
- Time zone: UTC+1 (CET)
  - Summer (DST): UTC+2 (CEST)
- Postal code: 10046
- Dialing code: 011
- Patron saint: St. Ursula
- Saint day: 21 October

Poirino is a comune (municipality) in the Metropolitan City of Turin in the Italian region Piedmont, located about 20 kilometres (12 mi) southeast of Turin.

Poirino borders the following municipalities: Chieri, Riva presso Chieri, Villanova d'Asti, Santena, Villastellone, Isolabella, Cellarengo, Pralormo, Ceresole Alba and Carmagnola.

== Main sights ==
- Tower of Valgorrera
- Castle of Ternavasso.
- Church of Madonna dell'Ala
- Parish church of Santa Maria Maggiore
- Church of Spirito Santo
- Oratory of San Sebastiano.
