= Lago di Malciaussia =

Reservoir in Italy

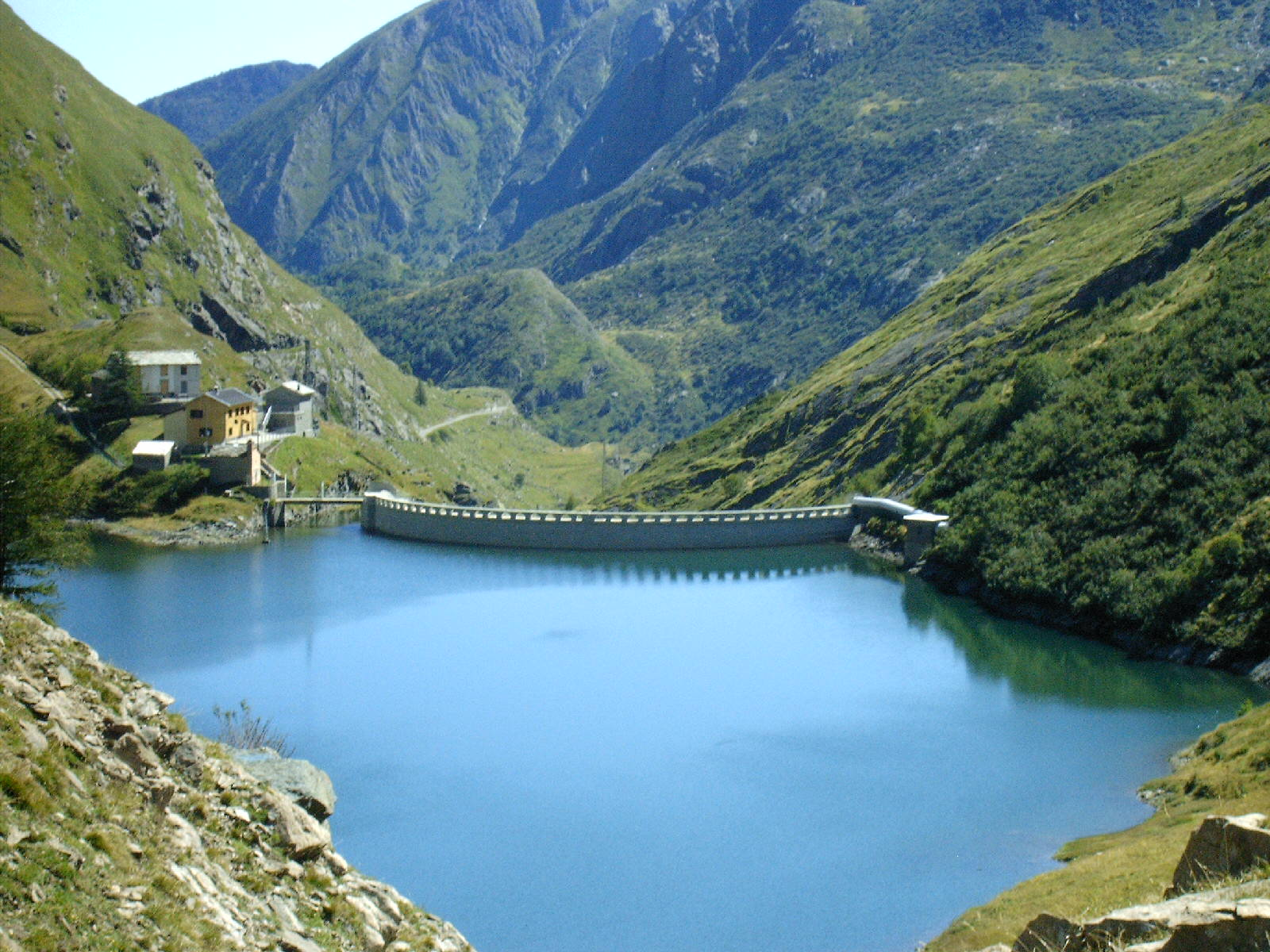

- Location within Piedmont
- Location: Italy, Graian Alps
- Coordinates: 45°12′N 7°8′E
- Primary inflows: Stura di Viù
- Primary outflows: Stura di Viù
- Basin countries: Italy
- Surface elevation: 1,805 m (5,922 ft)

Lago di Malciaussia is a reservoir situated at an elevation of 1,805 metres in the upper Valle di Viù in the north-west Italian province of Turin.

== History ==
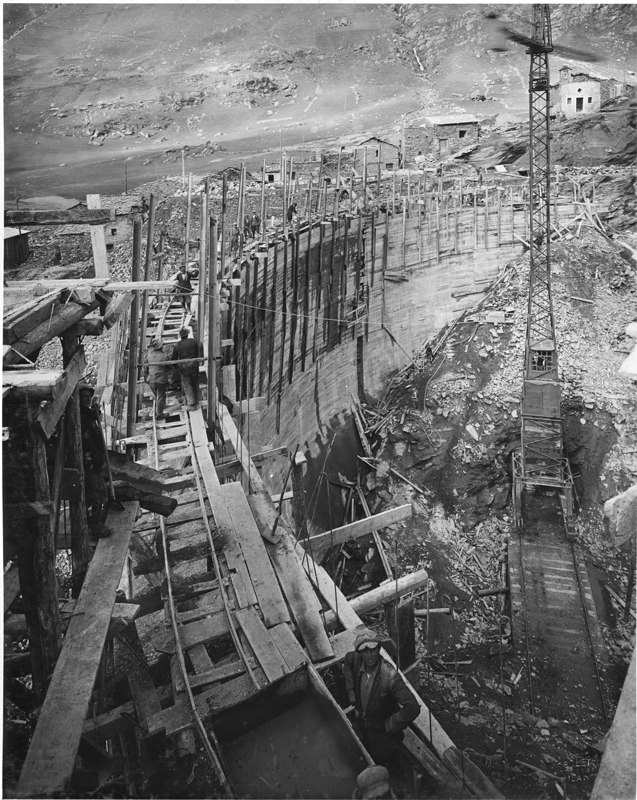
Dam building

The reservoir was constructed in the 1920s and 1930s by damming the Stura di Viù, a tributary of the Stura di Lanzo, for the generation of hydropower. It is named after the locality Malciaussia—a frazione of the commune of Usseglio—which was submerged when it was filled.

== Hiking ==
The valley road terminates at this lake which makes it a convenient starting point for walking and climbing in the high Alps. From here one can ascend Rocciamelone (3,538 m), via the alpine hut “Ernesto Tazzetti”. The routes to Monte Lera, Punta Costan and Punta Sulè start as well from the lake.

== Sources ==
This article originated as a translation of this version of its counterpart in the Italian Wikipedia. Media related to Lago di Malciaussia at Wikimedia Commons
