= Luigi, Count Cibrario =

Italian politician and historian (1802–1870)

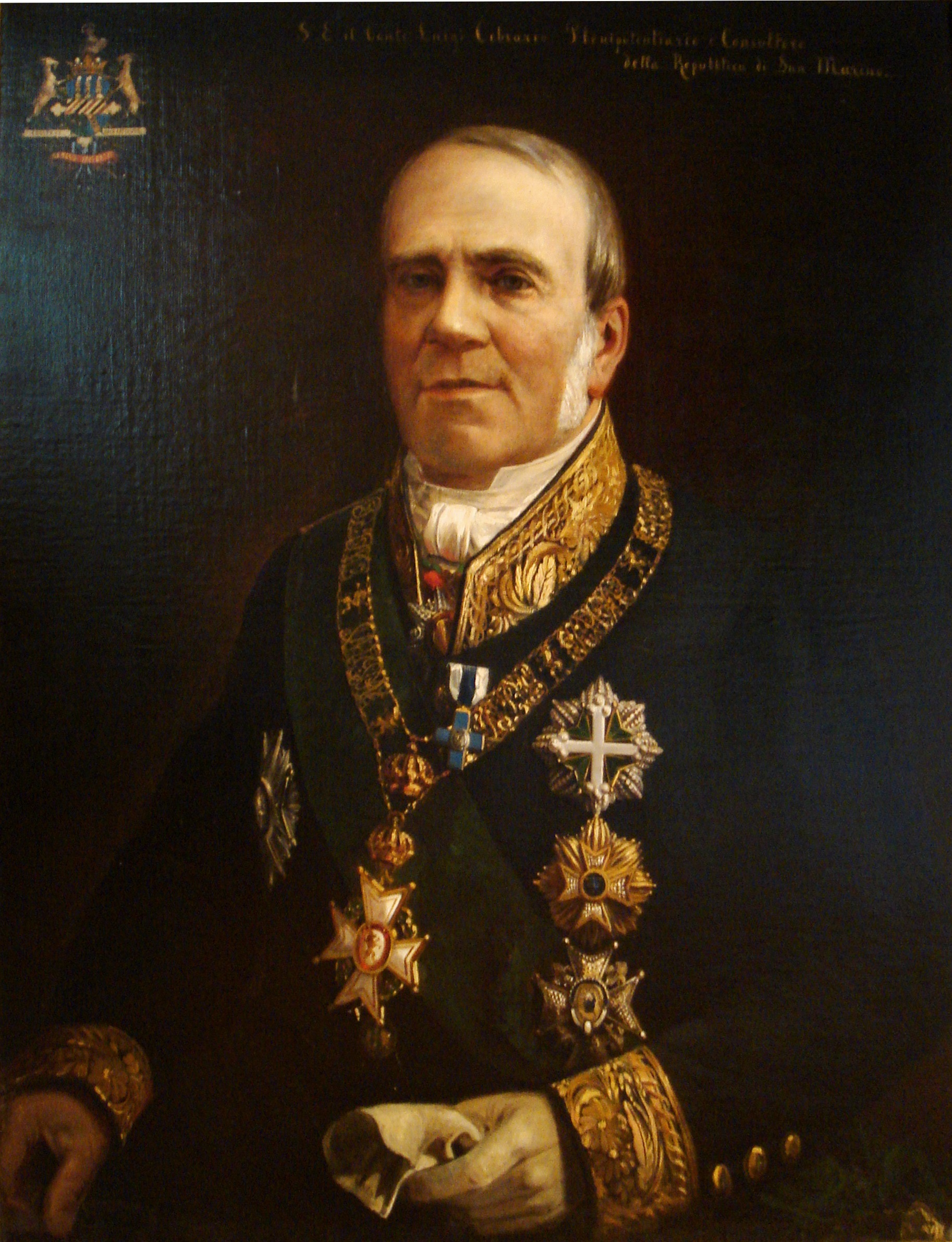
- Born: 23 February 1802; Usseglio
- Died: 1 October 1870 (aged 68); Salò, Lombardy
- Occupations: Statesman, historian
- Title: Count Cibrario

Luigi, Count Cibrario (23 February 1802 in Usseglio, Piedmont – 1 October 1870) was an Italian statesman and historian.

== Biography ==
Born in Usseglio, in what is now the province of Turin, Cibrario was descended from a noble but impoverished Piedmontese family. He won a scholarship at the age of sixteen, and was teaching literature at eighteen. His verses to future king Charles Albert, then prince of Savoy-Carignano, on the birth of his son Victor Emmanuel, attracted the prince's attention and proved the beginning of a long intimacy.

He entered the Sardinian civil service, and in 1824 was appointed lecturer on canon and civil law. His chief interest was the study of ancient documents, and he was sent to search the archives of Switzerland, France and Germany for charters relating to the history of Savoy.

After the Bourbon Restoration in 1815 the Kingdom of Sardinia and the Kingdom of Lombardy–Venetia reintroduced the teaching of history in the Italian primary school, which was firstly adopted by Napoleon. Cibrario authored the textbook titled Notizie sopra la storia dei principi di Savoia date dall’avvocato Luigi Cibrario ad uso delle scuole del Regno di Sardegna. While the history of the House of Savoy was used as a starting chapter point for the national history of Italy, Cibrario derived the genealogy of the House of Savoy from the Burgudian branch of Gisela of Burgundy, Marchioness of Montferrat and of Margaret of Burgundy, Countess of Savoy, therefore denying their purported and commonly accepted Anglo-Saxon root. This new acknowledgement on the House of Savoy reported the internal dynastic pretences in the context of the Roman public law.

During the Revolutions of 1848, after the expulsion of the Austrians from Venice, Cibrario was sent to that city with Colli to negotiate its union with Piedmont. But the proposal fell through when news arrived of the armistice between King Charles Albert and Austria, and the two delegates were made the objects of a hostile demonstration. In October 1848 Cibrario was made senator, and after the Battle of Novara (March 1849), when Charles Albert abdicated and retired to a monastery near Porto, Cibrario and Count Giacinto di Collegno were sent as representatives of the Senate to express the sympathy of that body with the fallen king. He reached Oporto on 28 May, and after staying there for a month returned to Turin, which he reached just before the news of Charles Albert's death.

In May 1852 he became minister of finance in the reconstructed d'Azeglio cabinet, and was later minister of education in that of Cavour. In the same year he was appointed secretary to the Order of Saints Maurice and Lazarus. It was he who in 1853 dictated the vigorous memorandum of protest against the confiscation by Austria of the property of Lombard exiles who had been naturalized in Piedmont. He strongly supported Cavour's Crimean policy (1855), and when General la Marmora departed in command of the expeditionary force and Cavour took the war office, Cibrario was made Minister for Foreign Affairs. He conducted the business of the department with great skill, and ably seconded Cavour in bringing about the admission of Piedmont to the Congress of Paris on an equal footing with the great powers.

On retiring from the foreign office Cibrario was created count. In 1860 he acted as mediator between Victor Emmanuel's government and the republic of San Marino, and arranged a treaty by which the latter's liberties were guaranteed. After the war of 1866 by which Austria lost Venetia, Cibrario negotiated with that government for the restitution of state papers and art treasures removed by it from Lombardy and Venetia to Vienna.

Count Cibrario died near Salò on Lake Garda in autumn 1870.

== Works ==
As a writer and historian, his most important work during his lifetime was his Economia politica del medio evo (Turin, 1839), which enjoyed great popularity at the time, but is now of little value. His Della schiavitù e del servaggio (Milan, 1868–1869) gave an account of the development and abolition of slavery and serfdom. His historical writings include:

- Delle artiglierie dal 1300 al 1700 (1847)
- Origini e progresso della monarchia di Savoia (1854)
- Degli ordini cavallereschi (1846)
- Degli ordini religiosi (1845)
- Memorie segrete of Charles Albert, written by order of Victor Emmanuel but afterwards withdrawn.
