= Dusino San Michele =

- Comune
- Comune di Dusino San Michele
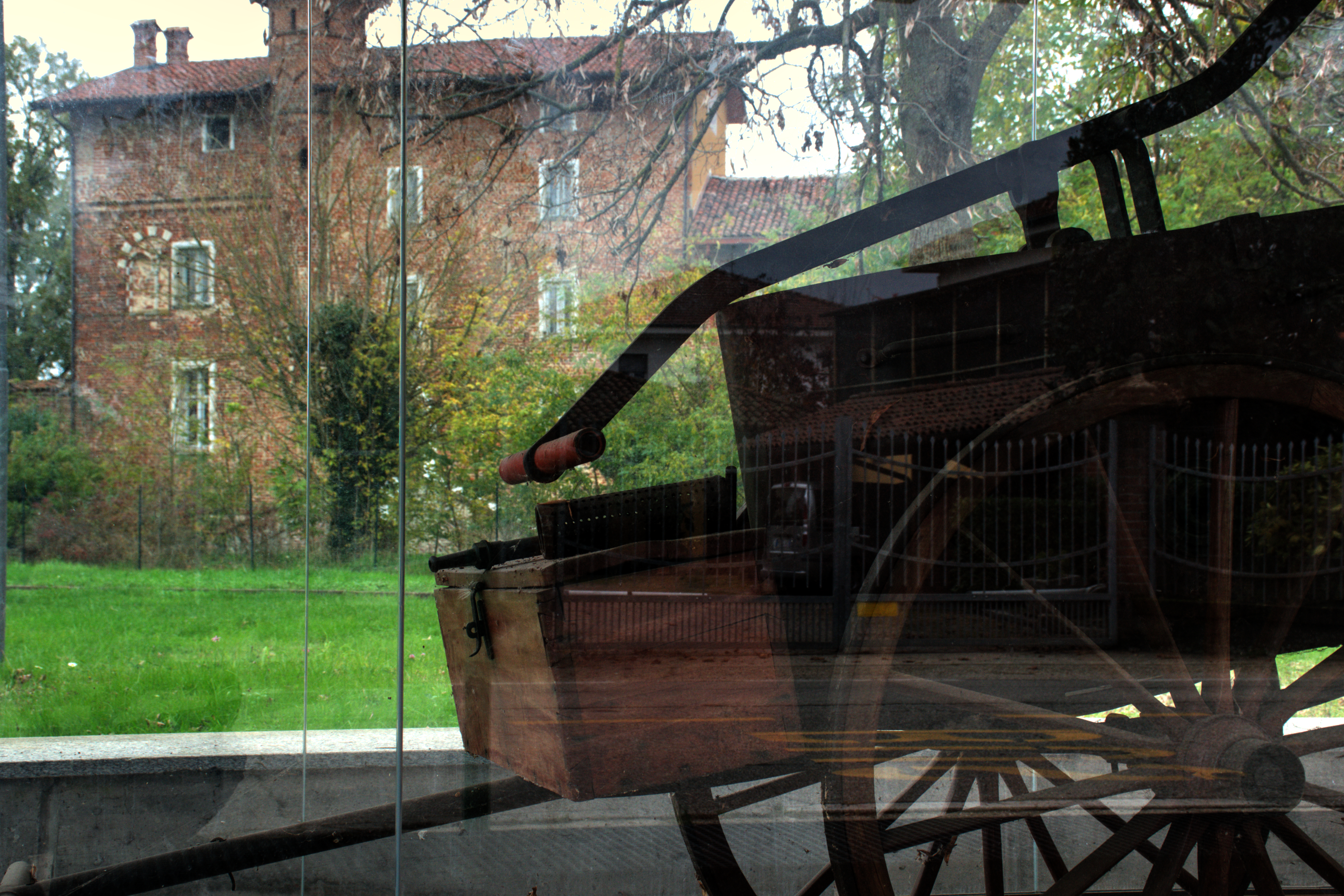

- Coat of arms

- Location within Italy Location within Piedmont
- Coordinates: 44°55′N 7°58′E
- Country: Italy
- Region: Piedmont
- Province: Asti (AT)

Government
  - Mayor: Valter Luigi Malino

Area
  - Total: 11.6 km^{2} (4.5 sq mi)
- Elevation: 264 m (866 ft)

Population (01 January 2020)
  - Total: 1,047
  - Density: 90.3/km^{2} (234/sq mi)
- Demonym: Dusinesi
- Time zone: UTC+1 (CET)
  - Summer (DST): UTC+2 (CEST)
- Postal code: 14010
- Dialing code: 0141
- ISTAT code: 005052
- Patron saint: St. Roch
- Saint day: 16 August
- Website: https://www.comune.dusinosanmichele.at.it/it

Dusino San Michele is a comune (municipality) in the Province of Asti in the Italian region Piedmont, located about 25 kilometres (16 mi) southeast of Turin and about 20 kilometres (12 mi) west of Asti.

Dusino San Michele borders the following municipalities: Cantarana, San Paolo Solbrito, Valfenera, Villafranca d'Asti, and Villanova d'Asti.
