= San Paolo Solbrito =

- Comune
- Comune di San Paolo Solbrito
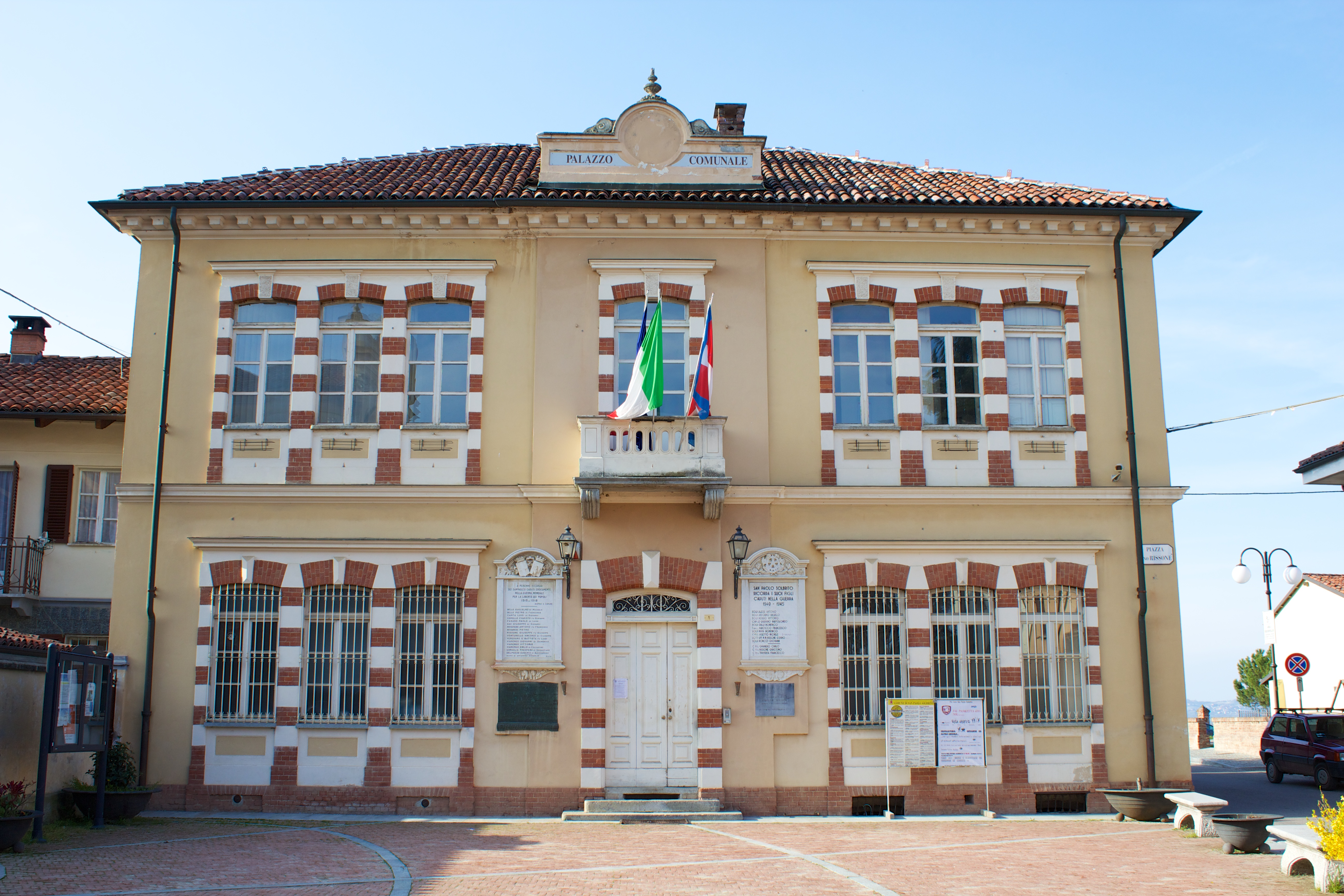
- Town hall

- Coat of arms

- Location within Italy Location within Piedmont
- Coordinates: 44°57′N 7°58′E
- Country: Italy
- Region: Piedmont
- Province: Province of Asti (AT)

Area
  - Total: 11.9 km^{2} (4.6 sq mi)

Population (Dec. 2004)
  - Total: 1,127
  - Density: 94.7/km^{2} (245/sq mi)
- Time zone: UTC+1 (CET)
  - Summer (DST): UTC+2 (CEST)
- Postal code: 14010
- Dialing code: 0141

San Paolo Solbrito is a comune (municipality) in the Province of Asti in the Italian region Piedmont, located about 25 kilometres (16 mi) southeast of Turin and about 20 kilometres (12 mi) northwest of Asti. As of 31 December 2004, it had a population of 1,127 and an area of 11.9 square kilometres (4.6 mi^{2}).

San Paolo Solbrito borders the following municipalities: Dusino San Michele, Montafia, Roatto, Villafranca d'Asti, and Villanova d'Asti.

== Demographic evolution ==
Historical population

Year	Pop.	±%
1861	1,495	—
1871	1,494	−0.1%
1881	1,452	−2.8%
1901	1,574	+8.4%
1911	1,404	−10.8%

Year	Pop.	±%
1921	1,221	−13.0%
1931	1,116	−8.6%
1936	1,068	−4.3%
1951	985	−7.8%
1961	883	−10.4%

Year	Pop.	±%
1971	782	−11.4%
1981	778	−0.5%
1991	856	+10.0%
2001	1,059	+23.7%

Source: Data from ISTAT
