= Montafia =

- Comune
- Comune di Montafia
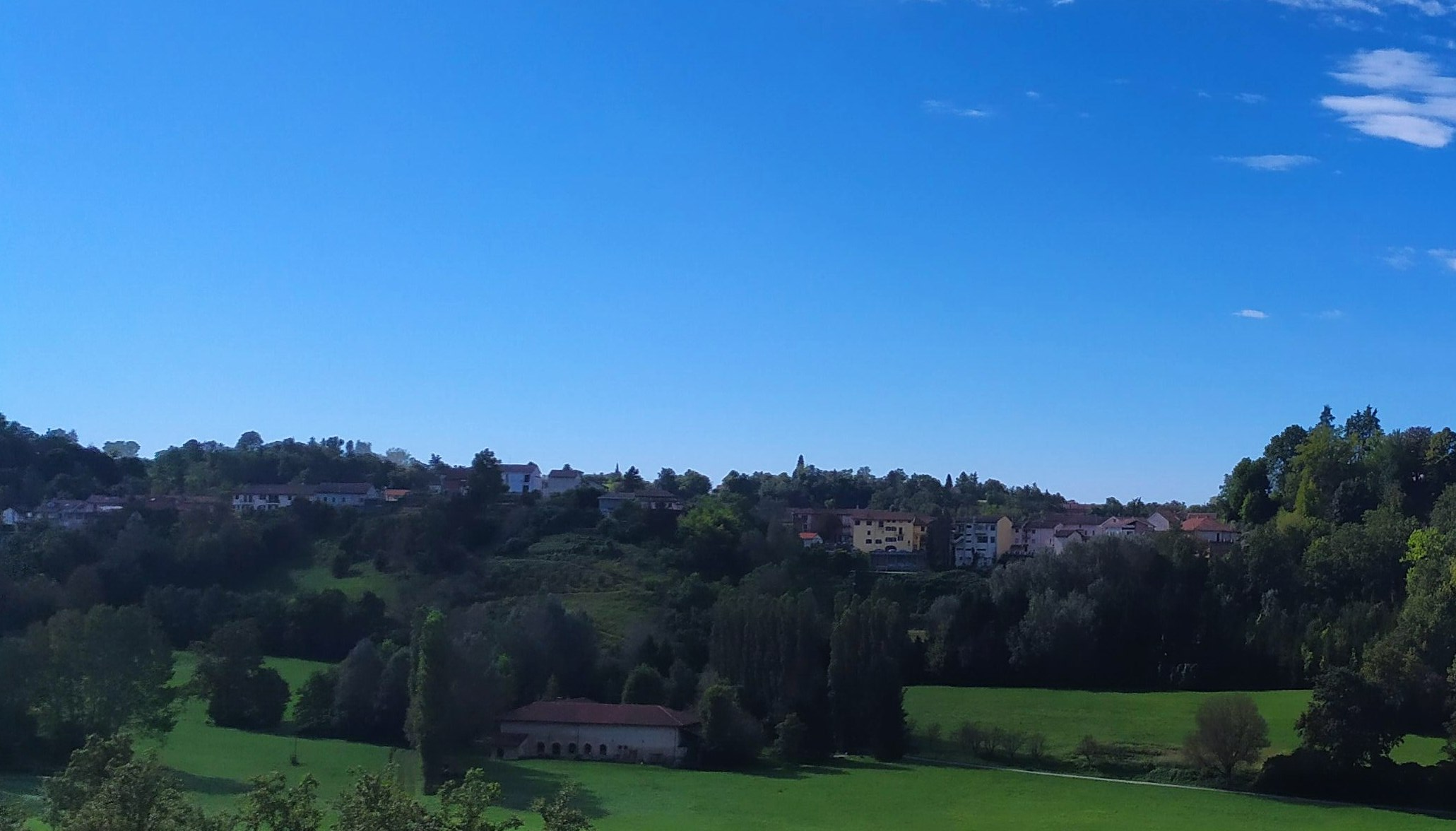
- View of Montafia

- Coat of arms

- Location within Italy Location within Piedmont
- Coordinates: 44°59′N 8°1′E
- Country: Italy
- Region: Piedmont
- Province: Province of Asti (AT)

Government
  - Mayor: Giovanni Marchesi (Progetto Montafia)

Area
  - Total: 14.6 km^{2} (5.6 sq mi)

Population (Jan. 2024)
  - Total: 950
  - Density: 65/km^{2} (170/sq mi)
- Time zone: UTC+1 (CET)
  - Summer (DST): UTC+2 (CEST)
- Postal code: 14014
- Dialing code: 0141
- Patron saint: Denis of Paris
- Saint day: 9 October

Montafia is a comune (municipality) in the Province of Asti in the Italian region Piedmont, located about 25 kilometres (16 mi) southeast of Turin and about 15 kilometres (9 mi) northwest of Asti. As of 31 January 2024, it had a population of 950 and an area of 14.6 square kilometres (5.6 mi^{2}).

Montafia borders the following municipalities: Buttigliera d'Asti, Capriglio, Cortazzone, Piea, Piovà Massaia, Roatto, San Paolo Solbrito, Viale, and Villanova d'Asti.

== Demographic evolution ==
Historical population

Year	Pop.	±%
1861	1,577	—
1871	1,640	+4.0%
1881	1,693	+3.2%
1901	1,891	+11.7%
1911	1,928	+2.0%
1921	1,720	−10.8%

Year	Pop.	±%
1931	1,593	−7.4%
1936	1,487	−6.7%
1951	1,279	−14.0%
1961	1,039	−18.8%
1971	925	−11.0%
1981	828	−10.5%

Year	Pop.	±%
1991	855	+3.3%
2001	934	+9.2%
2011	904	−3.2%
2021	927	+2.5%

Source: Data from ISTAT
