= Isolabella, Turin =

Isolabella
- Comune
- Comune di Isolabella
- Coat of arms

- Location within Italy Location within Piedmont
- Coordinates: 44°54′N 7°55′E
- Country: Italy
- Region: Piedmont
- Metropolitan city: Turin (TO)

Government
  - Mayor: Silvia Colombatto Raimondo

Area
  - Total: 4.77 km^{2} (1.84 sq mi)
- Elevation: 256 m (840 ft)

Population (30 November 2017)
  - Total: 381
  - Density: 79.9/km^{2} (207/sq mi)
- Demonym: Isolabellesi
- Time zone: UTC+1 (CET)
  - Summer (DST): UTC+2 (CEST)
- Postal code: 10046
- Dialing code: 011
- Patron saint: St. Bernard
- Saint day: 20 August
- Website: Official website

Isolabella is a comune (municipality) in the Metropolitan City of Turin in the Italian region Piedmont, located about 25 kilometres (16 mi) southeast of Turin.

Isolabella borders the following municipalities: Villanova d'Asti, Poirino, Valfenera and Cellarengo.
