= Punta Sulè =

Mountain in Italy

- Ponta Solé
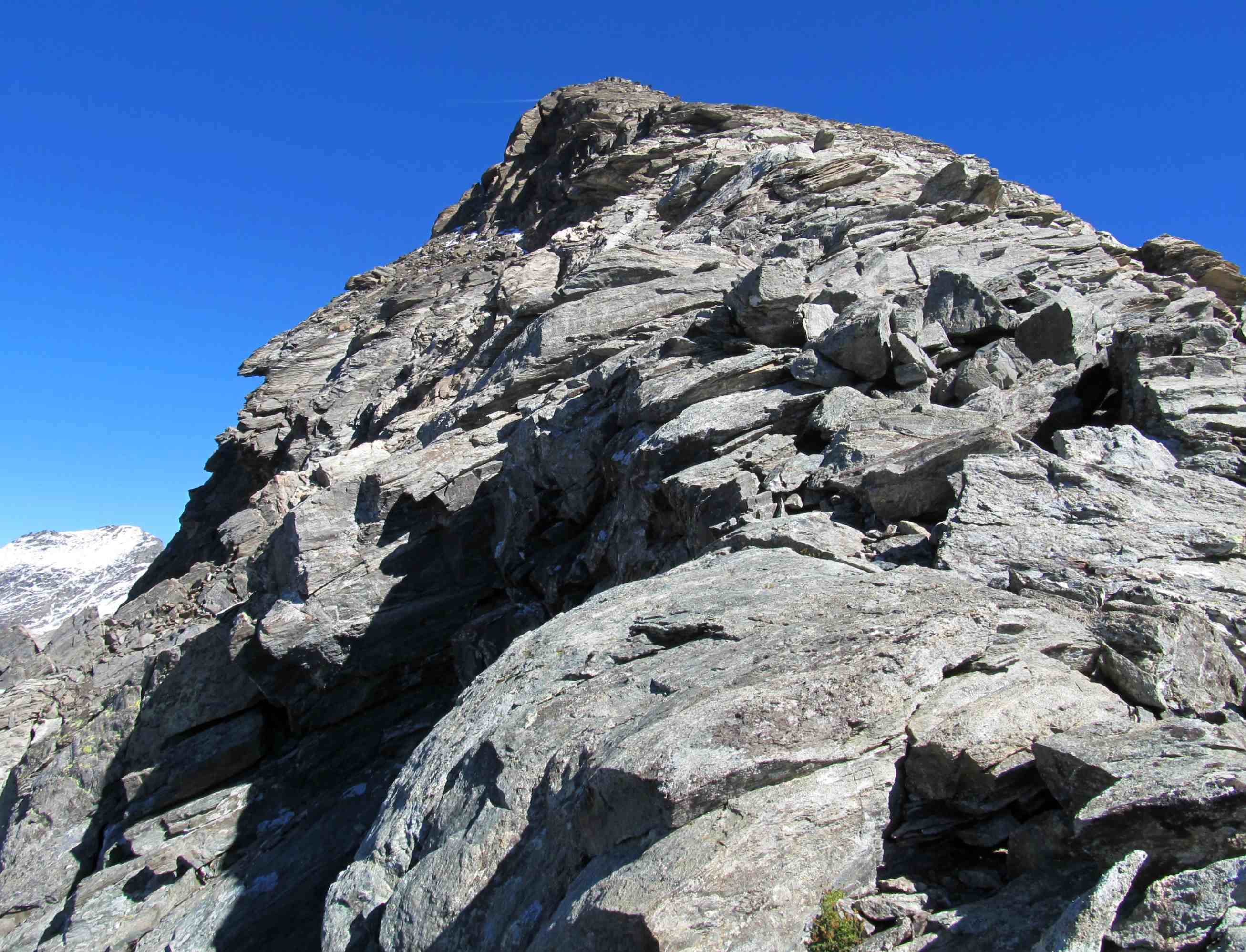

Highest point
- Elevation: 3,384 m (11,102 ft)
- Prominence: 311 m (1,020 ft)
- Isolation: 2.85 km (1.77 mi)
- Listing: Alpine mountains above 3000 m
- Coordinates: 45°13′51.6″N 07°08′13.2″E

Geography
- Location within Alps
- Location: Piedmont, Italy
- Parent range: Graian Alps

Climbing
- First ascent: Filippo Vallino
- Easiest route: Scrambling

Punta Sulè (in Piedmontese Ponta Solé) is a 3,384 m a.s.l.mountain of the Graian Alps, located in Italy.

== Geography ==
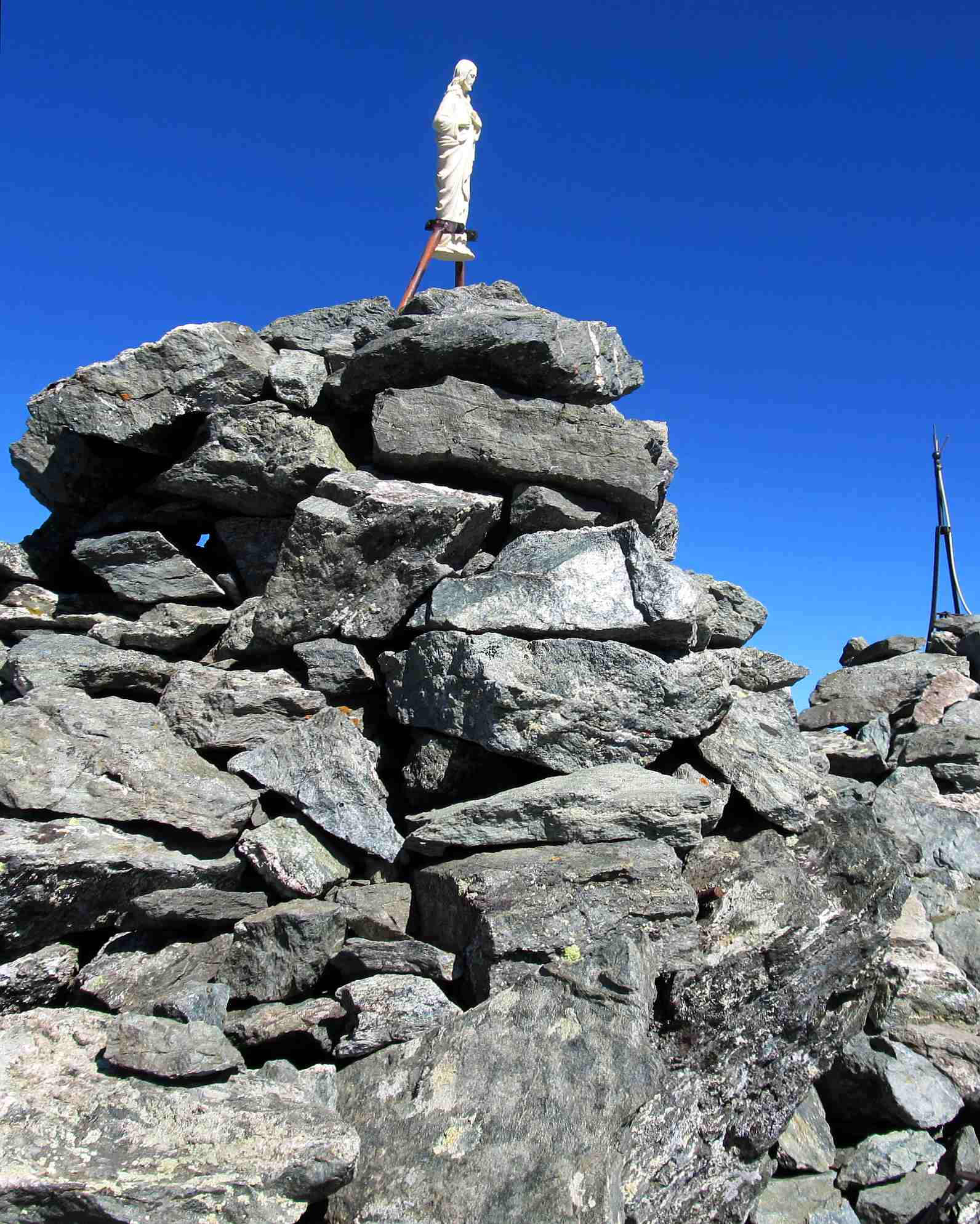
Summit statue

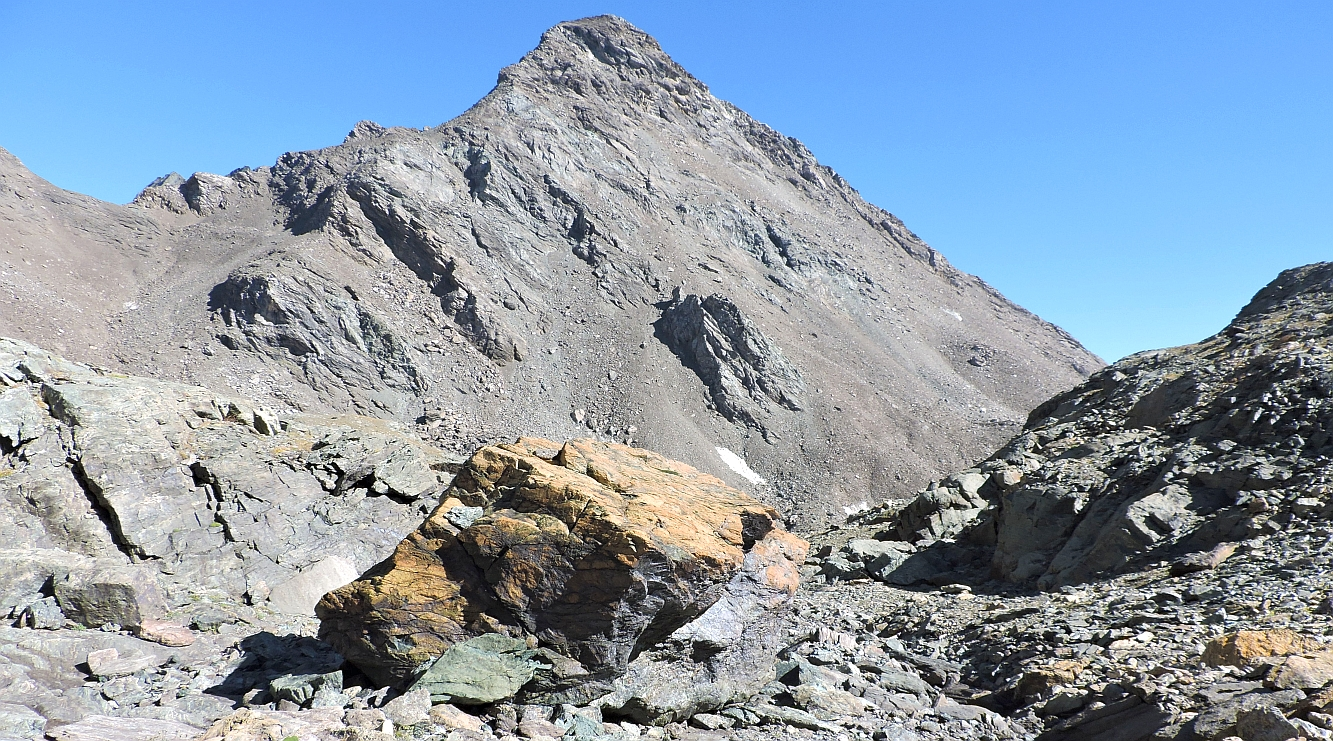
West face

The mountain is the highest elevation of the ridge between the terminal dales of the Stura di Viù valley, Peraciaval (north) and Malciaussia (south). Going northwest the Sulè pass divides Punta Sulè from Testa Sulà (3,073 m a.s.l.), while going east the Colletto della Lera (3,320 m a.s.l.) separates it from Monte Lera.

Administratively, the mountain belongs to the Usseglio municipality (comune).

On the summit a cairn bears a small Jesus Christ statue; on another nearby cairn is located a lightning rod. On clear days, it offers a good view of many important mountains of the Western Alps, including Argentera group, Viso, Dauphiné Alps, Bianco, Gran Paradiso and Rosa.

=== SOIUSA classification ===
According to the SOIUSA (International Standardized Mountain Subdivision of the Alps) the mountain can be classified in the following way:

- main part = Western Alps
- major sector = North Western Alps
- section = Graian Alps
- subsection = South-Eastern Graian Alps
- supergroup = Catena Arnas-Ciamarella
- group = Gruppo Autaret-Ovarda
- subgroup = Cresta Autaret-Lera-Arnas
- code = I/B-7.I-B.4.a

== History ==
The first recorded ascent to Punta Sulè was carried out by Filippo Vallino on August 16, 1880.

== Access to the summit ==
The usual route to Punta Sulè starts from lago di Malciaussia and, after Pian Sulè, reaches the summit following the SW ridge of the mountain. While long (around 1,600 metres of vertical drop) this route does not require alpinistic skills but just scrambling. In the Italian scale of hiking difficulty is rated EE (Escursionisti Esperti, namely suitable for expert hikers). The traverse from Punta Sulè to Monte Lera is considered an alpine route, rated as PD grade.

== Maps ==
- Istituto Geografico Militare (IGM) official maps of Italy, 1:25.000 and 1:100.000 scale, on-line version
- Istituto Geografico Centrale (IGC) - Carta dei sentieri e dei rifugi scala 1:50.000 n. 2 Valli di Lanzo e Moncenisio
- Istituto Geografico Centrale - Carta dei sentieri e dei rifugi scala 1:25.000 n.110 Alte Valli di Lanzo (Rocciamelone - Uja di Ciamarella - Le Levanne)
