= Ferrere =

- Comune
- Comune di Ferrere
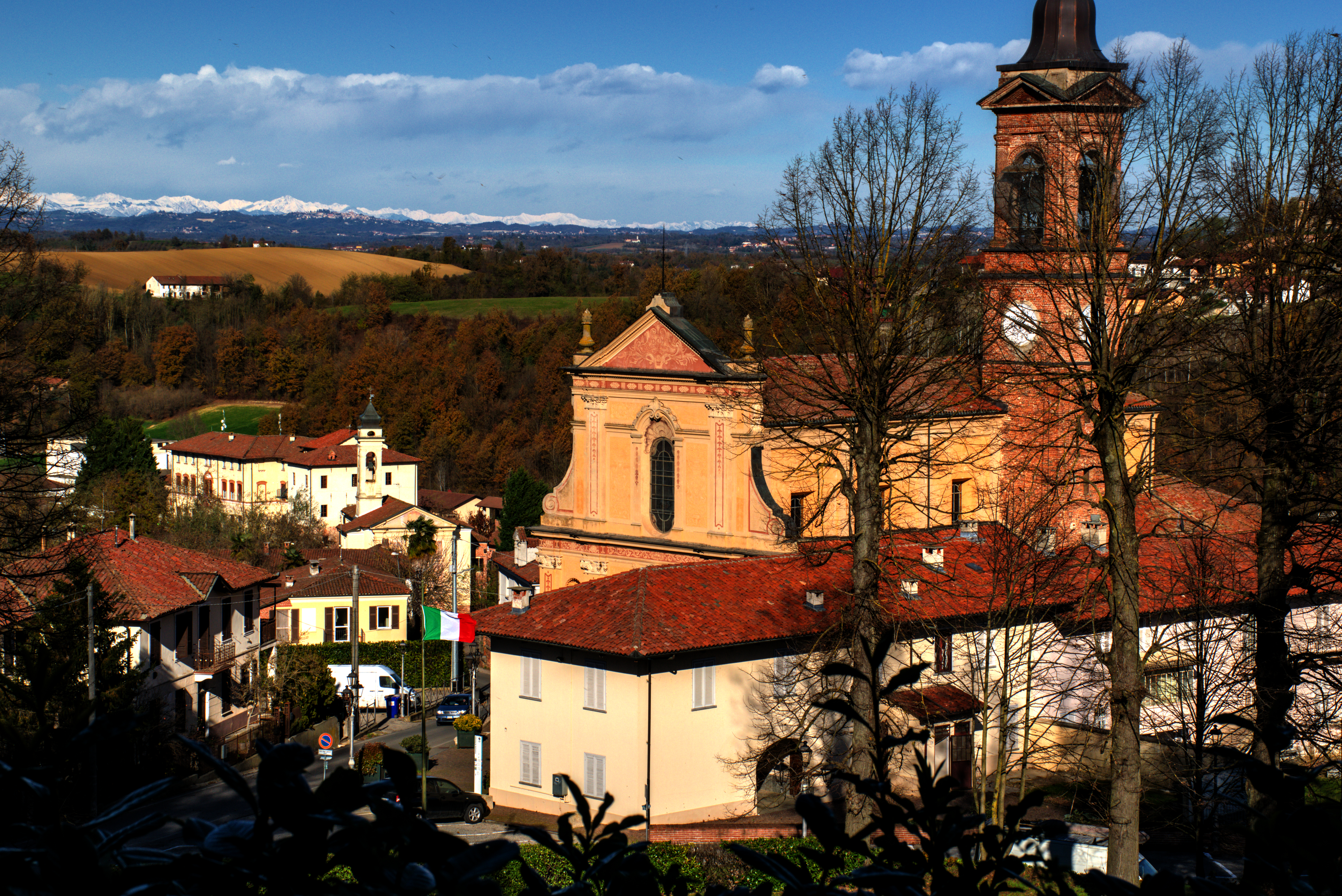

- Location within Italy Location within Piedmont
- Coordinates: 44°53′N 8°0′E
- Country: Italy
- Region: Piedmont
- Province: Province of Asti (AT)

Area
  - Total: 13.9 km^{2} (5.4 sq mi)

Population (Dec. 2004)
  - Total: 1,542
  - Density: 111/km^{2} (287/sq mi)
- Time zone: UTC+1 (CET)
  - Summer (DST): UTC+2 (CEST)
- Postal code: 14012
- Dialing code: 0141

Ferrere is a comune (municipality) in the Province of Asti in the Italian region Piedmont, located about 30 kilometres (19 mi) southeast of Turin and about 15 kilometres (9 mi) west of Asti. As of 31 December 2004, it had a population of 1,542 and an area of 13.9 square kilometres (5.4 mi^{2}).

Ferrere borders the following municipalities: Cantarana, Cisterna d'Asti, Montà, San Damiano d'Asti, and Valfenera.

== Demographic evolution ==
Historical population

Year	Pop.	±%
1861	2,080	—
1871	2,175	+4.6%
1881	2,220	+2.1%
1901	2,589	+16.6%
1911	2,604	+0.6%

Year	Pop.	±%
1921	2,506	−3.8%
1931	2,274	−9.3%
1936	2,083	−8.4%
1951	1,731	−16.9%
1961	1,316	−24.0%

Year	Pop.	±%
1971	1,237	−6.0%
1981	1,230	−0.6%
1991	1,307	+6.3%
2001	1,473	+12.7%

Source: Data from ISTAT

== Twin towns ==
Ferrere is twinned with:

- La Francia, Argentina (1998)
- Predazzo, Italy (2005)
