= Roatto =

- Comune
- Comune di Roatto
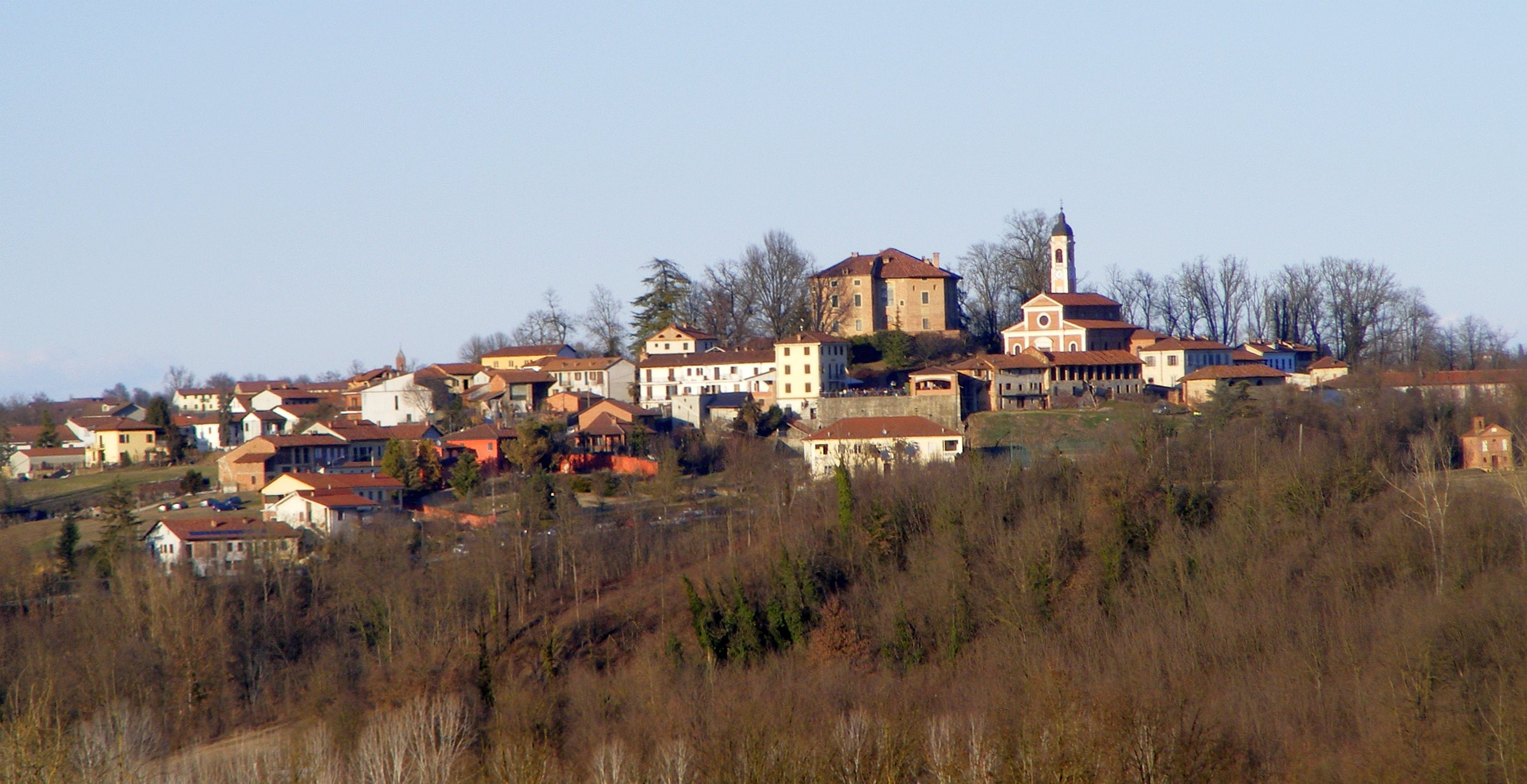
- View from Madonna di Volpiglio

- Coat of arms

- Location within Italy Location within Piedmont
- Coordinates: 44°57′N 8°2′E
- Country: Italy
- Region: Piedmont
- Province: Province of Asti (AT)

Area
  - Total: 6.5 km^{2} (2.5 sq mi)

Population (Dec. 2004)
  - Total: 385
  - Density: 59/km^{2} (150/sq mi)
- Demonym: Roattesi
- Time zone: UTC+1 (CET)
  - Summer (DST): UTC+2 (CEST)
- Postal code: 14018
- Dialing code: 0141

Roatto is a comune (municipality) in the Province of Asti in the Italian region Piedmont, located about 30 kilometres (19 mi) southeast of Turin and about 14 kilometres (9 mi) northwest of Asti. As of 31 December 2004, it had a population of 385 and an area of 6.5 square kilometres (2.5 mi^{2}).

Roatto borders the following municipalities: Cortazzone, Maretto, Montafia, San Paolo Solbrito, and Villafranca d'Asti.

== Demographic evolution ==
Historical population

Year	Pop.	±%
1861	646	—
1871	707	+9.4%
1881	730	+3.3%
1901	868	+18.9%
1911	872	+0.5%

Year	Pop.	±%
1921	835	−4.2%
1931	765	−8.4%
1936	729	−4.7%
1951	652	−10.6%
1961	507	−22.2%

Year	Pop.	±%
1971	344	−32.1%
1981	335	−2.6%
1991	323	−3.6%
2001	373	+15.5%

Source: Data from ISTAT

The municipality is part of the comunità collinare Valtriversa.
