= Valfenera =

- Comune
- Comune di Valfenera
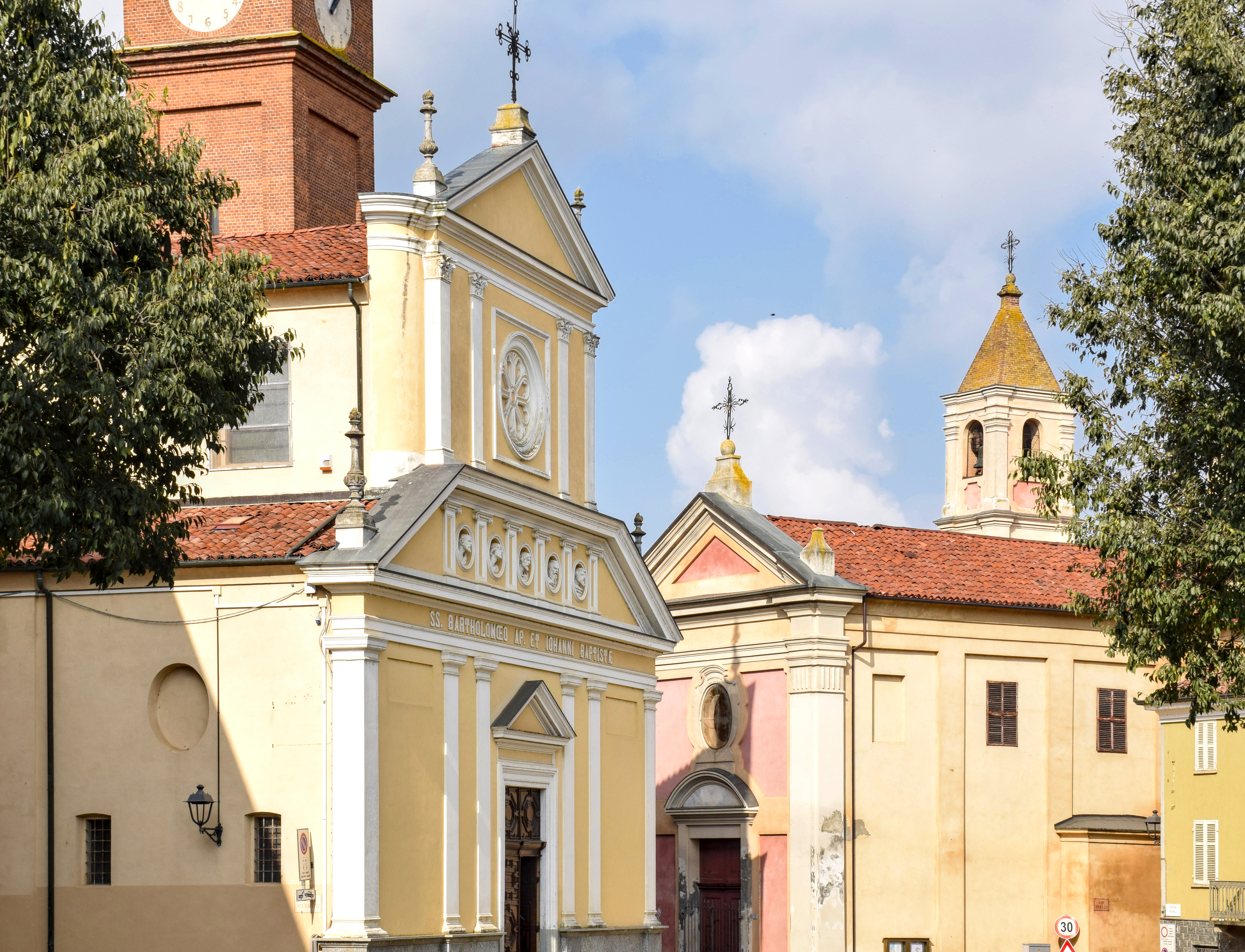

- Coat of arms

- Location within Italy Location within Piedmont
- Coordinates: 44°54′N 7°58′E
- Country: Italy
- Region: Piedmont
- Province: Asti (AT)

Government
  - Mayor: Paolo Lanfranco

Area
  - Total: 22.2 km^{2} (8.6 sq mi)
- Elevation: 282 m (925 ft)

Population (31 May 2007)
  - Total: 2,368
  - Density: 107/km^{2} (276/sq mi)
- Demonym: Valfeneresi
- Time zone: UTC+1 (CET)
  - Summer (DST): UTC+2 (CEST)
- Postal code: 14017
- Dialing code: 0141

Valfenera is a comune (municipality) in the Province of Asti in the Italian region Piedmont, located about 30 kilometres (19 mi) southeast of Turin and about 20 kilometres (12 mi) west of Asti.

Valfenera borders the following municipalities: Cantarana, Cellarengo, Dusino San Michele, Ferrere, Isolabella, Montà, and Villanova d'Asti.
