= Usseglio =

Usseglio Ussèj (Piedmontese) Usei (Arpitan) Ussel (French)
- Comune
- Comune di Usseglio
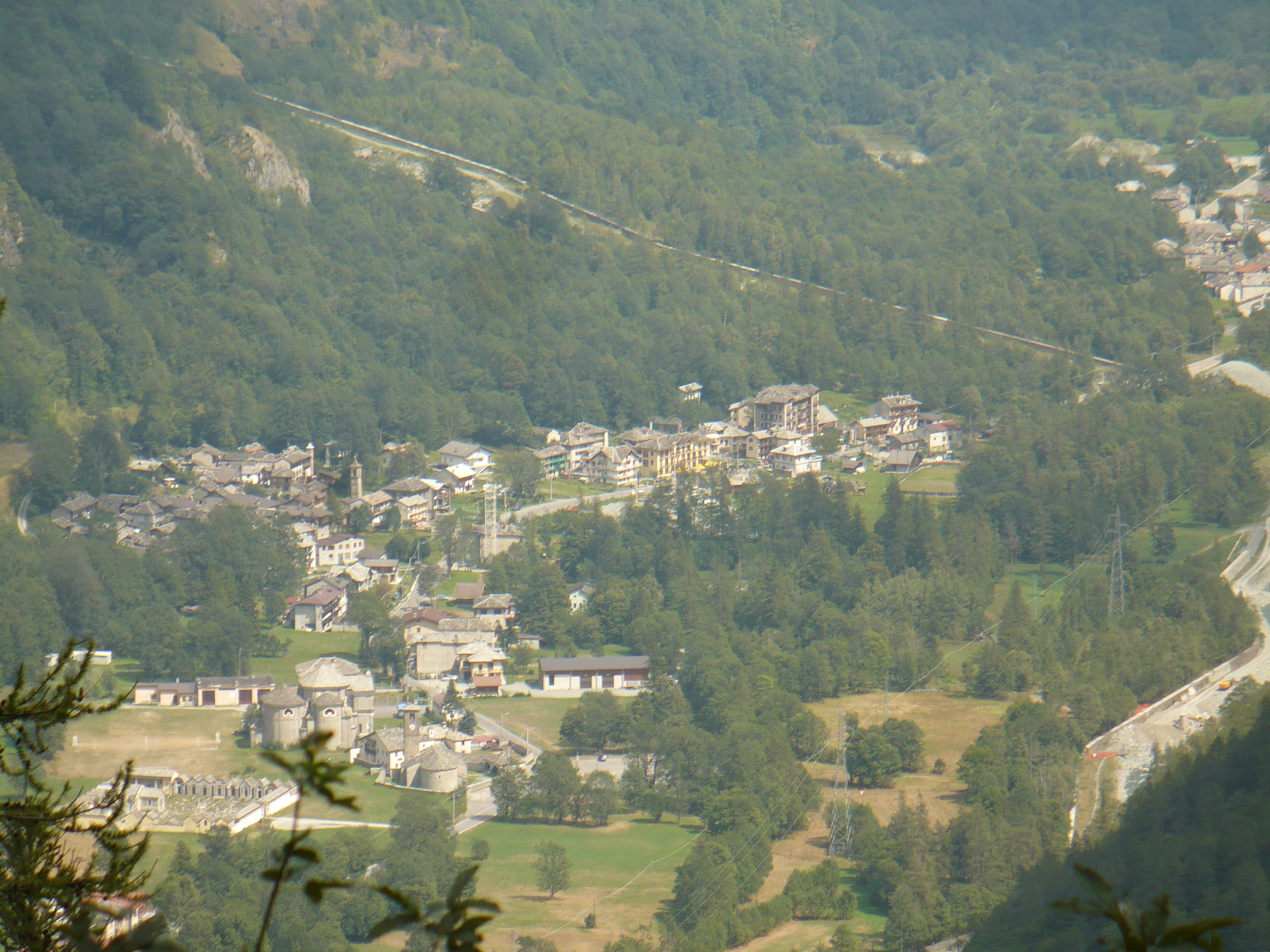

- Coat of arms

- Location within Italy Location within Piedmont
- Coordinates: 45°14′N 7°13′E
- Country: Italy
- Region: Piedmont
- Metropolitan city: Turin (TO)
- Frazioni: Chiaberto, Cortevicio, Crot, Malciaussia, Margone, Perinera, Pian Benot, Pianetto, Piazzette, Quagliera, Villaretto

Government
  - Mayor: Pier Mario Grosso

Area
  - Total: 98.54 km^{2} (38.05 sq mi)
- Elevation: 1,260 m (4,130 ft)

Population (1 January 2017)
  - Total: 209
  - Density: 2.12/km^{2} (5.49/sq mi)
- Demonym: Ussegliesi
- Time zone: UTC+1 (CET)
  - Summer (DST): UTC+2 (CEST)
- Postal code: 10070
- Dialing code: 0123
- Website: Official website

Usseglio (Piedmontese: Ussèj, Arpitan: Usèi, French: Ussel) is a comune (municipality) in the Metropolitan City of Turin in the Italian region Piedmont, located about 40 kilometres (25 mi) northwest of Turin, on the border with France. It borders with the following municipalities: Balme, Bessans (France), Bruzolo, Bussoleno, Chianocco, Condove, Lemie, Mompantero, Novalesa.

Usseglio is a member of Cittaslow.

== What to do ==
Usseglio hosts the only Miniature golf 18-hole course in the area with night-time lighting and table tennis tables.

== See also ==
- Punta Sulè
- Rocciamelone
- Lago di Malciaussia
- Viù
