= Cantarana =

- Comune
- Comune di Cantarana
- Location within Italy Location within Piedmont
- Coordinates: 44°54′N 8°2′E
- Country: Italy
- Region: Piedmont
- Province: Province of Asti (AT)
- Frazioni: Concentrico, Palazzasso, Torrazzo, Arboschio, Serralunga, Bricco dell'oca, Bricco Grosso, Bricco Aguggia, Bricco Barrano

Area
  - Total: 9.8 km^{2} (3.8 sq mi)
- Elevation: 176 m (577 ft)

Population (Dec. 2004)
  - Total: 863
  - Density: 88/km^{2} (230/sq mi)
- Demonym: Cantaranesi
- Time zone: UTC+1 (CET)
  - Summer (DST): UTC+2 (CEST)
- Postal code: 14010
- Dialing code: 0141
- Website: Official website

Cantarana is a comune (municipality) in the Province of Asti in the Italian region Piedmont, located about 30 kilometres (19 mi) southeast of Turin and about 13 kilometres (8 mi) west of Asti. As of 31 December 2004, it had a population of 863 and an area of 9.8 square kilometres (3.8 mi^{2}).

The municipality of Cantarana contains the frazioni (subdivisions, mainly villages and hamlets) Concentrico, Palazzasso, Torrazzo, Arboschio, Serralunga, Bricco dell'oca, Bricco Grosso, Bricco Aguggia, and Bricco Barrano.

Cantarana borders the following municipalities: Dusino San Michele, Ferrere, San Damiano d'Asti, Tigliole, Valfenera, and Villafranca d'Asti.

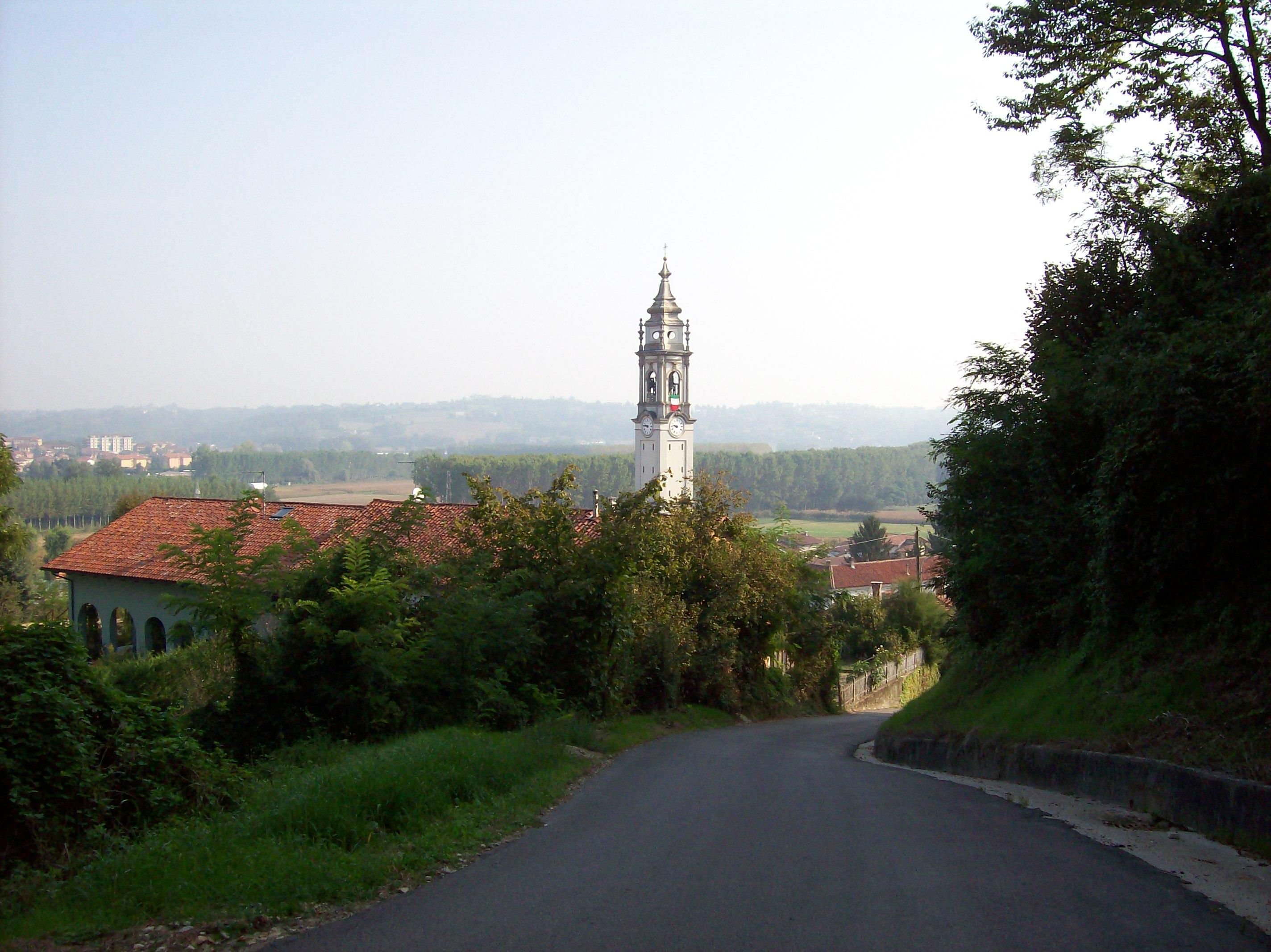
Cantarana Centrum

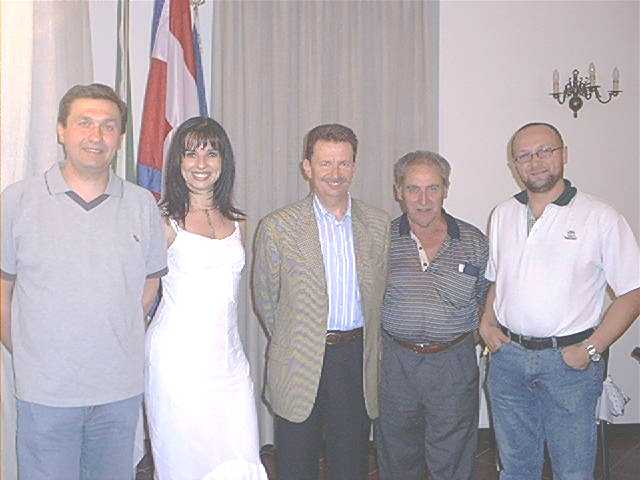
Cantarana, Mayor and Assistants

== Demographic evolution ==
Historical population

| Year | Pop. | ±% |
|---|---|---|
| 1861 | 653 | — |
| 1871 | 681 | +4.3% |
| 1881 | 759 | +11.5% |
| 1901 | 1,016 | +33.9% |
| 1911 | 1,061 | +4.4% |

| Year | Pop. | ±% |
|---|---|---|
| 1921 | 979 | −7.7% |
| 1931 | 900 | −8.1% |
| 1936 | 827 | −8.1% |
| 1951 | 733 | −11.4% |
| 1961 | 653 | −10.9% |

| Year | Pop. | ±% |
|---|---|---|
| 1971 | 586 | −10.3% |
| 1981 | 667 | +13.8% |
| 1991 | 733 | +9.9% |
| 2001 | 839 | +14.5% |

Source: Data from ISTAT

== Twin towns ==
Cantarana is twinned with:

- Chantraine, France (2007)
