= Rocciamelone =

Mountain in Italy

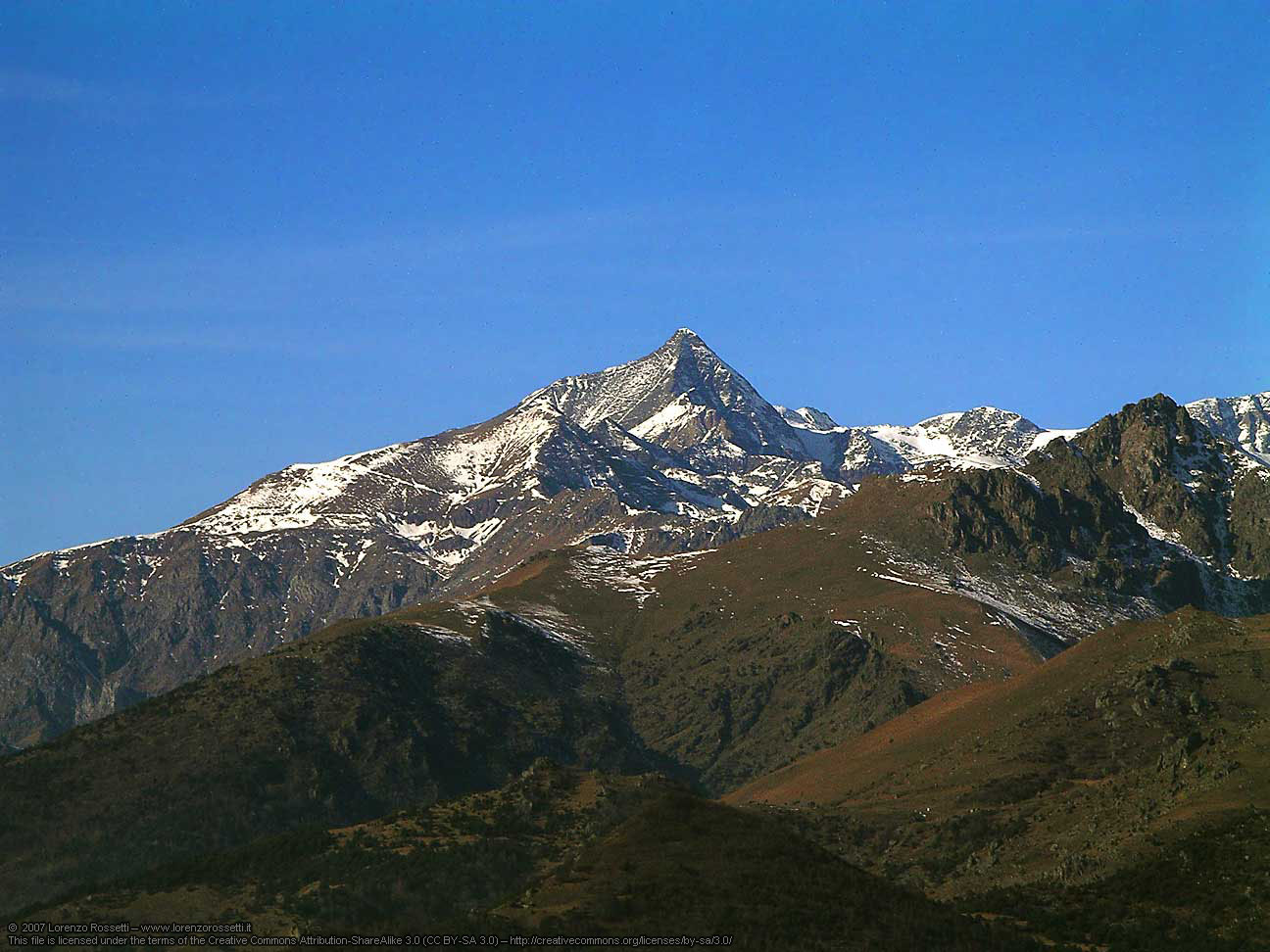
- View from Rocca Sella, Italy (1,508 m)

Highest point
- Elevation: 3,538 m (11,608 ft)
- Prominence: 303 m (994 ft)
- Parent peak: Ouille Mouta (3,565 m)
- Isolation: 7.74 km (4.81 mi)
- Listing: Alpine mountains above 3000 m
- Coordinates: 45°12′14″N 7°4′38″E

Geography
- Location within Alps
- Location: Piedmont, Italy
- Parent range: Graian Alps

Climbing
- First ascent: 1358 by Bonifacius Rotarius
- Easiest route: Scramble, partly roped path

Rocciamelone (Piedmontese: Ròcia-mlon, French: Rochemelon or Roche Melon) is a 3,538 m high mountain in Piedmont, Italy, near its border with France.

== Geography ==
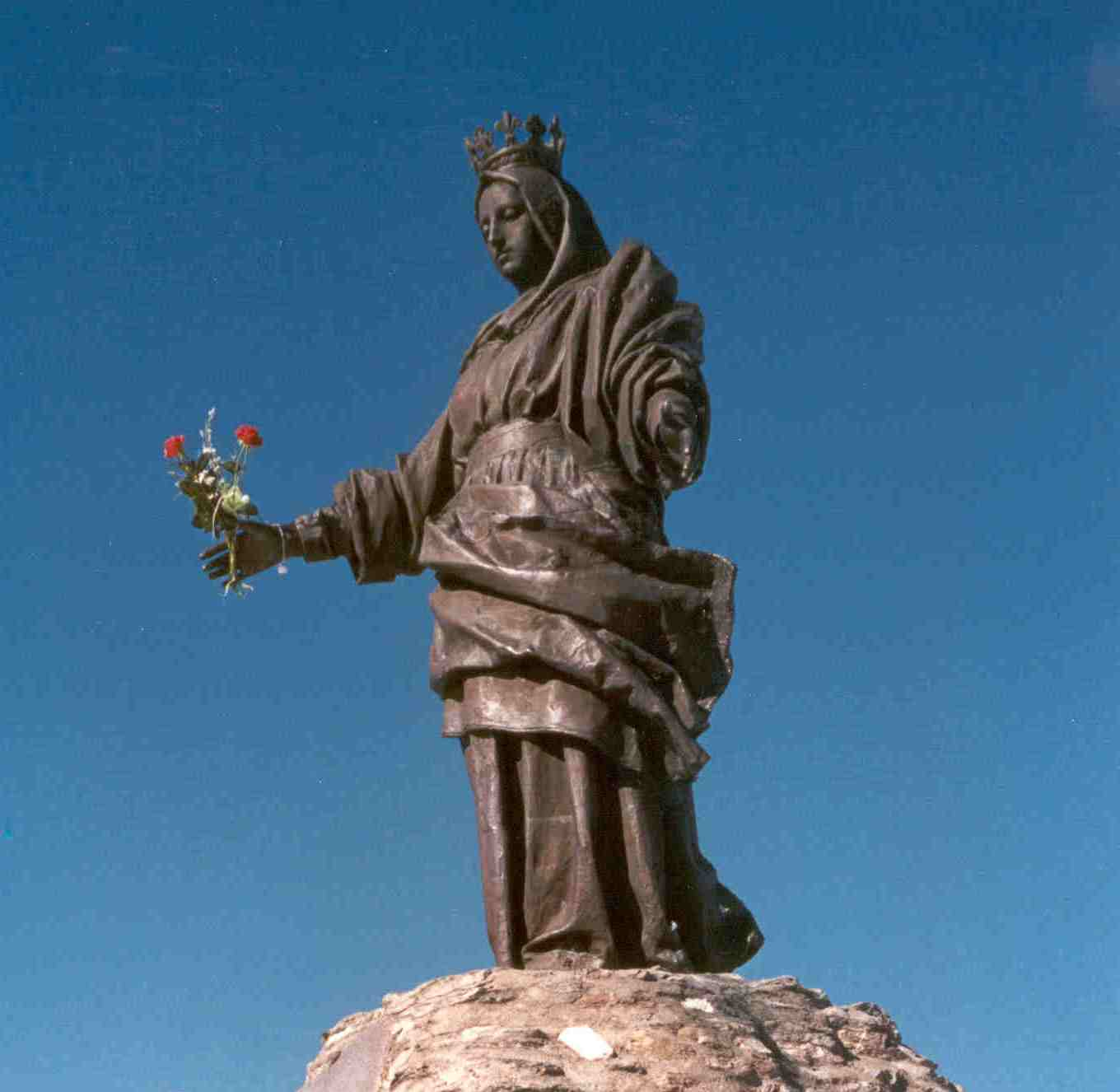
Statue of the Madonna.

Rocciamelone is located between Val di Susa and Maurienne, 50 km west of Turin.

Its summit is the tripoint where the comunes of Usseglio, Novalesa and Mompantero meet. The international border crosses the Glacier de Rochemelon 1 kilometer north of the summit, making it appear that the border is not following the watershed precisely in this sector. However, the glacier is draped over a ridge that is the true watershed and is precisely followed by the borderline.

=== SOIUSA classification ===
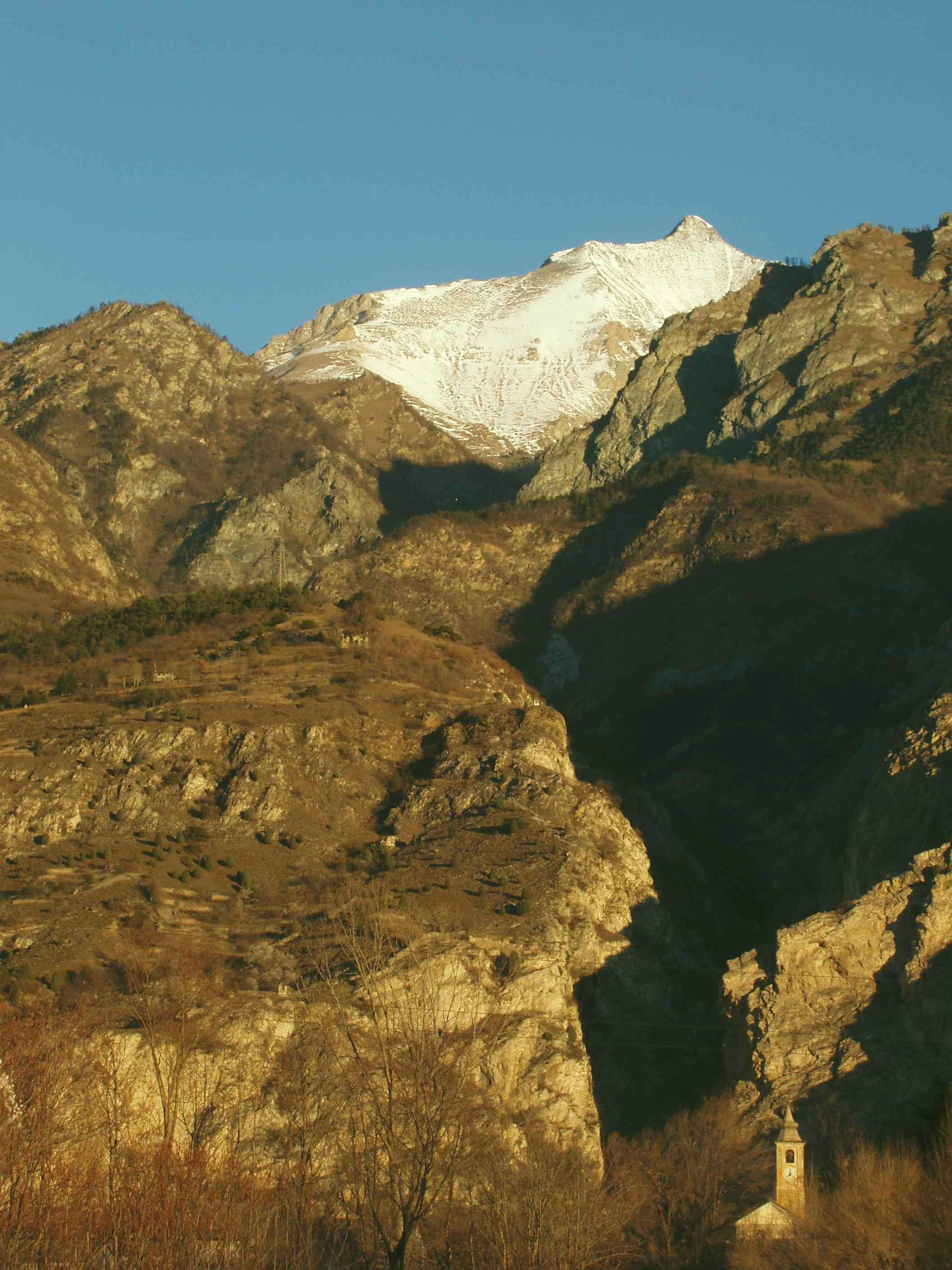
The mountain seen from Foresto (Bussoleno)

According to the SOIUSA (International Standardized Mountain Subdivision of the Alps) the mountain can be classified in the following way:

- main part = Western Alps
- major sector = North Western Alps
- section = Graian Alps
- subsection = Southern Graian Alps
- supergroup = catena Rocciamelone-Charbonnel
- group = gruppo del Rocciamelone
- subgroup = nodo del Rocciamelone
- code = I/B-7.I-A.2.a

== History ==
The Teutonic knight Bonifacius Rotarius (of Asti) made the first ascent of Rocciamelone on 1 September 1358, to bring a small metal image of the Holy Virgin as a gesture of gratitude for having survived captivity in the Holy Land during a war against the Muslims.

The summit of Rocciamelone is the destination of a traditional pilgrimage, every year, on August 5. A three-metre (9.8 ft) statue of the Blessed Virgin Mary (Our Lady of the Summits and the Snows) was erected there in 1899.

== Access to the summit ==
Because of its easy access (the start of the summit trail can be reached in a 90-minute drive from Turin), its considerable height and the panorama, this mountain is one of the most frequented of the western part of the Alps.

== Mountain huts ==
- Rifugio Cà d'Asti (2,854 m - Mompantero)
- Rifugio Ernesto Tazzetti (2,642 - Usseglio)
- Rifugio Santa Maria (close to the summit)

== Maps ==
- Istituto Geografico Militare (IGM) official maps of Italy, 1:25.000 and 1:100.000 scale, on-line version
- Istituto Geografico Centrale (IGC) - Carta dei sentieri e dei rifugi scala 1:50.000 n. 2 Valli di Lanzo e Moncenisio
- Istituto Geografico Centrale - Carta dei sentieri e dei rifugi scala 1:25.000 n.110 Alte Valli di Lanzo (Rocciamelone - Uja di Ciamarella - Le Levanne)
