= Mompantero =

Mompantero Mompantè (Piedmontese) Mumpantia (Arpitan)
- Comune
- Comune di Mompantero
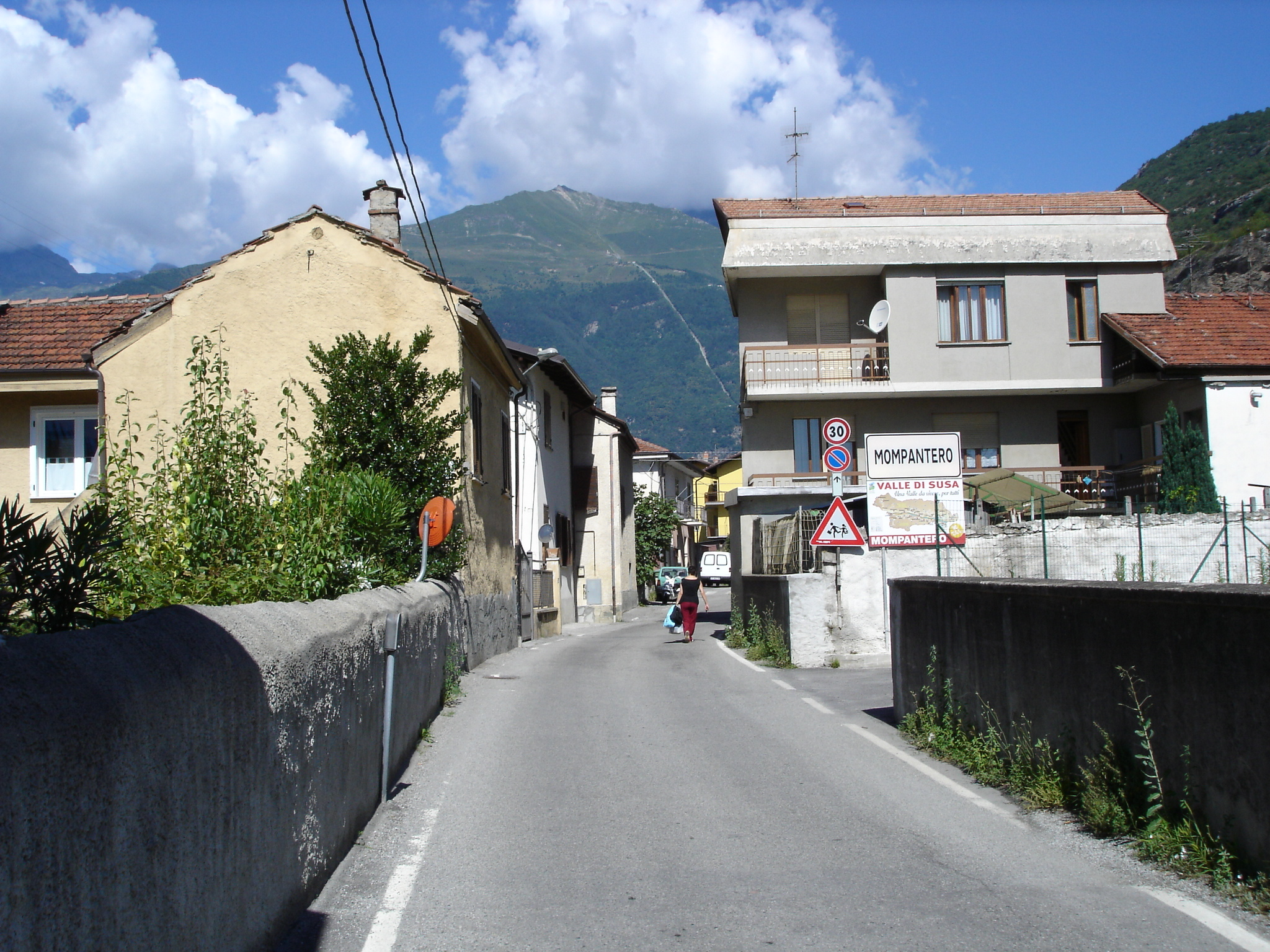

- Coat of arms

- Location within Italy Location within Piedmont
- Coordinates: 45°9′N 7°4′E
- Country: Italy
- Region: Piedmont
- Metropolitan city: Turin (TO)
- Frazioni: Grangia, Marzano, Pietrastretta, San Giuseppe, Seghino, Trinità, Urbiano

Government
  - Mayor: Piera Favro

Area
  - Total: 30.1 km^{2} (11.6 sq mi)
- Elevation: 531 m (1,742 ft)

Population (31 October 2017)
  - Total: 647
  - Density: 21.5/km^{2} (55.7/sq mi)
- Demonym: Mompanteresi
- Time zone: UTC+1 (CET)
  - Summer (DST): UTC+2 (CEST)
- Postal code: 10059
- Dialing code: 0122
- Website: Official website

Mompantero (Piedmontese: Mompantè, Arpitan: Mumpantia) is a comune (municipality) in the Metropolitan City of Turin in the Italian region Piedmont, located about 50 km west of Turin in the Val di Susa, near the entrance of the Val Cenischia. Part of the town is on the slopes of the Rocciamelone.
