= Cellarengo =

- Comune
- Comune di Cellarengo
- Coat of arms

- Location within Italy Location within Piedmont
- Coordinates: 44°52′N 7°57′E
- Country: Italy
- Region: Piedmont
- Province: Asti (AT)

Government
  - Mayor: Adriana Bucco

Area
  - Total: 10.8 km^{2} (4.2 sq mi)
- Elevation: 321 m (1,053 ft)

Population (31 May 2007)
  - Total: 677
  - Density: 62.7/km^{2} (162/sq mi)
- Demonym: Cellarenghesi
- Time zone: UTC+1 (CET)
  - Summer (DST): UTC+2 (CEST)
- Postal code: 14010
- Dialing code: 0141

Cellarengo is a comune (municipality) in the Province of Asti in the Italian region Piedmont, located about 30 kilometres (19 mi) southeast of Turin and about 20 kilometres (12 mi) west of Asti.

Cellarengo borders the following municipalities: Isolabella, Montà, Poirino, Pralormo, and Valfenera.
