= Villanova d'Asti =

- Comune
- Comune di Villanova d'Asti
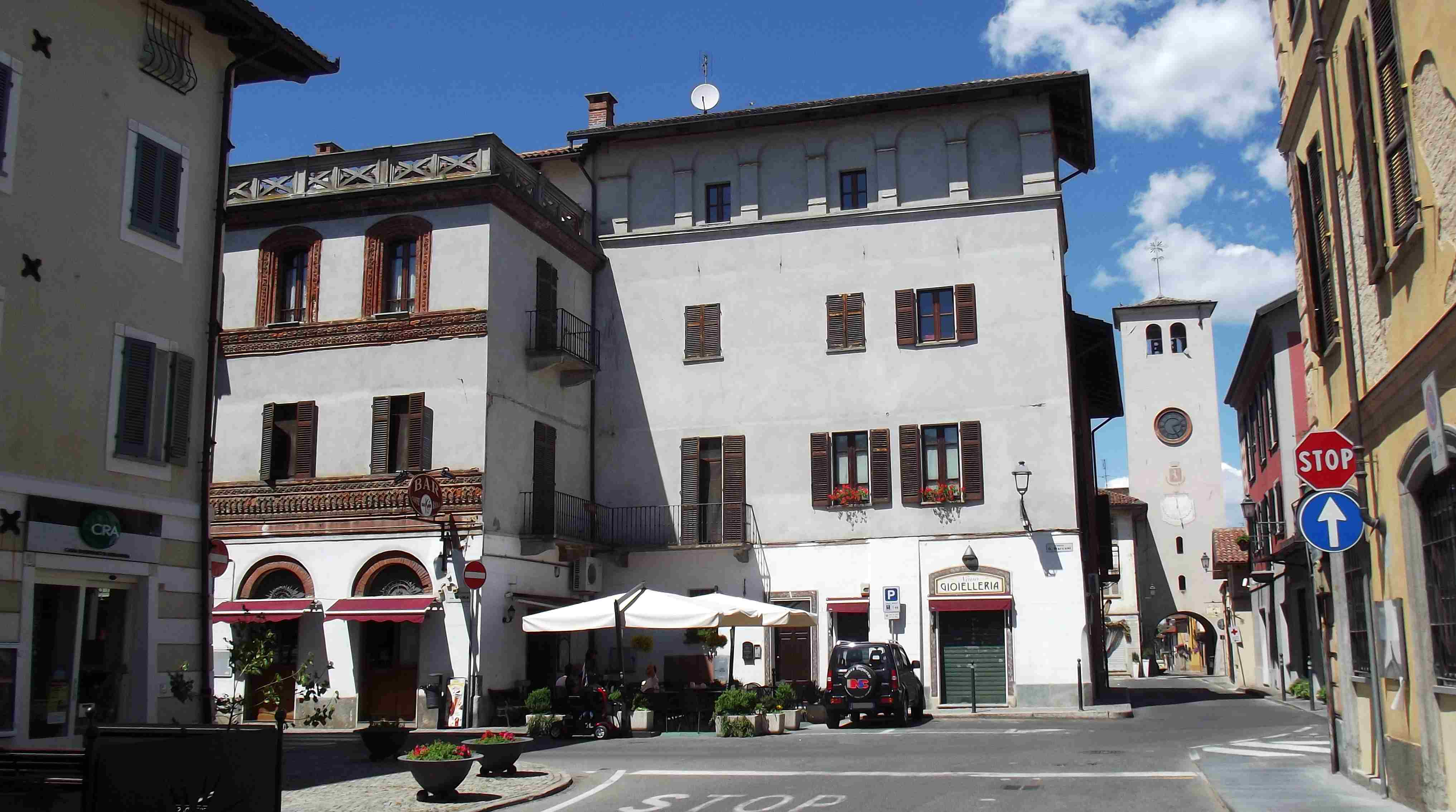

- Coat of arms

- Location within Italy Location within Piedmont
- Coordinates: 44°56′34″N 7°56′18″E
- Country: Italy
- Region: Piedmont
- Province: Province of Asti (AT)
- Frazioni: Savi, Stazione

Government
  - Mayor: Christian Giordano

Area
  - Total: 41.95 km^{2} (16.20 sq mi)
- Elevation: 260 m (850 ft)

Population (1 January 2014)
  - Total: 5,845
  - Density: 139.3/km^{2} (360.9/sq mi)
- Demonym: Villanovesi
- Time zone: UTC+1 (CET)
  - Summer (DST): UTC+2 (CEST)
- Postal code: 14019
- Dialing code: 0141
- Patron saint: St. Isidore
- Saint day: September 4
- Website: Official website

Villanova d'Asti is a town and comune in the province of Asti, Piedmont, northern Italy. It has around 5,000 inhabitants. The economy is based on a mixture of agriculture and industry.

Villanova d'Asti was founded in the Middle Ages.

The main sight is the sanctuary of the Beata Vergine delle Grazie

== Twin towns ==
Villanova d'Asti is twinned with:

- Châteaurenard, France, since 1994
- Santa Clara de Saguier, Argentina, since 2012
