= Canon regular =

Roman Catholic priests living in community under a religious rule

The Canons Regular are Catholic priests and religious brothers (canons) who live in community under a rule (Latin: regula and κανών, kanon, in Greek) and are generally organised into religious orders, differing from both secular canons and other forms of religious life, such as clerics regular, designated by a partly similar terminology. As religious communities, they have lay brothers as part of the community. Canons regular generally follow the Rule of Saint Augustine.

At times, the life of canons regular has been very popular. In 12th-century England, there were more houses of canons (often referred to as an abbey or canonry) than monasteries of monks.

== Preliminary distinctions ==
All canons regular are to be distinguished from secular canons who belong to a resident group of priests but who do not take public vows and are not governed in whatever elements of life they lead in common by a historical rule. One obvious place where such groups of priests are required is at a cathedral, where there were many Masses to celebrate and the Divine Office to be prayed together in community. Other groups were established at other churches which at some period in their history had been considered major churches, and (often thanks to particular benefactions) also in smaller centres.

As a norm, canons regular live together in communities that take public vows. Their early communities took vows of common property and stability. As a later development, they now usually take the three public vows of chastity, poverty and obedience, although some orders or congregations of canons regular have retained the vow of stability.

By 1125 hundreds of communities of canons had sprung up in Western Europe. Usually, they were quite independent of one another and varied in their ministries. For example, the Arrouaisians had restrained lifestyles along Cistercian lines, while the Premonstratensians were more austere.

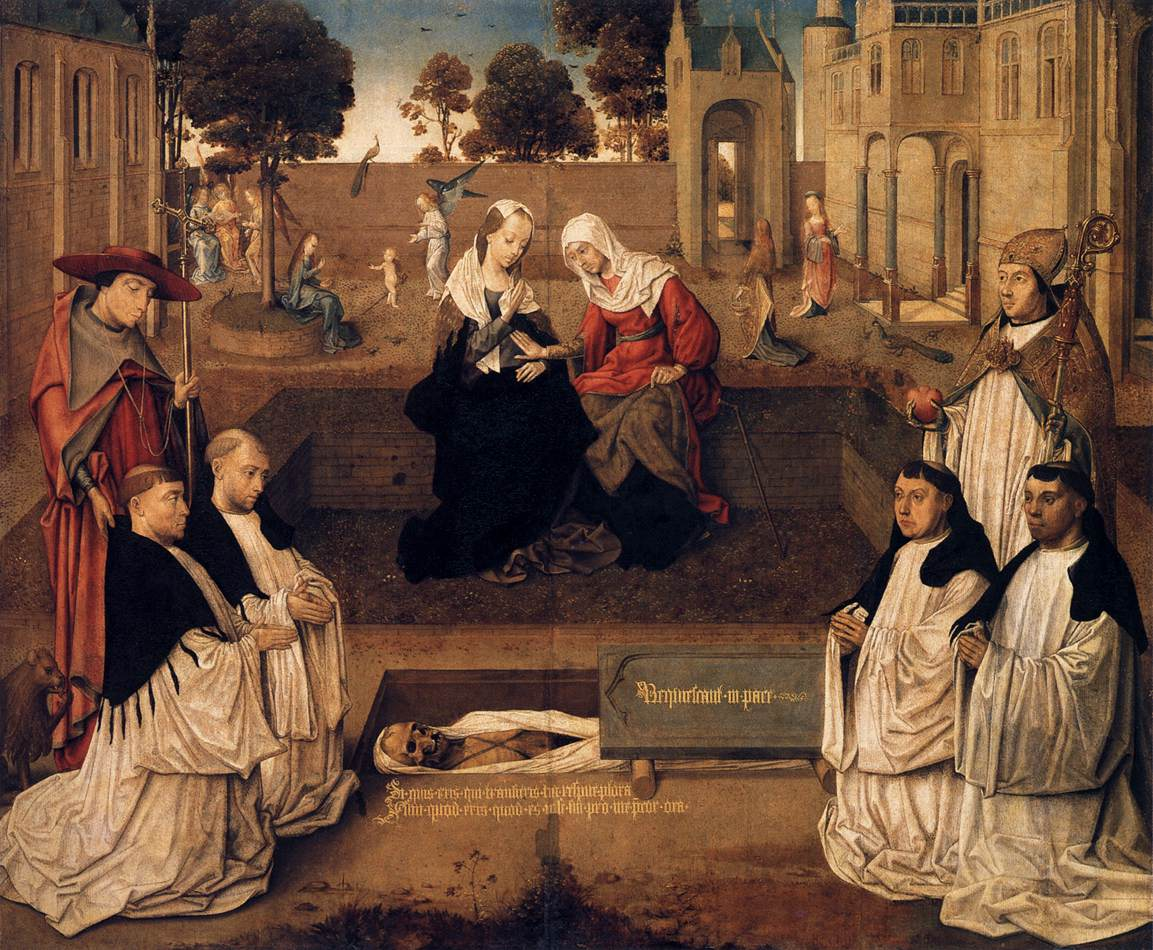
Visitation memento mori, painter unknown, c.1500, juxtaposing pregnancy and death, with four Augustinan canons regular of the Chapter (Abbey) of Sion. Left, with little lion, is Jerome; right, holding a heart, is Augustine. Rijksmuseum

Especially from the 11th century, among the canons regular, various groupings called congregations were formed, which partly resembled religious orders in the general modern sense. This movement parallelled in some respects the kind of bonds established between houses of monks. Among these congregations of canons regular, most adopted the Rule of St. Augustine, hence taking their name from St. Augustine, the great Doctor of the Church, "for he realized in an ideal way the common life of the Clergy". They became known as Augustinian Canons, and sometimes in English as Austin Canons (Austin being a form of Augustine). Where it was the case, they have also been known as Black Canons, from their black habits. There have always been canons regular who have not adopted the Rule of St. Augustine: all Augustinian Canons are canons regular, but not all canons regular are Augustinian Canons.

In Latin, terms such as Canonici Regulares Ordinis S. Augustini (Canons Regular of the Order of St. Augustine) were used, whereby the term order (Latin ordo) referred more to a form of life or a stratum of society, reminiscent of the usage of the equestrian order or senatorial order of Roman society, rather than to a religious order in the modern sense of a closely organized body. Furthermore, among the Augustinian Canons, some groups acquired a greater degree of distinctiveness in their style of life and organization, to the point of being in law or in effect autonomous religious orders. Examples include the Premonstratensian or Norbertine Order, sometimes known in English as White Canons, from their white habits. Yet another such order is that of the Crosiers. Encouraged by the general policies of the Holy See, especially from the late nineteenth century, some of these separate orders and congregations of Augustinian Canons have subsequently combined in some form of federation or confederation.

All the different varieties of canons regular are to be distinguished not only from secular canons but also from:

- Monks, who in the Western tradition are members of monastic religious orders such as the various branches of Benedictines, or the Carthusians, whose members in their history have often been laymen, not priests.

Writing at a time before the foundation of the mendicant orders (friars), Pope Urban II (died 1099), said there were two forms of religious life: the monastic (like the Benedictines and Cistercians) and the canonical (like the Augustinian Canons). He likened the monks to the role of Mary, and the canons to that of her sister, Martha.

- The Friars of Saint Augustine, sometimes called simply Augustinians or in English Augustinian friars or Austin friars, who are one of the mendicant orders. The mendicants are called "friars", not "monks" nor "canons" and were originally itinerant preachers like the Franciscans or Dominicans, living on what the people gave them in food and alms. The Augustinian friars were a galaxy of dispersed religious groups, many of them hermits who in the 13th century were formed by the popes and church councils into a religious order with structures that followed the model of the mendicant orders. The Augustinian friars drew their inspiration from the ancient and flexible Rule of St. Augustine, hence their name. However, they did not combine this with the structures or manner of life of the canons regular.
- Clerks regular (clerics regular) are for the greater part priests who take religious vows and have an active apostolic life. While they live in communities, they belong to the order as such rather than to a particular house and their prime focus is on pastoral work rather than a choral office. In the modern sense they are a category of priests of male religious orders constituted from the 16th century, examples being the Theatines or the Barnabites.

== Background ==
According to St. Thomas Aquinas, a canon regular is essentially a religious cleric. "The Order of Canons Regular is necessarily constituted by religious clerics, because they are essentially destined to those works which relate to the Divine Mysteries, whereas it is not so with the Monastic Orders." This is what constitutes a canon regular and what distinguishes him from a monk. The clerical state is essential to the Order of Canons Regular, whereas it is only accidental to the Monastic Order. Erasmus, himself a canon regular, declared that the canons regular are a "median point" between the monks and the secular clergy. The outer appearance and observances of the canons regular can seem very similar to those of the monks. This is because the various reforms borrowed certain practices from the monks for the use of the canons.

According to St. Augustine, a canon regular professes two things, "sanctitatem et clericatum". He lives in community, he leads the life of a religious, he sings the praises of God by the daily recitation of the Divine Office in choir; but at the same time, at the bidding of his superiors, he is prepared to follow the example of the Apostles by preaching, teaching, and the administration of the sacraments, or by giving hospitality to pilgrims and travellers, and tending the sick. In fact, traditionally canons regular have not confined themselves exclusively to the functions of the canonical life. They have also given hospitality to pilgrims and travelers on the Great St. Bernard and on the Simplon, and in former times the hospitals of St. Bartholomew's Smithfield, in London, of Santo Spirito, in Rome, of Lochleven, Monymusk and St. Andrew's, in Scotland, and others like them, were all served by canons regular. Many houses of canons worked among the poor, the lepers, and the infirm. The clerics established by St. Patrick in Ireland had accommodation for pilgrims and the sick whom they tended by day and by night. And the rule given by Chrodegang to his canons enjoined that there should be a hospital near their house for this purpose.

== History ==
=== Ordo Antiquus ===
Augustine of Hippo (354–430), also known as Saint Augustine, did not found the canons regular, not even those who are called Augustinian Canons. Although Augustine of Hippo is regarded by the canons as their founder, Vincent of Beauvais, Sigebert, and Peter of Cluny all state that the canonical order traces back its origin to the earliest ages of the Church. In the first centuries after Christ, priests lived with the bishop and carried out the liturgy and sacraments in the cathedral church. While each could own his own property, they lived together and shared common meals and a common dormitory.

From the 4th to the middle of the 11th century, communities of canons were established exclusively by bishops. The oldest form of canonical life was known as "Ordo Antiquus". In Italy, among the first to successfully unite the clerical state with the common life was St Eusebius, Bishop of Vercelli and St Zeno, Bishop of Verona and St Ambrose of Milan did similarly.

==== Saint Augustine ====
It was under St Augustine that the "canonical life" reached its apotheosis. None of the Fathers of the Church were as enthusiastic about the community life of the Apostolic Church of Jerusalem (Acts 4:31–35) or as enthralled by it as St. Augustine. To live this out in the midst of like-minded brethren was the goal of his monastic foundations in Thagaste, in the "Garden Monastery" at Hippo and at his bishop's house. The "rules" of St. Augustine intended to help put the vita apostolica into effect for the circumstances of his time and the community of his day.

From the time of his elevation to be Bishop of Hippo in 395 AD, he transformed his episcopal residence into a monastery for clerics and established the essential characteristics-the common life with renunciation of private property, chastity, obedience, the liturgical life and the care of souls: to these can be added two other typically Augustinian characteristics —a close bond of brotherly affection and a wise moderation in all things. This spirit permeates the whole of the so-called Rule of St. Augustine and at least in substance can be attributed to Augustine personally.

The invasion of Africa by the Vandals destroyed Augustine's foundation, which likely took refuge in Gaul. The prescriptions which St. Augustine had given to the clerics who lived with him soon spread and were adopted by other communities of canons regular not only in Africa, but in Italy, in France and elsewhere. Pope Gelasius, about the year 492, re-established the regular life in the Archbasilica of Saint John Lateran. From there the reform spread till at length the rule was universally adopted by almost all the canons regular.

==== Chrodegang and the Rule of Aachen ====
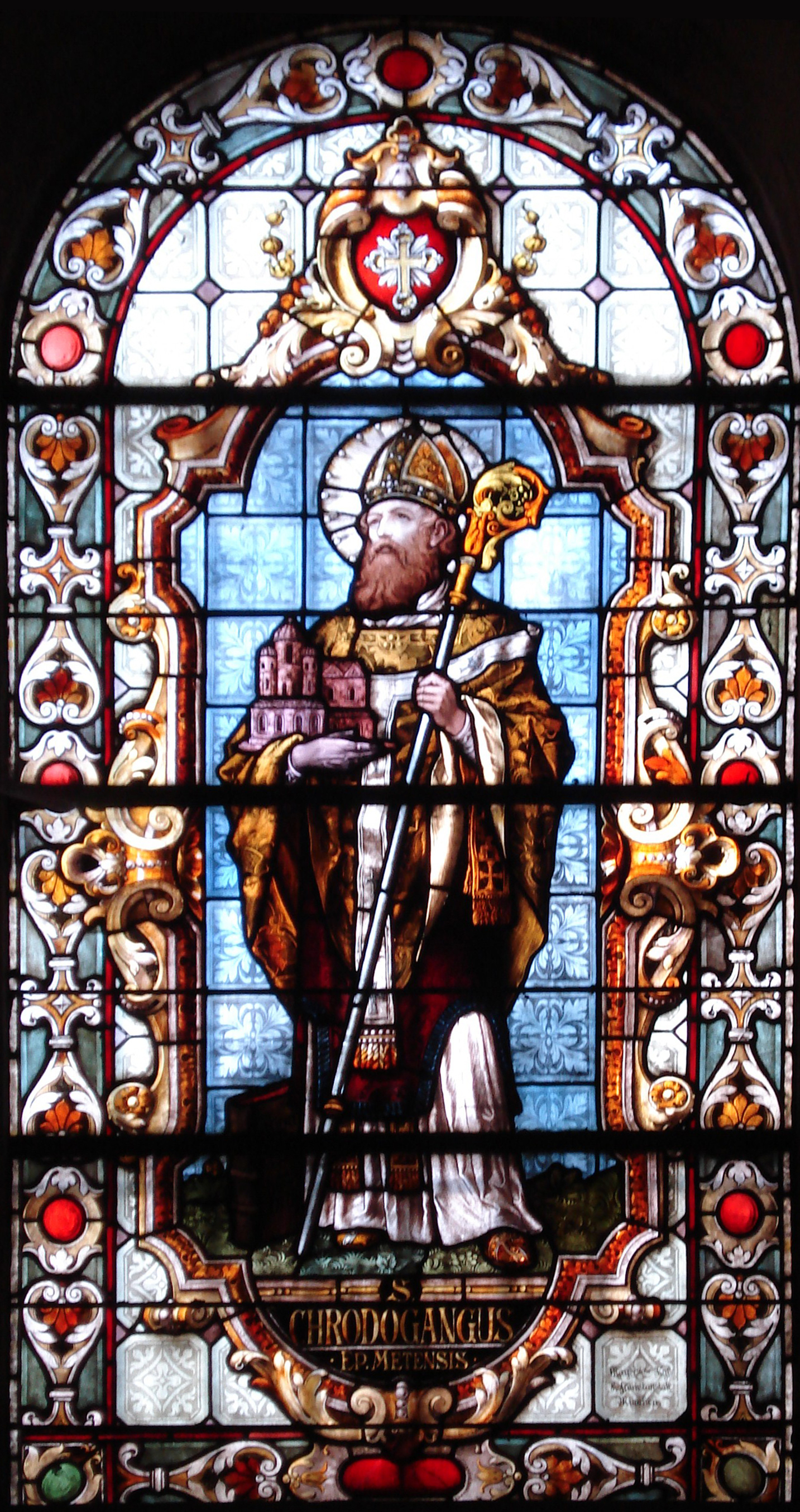
Bishop Chrodegang of Metz

Over time abuses crept into clerical life, including those of concubinage and independent living with the scandals and disedification of the faithful which followed. Vigorous reforms were undertaken during the reign of the Emperor Charlemagne (AD 800). Important milestones for the Ordo Antiquus form of canonical life include the reform and rule of the Benedictine Bishop of Metz, Chrodegang (763), and the Synods of Aachen (816–819), which established a rule of life for canons in the Carolingian Empire.

The ecclesiastical constitution or ordinance of Chrodegang, the Regula vitae communis (Rule of Common Life), was at once a restoration and an adaptation of the Rule of St. Augustine, and its chief provisions were that the ecclesiastics who adopted it had to live in common under the Bishop's roof, recite common prayers, perform a certain amount of manual labour, keep silence at certain times, and go to confession twice a year. They did not take the vow of poverty and they could hold a life interest in property. Twice a day they met to hear a chapter from the rule of their founder, hence the meeting itself was soon called "chapter". This discipline was also recommended shortly after by the Councils of Aachen (Aix-la-Chapelle) (789) and Mainz (813).

In 816 the Institutio canonicorum Aquisgranensis was drawn up at the Council of Aachen. This included a rule of 147 articles, known as the Rule of Aix-la-Chapelle, to be applied to all canons. These statues were held as binding. The principal difference between Chrodegang's Rule and that of Aachen was their attitude toward private property. Both permitted the canons to own and dispose of property as they saw fit, but while Chrodegang counselled a renunciation of private property, the Aachen Synod did not, since this was not part of the tradition of the canons. It is from this period that there dates the daily recitation by the canons of the Divine Office or canonical hours.

=== Reforms ===
In the 9th, 10th, and 11th centuries, laxity crept in: community life was no longer strictly observed, the sources of revenue were divided and the portions were allocated directly to the individual canons. This soon led to differences of income, and consequently to avarice, covetousness, and the partial destruction of the canonical life.

In the 11th century the life of canons regular was reformed and renewed, chiefly owing to the efforts of Hildebrand of Sovana (c. 1020–1085), later Pope Gregory VII, culminating in the Lateran Synod of 1059. Here for the first time the Apostolic See officially recognized and approved the manner of life of the religious clergy as founded by bishops and others. Gregory VII's reform resulted in a distinction being made between clerics who lived in separate houses and those who still preserved the old discipline.

Toward the end of the 11th century, the more cathedral and other chapters of canons opted for the apostolic life after the example of St. Augustine, the more urgent became both a separation from worldly life and measures regarding those canons who held to private ownership, in contradistinction to Benedictine monasticism, which till then was the mainstay of the Gregorian Reform. Pope Urban II deserves the credit for having recognized the way of life of the "canonici regulares" as sharply distinguished from the principles of the "canonici saeculares", and at the same time as a way of communal perfection equal to monasticism. In granting numerous privileges to reformed houses of canons he clearly emphasized the nature and goal, the rights and duties of the canons regular. Thus from the renewal of the canonical life there inevitably arose a new "order"—which initially had not been the intention. The privileges of Pope Urban II are the first to officially use the name Canonici secundum regulam sancti Augustini viventes, which would give the new ordo of canonical life a distinctive stamp.

The norm of life of the canons regular was concretized from the last third of the 11th century by a general following of the vita apostolica and the vita communis of the early Church based more and more on the precepts handed down by Augustine. Secundum regulam Augustini vivere, an expression first employed in Rheims in 1067, signified a life according to the example of Augustine as was known from his numerous writings.

From that time the Order of Canons Regular of Saint Augustine, as it was already beginning to be called, increased rapidly. A great number of congregations of canons regular sprang into existence, each with its own distinctive constitutions, grounded on the Rule of St. Augustine and the statutes which Blessed Peter de Honestis gave to his canons at Ravenna about the year 1100. In some houses the canonical life was combined with hospitality to travelers, nursing the sick and other charitable works. Often a number of houses were grouped together in a congregation. One of the most famous houses was the Abbey of Saint Victor, founded in Paris in 1108, celebrated for its liturgy, pastoral work and spirituality. Also worth mention are the Abbey of Saint Maurice of Agaune, the Hospice of Saint Bernard of Mont Joux in Switzerland, and the Austrian Abbeys.

The high point of the canons regular can be situated in the first half of the 12th century. During this time they contributed series of popes – Honorius II, Innocent II, Lucius II, as well as Hadrian IV shortly after mid-century and finally Gregory VIII in the second half of the century.

In the Middle Ages, some cathedrals were given over to the care of canons regular, as were certain places of pilgrimage. The shrine of Our Lady of Walsingham in England was just such a shrine, and the cathedrals of Saint John Lateran in Rome, Salzburg and Gurk in Austria, Toledo and Saragossa in Spain, St. Andrew's in Scotland, were among many others to be reformed by canons regular. The canons also took a leading role in the intellectual life of the Church by founding cathedral and collegiate schools throughout Europe. For example, the University of Paris finds part of its ancestry in the famous Abbey school of St. Victor.

Later, congregations properly so called, governed by a superior general, were established within the order so as to maintain uniformity of particular observances. Among these congregations, which gave new life to the order, were the Windesheim Congregation, whose spirituality (known as the "Devotio Moderna") had a wide influence. During the 15th and 16th centuries the Lateran Congregation added to the Order's luster by its spirituality and scholarship. In the 17th and 18th centuries the French Congregation of Saint Genevieve and later the Congregation of Our Savior founded by Saint Peter Fourier (1566–1640), responded to new needs by combining the religious life with pastoral work. Finally, in the 19th century Adrien Grea (1828–1917), founder of the Congregation of the Immaculate Conception, in his writing put in its proper perspective the ecclesial dimension of the canonical life.

In their independence and their local character, the canons regular had some resemblance to the Benedictine monks, as they did in their maintaining the vow of stability to a particular house. The individual houses often have differences in the form of the habit, even within the same congregation.

Already in the Middle Ages canons regular were engaged in missionary work. Saint Vicelin (c. 1090 – 1154) took the Gospel to the pagan Slavs of Lower Germany; his disciple Meinhard (died 1196) evangelized the people of eastern Livonia. In the 16th century the Portuguese Congregation of Saint John the Baptist took the good news of salvation to the Congo, Ethiopia and India. At the general chapter of the Lateran Congregation held at Ravenna in 1558, at the request of many Spanish canons, Don Francis de Agala, a professed canon regular from Spain, who for some ten years had already laboured in the newly discovered country, was created vicar-general in America, with powers to gather into communities all the members of the canonical institute who were then dispersed in those parts, and the obligation to report to the authorities of the order. Especially from the 19th century onwards, the order has undertaken the work of evangelization.

=== Ordo Novus ===
By the 13th century, there was widespread adherence to the Rule of St. Augustine. This came in piecemeal fashion. There were in fact three different rules of St. Augustine from which to choose:

- Regularis informatio or Regula sororum: Often considered to be the oldest rule of St. Augustine, it was composed for a convent of nuns and attached to Letter 211. Its content and style is very close to the Praecepta.
- Ordo Monasterii or Regula secunda: This may have been a preface to the Praecepta, but it is unclear whether it is from the hand of St. Augustine or not. It is stricter than the Praecepta and differs in style, tone and vocabulary.
- Praecepta or Regula tertia: While this may in fact be the oldest of the three rules, the Praecepta clearly belongs to the Augustinian corpus. Its spirit and content are clearly Augustinian and fits his other writings on the common life.

==== England ====
Of all the new monastic and religious groups to settle in the British Isles in the course of the 12th century the canons regular, known there as the "Black Canons", were the most prolific. At the heart of their existence was the vita apostolica, but even more than other groups the canons regular became involved in active spiritual care of local populations. Perhaps as a result of this feature they also enjoyed sustained support from founders, patrons and benefactors, and new foundations continued to be made long after the main force of the expansion of the monastic orders had declined.

In England, in the 12th century there was a great revival of canons regular, in the wake of various congregations newly found in France, Italy and the Low countries, some of them reaching England following the Norman invasion. In England alone, from the Norman Conquest to the death of Henry II, no fewer than fifty-four houses of canons regular were founded. The first of these was at Colchester in 1096, followed by Holy Trinity, Aldgate, in London, established by Queen Matilda, in 1108. From 1147, Andrew of St. Victor served as abbot of the newly founded abbey at Wigmore. The first General Chapter of the Augustinian Canons in England, intended to regulate the affairs of the Order, took place in 1217.

In the 12th century the Canons Regular of the Lateran established a priory in Bodmin. This became the largest religious house in Cornwall. The priory was suppressed on 27 February 1538. In England houses of canons were more numerous than Benedictine monasteries. The Black Death left the canons regular seriously decimated, and they never quite recovered. In the early stages of the Dissolution of the Monasteries under Henry VIII several larger monasteries converted to colleges of canons. Between 1538 and 1540, the canonical houses were suppressed, and the religious dispersed, according to Cardinal Gasquet's computation, ninety-one houses in all.

In the early 20th century, the canons regular were represented in England by the Premonstratensians at Crowley, Manchester, Spalding and Storrington and currently Chelmsford; the Canons Regular of the Lateran Congregation at Bodmin, Truro, St Ives, and Newquay, in Cornwall; at Spetisbury and Swanage, in Dorsetshire; at Stroud Green and Eltham, in London; the Canons Regular of the Immaculate Conception at Epping, Harlow, Milton Keynes, Daventry and now Luton. Besides the occupations of the regular life at home and the public recitation of the Divine Office in choir, they are chiefly employed in parish ministry, preaching retreats, supplying for priests who ask their service, and hearing confessions, either as ordinary or extraordinary confessors to convents or other religious communities.

==== Scotland ====
The Anglo-Saxon Chronicle dated to 565 A.D., relates that Columba, Masspreost (Mass-Priest), "came to the Picts to convert them to Christ". St Columba (Columbanus, Colmcille) was the disciple of St. Finnian, who was a follower of St. Patrick. Both Columba and Finnian embraced the regular life which Patrick had established in Ireland. Tradition places the first landing of Columba on leaving Ireland at Oronsay, and Fordun (Bower) notices the island as "Hornsey, ubi est monasterium nigrorum Canonicorum, quod fundavit S. Columba" (where is the monastery of Black Canons which St. Columba founded), though this is clearly anachronistic. According to Smith and Ratcliff there was a homogeneity among the Augustinian houses in Scotland before 1215 which had much to do with King David I who gave them a common economic policy, and Robert, Bishop of St Andrews, himself a former Augustinian canon at the Priory of St. Oswalds, at Nostell and the founding prior of Scone, united the houses of canons through his patronage and by engaging them as his advisors.

At the time of the Reformation the chief houses were:

- Scone, founded by King Alexander I of Scotland. Tradition says that the Culdees were at Scone before Alexander brought canons regular from Nostall Priory in 1115.
- St. Andrews, the Metropolitan see of Scotland, founded by Angus, King of the Picts. The church was at first served by Culdees, but in 1144 Bishop Robert, former Augustinian prior of Scone, established there members of his own order. The prior was mitred and could pontificate.
- Holyrood, which King David I founded in 1128 for canons regular.

Many of the houses which claimed to have been founded by St. Columba remained in the possession of canons regular till the Reformation, including Oronsay and an alleged foundation at an unidentified locality in the Western Isles named as Crusay.

==== Ireland ====
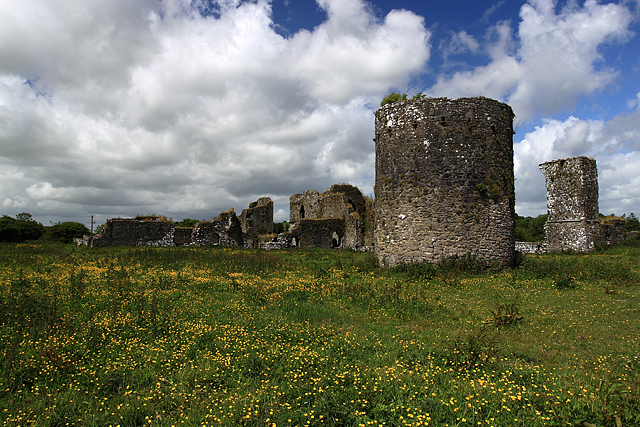
Ballybeg Priory, founded in 1229 by Philip de Barry for the Canons Regular of St Augustine

The Augustinian canons regular established 116 religious houses in Ireland in the period of church reform early in the 12th century. The role of the Augustinian Canons within the population was the main reason for their being the largest single order in Ireland. The canons regular did not practise the isolation from the general population operated by the Cistercians, and participated in a great variety of pastoral activities in parishes, hospitals and schools, as permitted by the Rule of St. Augustine. The revival also counteracted the decline of religious discipline which had set in among Irish monasteries. St Malachy, archbishop of Armagh, was a prime mover in the reform movement in the Irish Church in the 12th century and by the time of his death in 1148, there were forty-one Augustinian houses.

It is not improbable that at the outbreak of the dissolution by Henry VIII, some of the Irish canons regular retired to houses abroad. By 1646 the Irish canons regular on the Continent were sufficiently numerous to be formed by Innocent X into a separate "Congregation of St. Patrick", which the pope declared to inherit all the rights, privileges and possessions of the old Irish canons. In the year 1698 the Irish Congregation, by a Bull of Pope Innocent XII, was affiliated and aggregated to the Lateran Congregation.

== Present-day organization ==
Like the Order of St. Benedict, it is not one legal body, but a union of various independent congregations.

=== Canons Regular of Saint Augustine ===
The Canons Regular of Saint Augustine (C.R.S.A. or Can.Reg.), also referred to as "Augustinian Canons" or "Austin Canons" ('Austin' being an anglicisation of 'Augustine'), is one of the oldest Latin Church orders. In contrast to many other orders of the Catholic Church, that of the Augustinian Canons (Canons Regular of St. Augustine, Canonici Regulares Sancti Augustini, CRSA) cannot be traced back to an individual founder or to a particular founding group. They are more the result of a process that lasted for centuries. Because of their manifold roots they have assumed various forms in medieval and modern Europe.

Though they also follow the Rule of St. Augustine, they differ from the friars in not committing themselves to corporate poverty, which is a defining element of the mendicant orders. Unlike the friars and like monks, the canons are generally organized as one large community to which they are attached for life with a vow of stability. Their houses are given the title of an abbey, from which the canons then tend to various surrounding towns and villages for spiritual services. The religious superior of their major houses is titled an abbot. Smaller communities are headed by a prior or provost.

The distinctive habit of canons regular is the rochet, worn over a cassock or tunic, which is indicative of their clerical origins. This has evolved in various ways among different congregations, from wearing the full rochet to the wearing of a white tunic and scapular.

=== Confederation ===
On 4 May 1959 Pope John XXIII founded the Confederation of the Canons Regular of St. Augustine with his apostolic letter "Caritatis Unitas" on the 900th anniversary of the First Lateran Synod. The Confederation is a "union of charity" which binds nine congregations of canons regular together for mutual aid and support. The initial four congregations were:

- The Canons Regular of the Lateran, officially styled "Congregatio SS. Salvatoris Lateranensis", takes its origin from the Roman Archbasilica of Saint John Lateran, the pope's own cathedral. Pope Sylvester I established in the basilica clergy living in common after the manner of the Primitive Church. In the year 492, Gelasius, a disciple of St. Augustine, introduced in the patriarchal basilica the regular discipline which he had learnt at Hippo. At the request of St. Peter Damian, Alexander II, called some canons from St. Frigidian at Lucca a house of strict observance, to the Lateran. The reform spread, till at length the houses that had embrace it were formed into one large congregation. The canons regular served the Lateran Basilica until secular canons were introduced. There are houses belonging to the Lateran Congregation in Italy, Brasil, Argentina, Poland, France, Spain, the Dominican Republic and the United States of America. Their work is essentially the recitation of the Divine Office in church, the administration of the Sacraments and preaching. In Italy they have charge of parishes in Rome, Bologna, Genoa, Fano, Gubbio and elsewhere. In England they were a major force in the re-establishment of the Catholic Church there during the late 19th century, staffing many of the new parishes being established, until the number of secular clergy native to the country could be developed.
- The Congregation of St. Nicholas and St. Bernard of Mont Joux (Great St. Bernard, Switzerland) is representative of the hospitaller movement by which canons responded to the call to care for travelers and pilgrims. They were founded by St. Bernard of Menthon, the archdeacon of Aosta, about the year 1050, under the patronage of St. Nicholas of Myra, patron saint of travelers. Communities of canons served the poor and the sick throughout Europe, through both nursing and education. They include the canons of the Great St. Bernard Hospice at Great St. Bernard Pass in the Alps on the border of Switzerland, where they have served travelers since the mid-11th century. This community is the one which developed the familiar breed of St. Bernard to assist the canons in their ability to find travelers buried by avalanches. There are currently (2012) about 35 professed canons and lay brothers under the Abbot-Provost of the congregation, with the general administration of the congregation at Martigny, Switzerland. In addition to the original hospice, they also serve at another hospice established by their founder at the Little St. Bernard Pass. Some canons have charge of the hospice on the Simpion Pass founded at the command of Napoleon Bonaparte in 1801. They also provide pastoral care to several parishes in the Canton of Valais. The canons' past services have included a hospice in the Val d'Aosta which they administered from 1991 to 2011. Due to their unique position as a Swiss congregation and their work in the heights of the Alps, a community of canons went to Tibet to form a community of native clergy, arriving there in 1936. The community had to withdraw from the country after its occupation by the People's Republic of China in 1949. One canon, Maurice Tomay, perished during the ensuring chaos in the course of his efforts to assist the Dalai Lama, when Tomay was ambushed and shot to death by a group of lamas at the Choula Pass on the Tibetan-Chinese border. He was declared a martyr for the faith and beatified by Pope John Paul II in 1993.
- The Congregation of St. Maurice of Agaunum (Canton Valais, Switzerland) is probably the oldest continuously inhabited abbey in the West. The first Bishop of Valais, St. Theodorus, founded around 370 a shrine which commemorated the martyrdom of St. Maurice and companions. In 515 King Sigismund, a convert to the Catholic faith, endowed a monastery near the shrine to St. Maurice. The life of the monks was centered on the continual choral office and became the model for monks throughout Western Europe. Charles Martel imposed one of his generals on the abbey as superior. It seems that canons replaced the monks sometimes around 820–830. These canons probably lived under the Rule of St. Chrodegang as mitigated by the Synod of Aachen, which had been held just a few years earlier at the capital of the Frankish empire. Until the middle of the 12th century, canons of the Aachen observance and Augustinian canons lived side by side, seemingly harmoniously. This was typical in many houses of the canons of the Ordo Antiquus model. As the Aachener canons died off, the community became fully "regular". On 20 July 1642, Peter IV Mauritius Odet (1640–1657) was consecrated abbot. As a reformer, he was supported vigorously by the Congregation of Our Savior, founded by St. Peter Fourier. At the opening of the 21st century, the canons continue to witness to Christ through the common life for priests and pastoral service to the Church through parish work and the secondary school run at the abbey.
- The Austrian Congregation of Canons Regular was formed in 1907, composed of the various ancient monasteries, abbeys, and collegiate churches of canons regular in Austria: St. Florian's Priory, Klosterneuburg Priory, Herzogenburg Priory, Reichersberg, Vorau and Neustift (now in Italy). The Austrian Congregation looks after scores of parishes in Austria as well as one in Norway. The Austrian congregation, as an example, wears a sarozium, a narrow band of white cloth—a vestige of the scapular—which hangs down both front and back over a cassock for their weekday wear. For more solemn occasions, they wear the rochet under a violet mozzetta.

Subsequently, other congregations of canons regular joined the confederation:

- The Windesheim Congregation (Paring, Germany) originated with Gerard Groot's, Brethren of the Common Life. A preacher and reformer of the 14th century, at Deventer in the Low Countries, many poor clerical students gathered around him and, under his direction, "putting together whatever they earned week by week, began to live in common." Groot resolved to place this new institute under the spiritual guidance of the canons regular. The execution of this resolve was left by Gerard Groot, at his death, to his disciple, Florentius Radwyn. The foundation of the first house was at Windersheim, near Zwolle. This became the mother-house of the congregation, which, only sixty years after the death of Groot, possessed in Belgium alone more than eighty monasteries, some of which, according to the chronicler John Buschius, contained as many as a hundred, or even two hundred residents. The congregation continued until the devastations of the Reformers drove it from its native soil, and it was at last utterly destroyed during the French Revolution. The revival of the congregation was proposed under the pontificate of Pope Pius XII. Permission for this was granted by Pope John XXIII in 1961. The motherhouse of the restored congregation, St. Michael's Priory is now in Paring Abbey, in Bavaria, Germany.
- Canons Regular of the Immaculate Conception (Rome, Italy) was founded in 1871 by Adrien Gréa, Vicar-General of St. Claude in France. Gréa had a vision of re-establishing the Canonical Life in France which had been brought to an end following the French Revolution, as such he is regarded as a re-founder more than a founder. The laws of separation of Church and State in France in 1904 made it difficult for most of the Canons Regular of the Immaculate Conception to stay in France. A new home was found for the congregation who moved to Italy, where it increased its base. The early period of this congregation saw missions established in Canada and Peru, where there are still houses today. The canons regular have houses in Brasil, England, France, Italy, Peru and the United States. Before their expulsion from France they served the ancient Abbey of St. Anthony in the Dauphiné. Their habit is a white cassock, with leather girdle, linen rochet, black cloak and hood, and black biretta.
- Congregation of Mary, Mother of the Redeemer (La Cotellerie, France)
- Congregation of the Brothers of the Common Life (Maria Brunnen, Germany)
- Congregation of St. Victor (Champagne, France) traces its heritage to the Victorine Canons founded in 1109 by William de Champeaux, former Archdeacon of Paris, established at the Abbey of St. Victor near the city, a school which drew students from many parts. So great was the reputation of the monastery built by William that houses were soon established everywhere after the model of St. Victor's, which was regarded as their mother-house. Numerous religious houses of canons regular were reformed by its canons. Ste. Geneviève (Paris) 1148, St. James (Wigmore, diocese of Hereford) around 1148, St. Augustine's (Bristol) 1148, St. Catherine's (Waterford) 1210, St. Thomas's (Dublin) 1192, St. Peter's (Aram, Naples) 1173 were of the number. The Monastery was destroyed during the French Revolution and the community dispersed. In the mid-20th Century, a successor congregation was founded in Champagne, France, which serves in France and Tanzania.

The abbot primate, who is elected by all the congregations and serves for a six-year term, works to foster contact and mutual cooperation among the diverse communities of canons regular in the Catholic Church. On 11 October 2016, Jean-Michel Girard, Abbot of the Congregation of St. Nicholas and St. Bernard of Mont Joux (Great St. Bernard, Switzerland) was elected as the 10th abbot primate of the Confederation of the Canons Regular of St Augustine.

The order has houses in Argentina, Austria, Brazil, Canada, the Czech Republic, the Dominican Republic, England, Italy, France, Belgium, Germany, the Netherlands, Norway, Poland, Peru, Porto Rico, Spain, Taiwan, Switzerland, the United States and Uruguay.

== Other orders ==
Other orders sprang up which followed the Rule of St. Augustine and the canonical life. As canons regular became separated into different congregations they took their names from the locality in which they lived, or from the distinctive habit they wore, or from the one who led the way in remodelling their lives. Hence the White Canons of Prémontré; the White Canons of Saint John Lateran; the Black Canons of St. Augustine; the Canons of St. Victor at Paris and also at Marseilles.

=== The Norbertines ===
The Premonstratensian Order was founded at Prémontré, near Laon, in Picardy (northern France), by St. Norbert in the year 1120. The order received formal approval from Pope Honorius II in 1126, the same year in which Norbert was appointed Archbishop of Magdeburg. According to the spirit of its founder, this congregation unites the active with the contemplative life, the institute embracing in its scope the sanctification of its members and the administration of the sacraments. It grew large even during the lifetime of its founder, and now has charge of many parishes and schools, especially in the Habsburg provinces of Austria and Hungary. The Premonstratensians wear a white habit, white biretta with white cincture. They are governed by an abbot general, vicars and visitors.

=== The Crosiers ===
The origin of the Canons Regular of the Order of the Holy Cross appears to be uncertain, although all admit its great antiquity. It has been divided into four chief branches: the Italian, the Bohemian, the Belgian and the Spanish. Of this last very little is known. The branch once flourishing in Italy, after several attempts at reformation, was finally suppressed by Alexander VII in 1656. In Bohemia there are still some houses of Crosier Canons, as they are called, who, however, seem to be different from the well known Belgian Crosiers, who trace their origin to the time of Innocent III and recognize for their Father Blessed Theodore de Celles, who founded their first house at Huy, near Liège. These Belgian Croisier Canons have a great affinity with the Dominicans. They follow the Rule of St. Augustine, and their constitutions are mainly those compiled for the Dominican Order by St. Raymond of Penafort. Besides the usual duties of canons in the church, they are engaged in preaching, administering the sacraments, and teaching. Formerly they had houses in Belgium, the Netherlands, Germany, France, England, Ireland and Scotland. Until about 1900 they also served missions in North America, they had five monasteries in Belgium, of which St. Agatha is considered the mother-house. To these Croisier Canons belongs the privilege, granted to them by Pope Leo X and confirmed by Leo XIII, of blessing beads with an indulgence of 500 days. Their habit was formerly black, but is now a white soutane with a black scapular and a cross, white and red on the breast. In choir they wear in summer the rochet with a black almuce.

=== Canons Regular of St. John Cantius ===
The Canons Regular of St. John Cantius were founded in 1998 by C. Frank Phillips, C.R., and are active in the United States and Canada, principally in the area of parish ministry.

=== Canons Regular of the New Jerusalem ===
The Canons Regular of the New Jerusalem are a congregation who solely use the preconciliar, Tridentine rites which is based in the Diocese of Wheeling-Charleston.

=== Canons Regular of St. Thomas ===
A monastery sui juris following the Rule of St. Augustine in the tradition of canons regular, and entirely devoted to the ancient Latin liturgy of the Roman rite. The idea for the community was conceived in 2012 at the invitation of Francis R. Reiss, then a Auxiliary Bishop of Detroit and received the endorsement of Allen H. Vigneron the Bishop of Detroit. In 2019 the community relocated on the invitation of Thomas Paprocki, Bishop of Springfield to establish a permanent monastery. On the Feast of St. Michael the Archangel in 2020 Bishop Paprocki formally approved the Statutes of the Canons Regular of Saint Thomas Aquinas and canonically established their residence.

== Extinct congregations ==
- Canons of the Holy Sepulchre: It is the opinion of Helyot and others that no Canons of the Holy Sepulchre existed before 1114, when some canons regular, who had adopted the Rule of St. Augustine, were brought from the West and introduced into the Holy City by Godfrey of Bouillon. On the other hand, Suarez and others recognize the tradition of the order, which maintains that Saint James, the first Bishop of Jerusalem, established clerics living in common in the Holy City, where also, after the crusades, flourished the "Congregation of the Holy Sepulchre". After the fall of Jerusalem to Saladin, the canons sought refuge in Europe, where they had monasteries, in Italy, France, Spain, Poland and the Low Countries. In Italy they seem to have been suppressed by Innocent VIII, who, in 1489, transferred all their property to the Knights of Malta. The rest continued to exist until the French Revolution. The men's congregation is now extinct, but is still represented by the Sepulchrine Canonesses, who have convents in Belgium, the Netherlands, Spain and England.
- The Gallican Congregation developed from the Canons of St. Victor in 1149. This group was established at the Sainte-Geneviève Abbey, which in its turn became very numerous and, reformed as the Gallican Congregation, in the 16th century, by a holy man called Charles Faure; and had, at the outbreak of the French Revolution, no fewer than one hundred abbeys and monasteries in France.
- The Gilbertines were founded by St. Gilbert of Sempringham. It was the only religious order of distinctly English origin. Having completed his studies in England and in France, he returned to the diocese of Lincoln, where he became a parish priest. At first he established a small community of enclosed, contemplative nuns, assisted by lay sisters. To this were added lay brothers to work the land, and later canons to serve the community and assist with administration. Gilbert tried to associate his order with the Cistercians, who refused to accept them and advised him to produce his own Rule. The monasteries were largely double houses of male and female religious (with strictly separate quarters), with some houses for men alone. A great friend of Ss. Aelred and Bernard, Gilbert composed his Rule drawing on Cistercian, Premonstratensian and Benedictine models, but used the Rule of St. Augustine for his male religious. The Gilbertine Order spread especially in the North of England, and at the time of the general Dissolution of the Monasteries, it had twenty houses and one hundred and fifty-one religious. Unusually it was the prioress of the monastery who was the actual superior of the house, with a Master General elected by the male and female superiors in General Chapter.

Extinct congregations also include the Order of Saint Rufus, founded in 1039, and once flourishing in Dauphiné; that of Aroasia (Diocese of Arras, in France), founded in 1097; Marbach (1100); of the Holy Redeemer of Bologna, also called the Renana (1136), now united to the Lateran Congregation; of the Holy Spirit in Sassia (1198); of St. George in Alga, at Venice (1404); of Our Saviour in Lorraine, reformed in 1628 by St. Peter Fourier.

== Canonesses regular ==
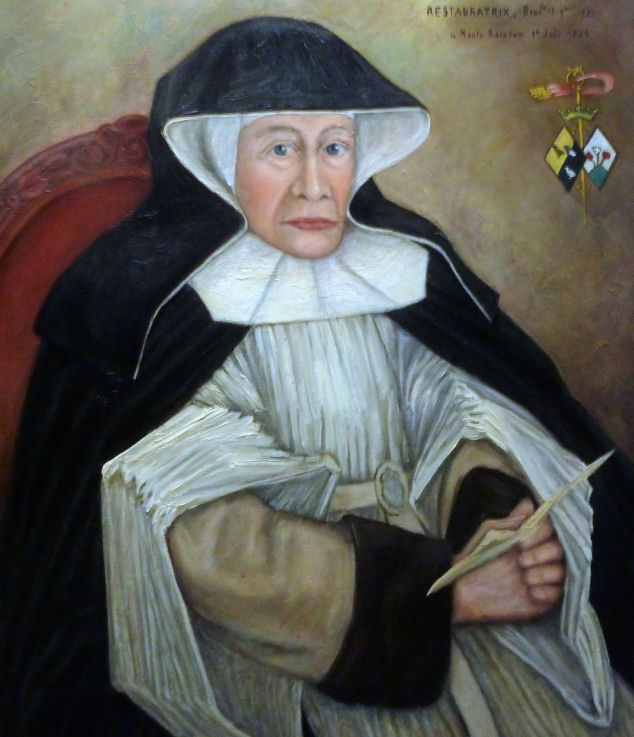
Abbess Joanna van Doorselaer de ten Ryen, Waasmunster Roosenberg Abbey.

As well as canons regular, there are also canonesses regular, the claim of an origin in the Apostolic Age being common to both. Communities of canonesses regular developed from the groups of women who took the name and the Rule of life laid down for the various congregations of canons regular. As with regard to origin and antiquity the same is to be said of orders of women both in general and in particular as of orders of men. St. Basil in his rules addresses both men and women. Augustine of Hippo drew up the first general rule for communities of women in the year 423.

The occupations of the canonesses down the centuries has consisted in the recitation of the Divine Office, the care of the church vestments, and the education of the young, often particularly the daughters of the nobility. For the most part, the canonesses regular follow the Rule of St. Augustine.

Some congregations still extant include:

- Congrégation de Notre-Dame de chanoinesses de Saint Augustin, instituted in 1597.
- Canonesses Regular of the Holy Sepulchre founded in the 14th century as a branch of the Canons Regular of the Holy Sepulchre.
- Canonesses of St Victor d'Ypres who trace their foundation to William de Champeaux, founder of the Congregation of St Victor of Paris (Victorines), (1108).
- Augustinian Canonesses of the Mercy of Jesus have their roots in a group who, more than 700 years ago, began serving the needy and distressed in the expanding French fishing port of Dieppe.
- Canonesses Regular of St Augustine Windesheim Congregation tracing its origin to Louvain, 1415. St Ursula's, Louvain, was one of the first women's communities sprung from Windesheim (founded 1387).

== Influence ==
Among the orders which sprang from the canonical life were the Order of Preachers or Dominicans, as well as the Order of the Most Holy Trinity, or Trinitarians. St. Anthony of Padua started his religious life as a canon regular in Portugal before becoming a Franciscan friar. St. Bruno was originally a canon living under the Rule of Aachen for over 20 years when, at the age of 51, he and several companions founded a new community at the Grande Chartreuse, and founded the Carthusian Order.

== Saints, Blesseds, and other holy people from its various Congregations ==
Saints

- Bernard de Menthon (c. 923 - c. June 1008), founder of the Canons Regular of the Hospitaller Congregation of Great Saint Bernard, canonized on 9 August 1681
- Ivo de Chartres (1040 – 23 December 1115), Bishop of Chartres from the Canons Regular of Saint Augustine, canonized on 18 December 1570
- Guiraud (c. 1070 – 5 November 1123), Bishop of Béziers from the Canons Regular of Cassan Abbey
- Bertrand de Comminges (c. 1050 - c. 1126), Bishop of Comminges from the Canons Regular of Saint Augustine, canonized in 1220
- Norbert of Xanten (c. 1075 – 6 June 1134), Archbishop of Magdeburg and founder of the Order of Canons Regular of Premontre (Premonstratensian Order), canonized on 28 July 1582
- Gaucherius (c. 1060 - c. 1140), professed priest of the Canons Regular of Saint Augustine, canonized in c. 1194
- Kjeld of Viborg (c. 1100 - c. 1150), professed priest of the Canons Regular of Saint Augustine, canonized in c. 1188
- Vicelinus (c. 1086 - 12 December 1154), Bishop of Oldenburg from the Canons Regular of Saint Augustine
- Guarino Foscari de Palestrina (c. 1080 - 6 February 1158), Cardinal-Bishop of Palestrina from the Canons Regular of Saint Augustine, canonized in 1159
- Ubaldo Baldassini di Gubbio (c. 1084 - 16 May 1160), Bishop of Gubbio from the Canons Regular of Saint Augustine, canonized on 4 March 1192
- Teotonio de Coimbra (c. 1082 - 18 February 1162), royal councilor and the first prior of the Monastery of the Holy Cross in Coimbra, and founder of the Order of the Canons Regular of the Holy Cross, canonized in 1613
- Lorcán Ua Tuathail (1128 – 14 November 1180), Archbishop of Dublin from the Canons Regular of Arrouaise, canonized on 11 December 1225
- Gilbert of Sempringham (c. 1085 – 4 February 1189), founder of the Gilbertine Canons Regular, canonized in 1202
- Thorlak Thorhallsson (c. 1133 – 23 December 1193), Bishop of Skálholt from the Canons Regular of Saint Victor, canonized on 14 January 1984
- Meinhard of Riga (c. 1130 - 12 October 1196), Bishop of Latvia from the Canons Regular of Saint Augustine, canonized on 8 September 1993
- William Tempier (died 29 March 1197), professed priest from the Canons Regular of Saint Augustine who prudently and firmly governed the Diocese of Poitiers and defending it against the oppression of nobles
- Martin de Leon (c. 1130 – 12 January 1203), professed priest of the Canons Regular of Saint Augustine, canonized on 12 December 1959
- Vilhelm from Æbelholt (c. 1125 - 6 April 1203), professed priest of the Canons Regular of St. Victor, canonized on 21 January 1224
- Albert of Vercelli (c. 1149 – 14 September 1214), Patriarch of Jerusalem from the Canons Regular of the Holy Cross
- Aldebrando da Fossombrone (1119 – 30 April 1219), Bishop of Fossombrone from the Canons Regular of Saint Augustine
- Fulk of Pavia (c. 1164 - 26 October 1229), Bishop of Pavia from the Canons Regular of Sant'Eufemia
- John Thwing of Bridlington (c. 1320 – 10 October 1379), professed priest of the Canons Regular of Saint Augustine of Bridlington Priory, canonized on 24 September 1401
- Lorenzo Giustiniani (1 July 1381 – 8 January 1456), Patriarch of Venice from the Canons Regular of San Giorgio in Alga, canonized on 16 October 1690
- Pedro de Arbués (c. 1441 – 17 September 1485), professed priest of the Canons Regular of Saint Augustine, martyred by conversos during the Spanish Inquisition, canonized on 29 June 1867
- Stanisław Sołtys [Kazimierczyk] (27 September 1433 – 3 May 1489), Polish professed priest of the Canons Regular of the Lateran, canonized on 17 October 2010
- Joannes [Jan] Lenaerts van Oisterwijk (c. 1504 - 9 July 1572), Dutch professed priest of the Canons Regular of Saint Augustine, martyred by Calvinists in Gorkum, canonized on 29 June 1867
- Caterina Tomàs i Gallard de Palma (1 May 1531 - 5 April 1574), mystic from the Canonesses Regular of Saint Augustine, canonized on 22 June 1930
- Pierre Fourier (30 November 1565 – 9 December 1640), professed priest of the Canons Regular of Chaumousey, founder of the Canonesses of Saint-Augustin of the Notre-Dame Congregation together with Bl. Alix Le Clerc, canonized on 27 May 1897

Blesseds

- Olegario Bonestruga (c. 1060 – 6 March 1137), Archbishop of Tarragona from the (now extinct) Order of Saint Rufus, beatified on 25 May 1675
- Hartmann of Brixen (1090 - 23 December 1164), Bishop of Brixen from the Canons Regular of Saint Augustine, beatified on 11 February 1784
- Ponce de Faucigny (c. 1100 - 26 November 1178), professed priest of the Canons Regular of Abondance, beatified on 15 December 1896
- Bonifacio di Valperga (died 25 April 1243), Bishop of Aosta from the Canons Regular of Saint Augustine, beatified on 28 April 1890
- Emerico di Quart (c. 1250 - 1 September 1313), Bishop of Aosta from the Canons Regular of Saint Augustine, beatified on 14 July 1881
- Jan van Ruusbroec (c. 1293/1294 – 2 December 1381), Dutch mystic and professed priest from the Canons Regular of Saint Augustine, beatified on 9 December 1908
- Louis Aleman (c. February 1390 – 16 September 1450), Archbishop of Arles and Cardinal from the now-extinct Canons Regular of Saint Joseph, beatified on 9 April 1527.
- Michał Giedroyć (c. 1420 - 4 May 1485), priest of the (now extinct) Canons Regular of the Penance of the Blessed Martyrs, beatified on 7 November 2018
- Arcangelo Canetoli (c. 1460 - 16 April 1513), professed priest of the Canons Regular of Santa Maria di Reno, beatified on 2 October 1748
- Alix Le Clerc (2 February 1576 – 9 January 1622), founder of the Canonesses of Saint-Augustin of the Notre-Dame Congregation alongside St. Pierre Fourier, beatified on 4 May 1947
- Alain de Solminihac (25 November 1593 – 31 December 1659), Bishop of Cahors from the (now extinct) Canons Regular of Saint Augustine of Chancelade, beatified on 4 October 1981
- Marie-Catherine de Saint-Augustin (3 May 1632 – 8 May 1668), French missionary to Canada from the Canonesses Regular of Saint Augustine, beatified on 23 April 1989
- Jean-Charles-Marie Bernard du Cornillet (4 August 1759 – 3 September 1792), professed priest from the Canons Regular of Saint Victor, martyred during the French Revolution, beatified on 17 October 1926
- Jean-François Bonnel de Pradal (5 September 1738 – 3 September 1792), professed priest from the Canons Regular of the Congregation of France, martyred during the French Revolution, beatified on 17 October 1926
- Claude Ponse (c. 1729 – 3 September 1792), professed priest from the Canons Regular of the Congregation of France, martyred during the French Revolution, beatified on 17 October 1926
- Marie Lhullier (18 November 1744 - 25 June 1794), professed religious from the Augustinian Sisters of the Mercy of Jesus, martyred during the French Revolution, beatified on 19 June 1955
- Gabriel Pergaud (29 October 1752 - 21 July 1794), professed priest from the Canons Regular of the Congregation of France, martyred during the French Revolution, beatified on 1 October 1995
- Anne Catherine Emmerich (8 September 1774 – 9 February 1824), professed religious from the Canonesses Regular of Saint Augustine (Windesheim Congregation), beatified on 3 October 2004
- Maurice Tornay (31 August 1910 – 11 August 1949), professed priest from the Canons Regular of Saint Augustine, martyred in Tibet, beatified on 16 May 1993

Declared Blessed by popular acclaim

- Pietro degli Onesti (c. 1050 – 29 March 1119), priest from the Canons Regular of Saint Augustine who built a church after a pilgrimage to the Holy Land and became the head of a house of Canons Regular next to the church
- Jean I de Warneton (died 27 January 1130), Bishop of Therouanne from the Canons Regular of Saint Augustine
- Miro de Tagamanent (c. 1161 – c. 1161), priest from the Canons Regular of Saint Augustine in the monastery of Sant Joan de les Abadesses
- Achard of Saint Victor (c. 1100 – 29 March 1171), Bishop of Avranches from the Canons Regular of Saint Augustine
- Theodore de Celles (c. 1166 - 18 August 1236), founder of the Canons Regular of the Order of the Holy Cross
- Antonio Correr (15 July 1359 – 19 January 1445), Cardinal-Bishop of Ostia e Velletri from the Canons Regular of San Giorgio in Alga
- Maffeo Contarini (died 26 March 1460), Patriarch of Venice from the Canons Regular of San Giorgio in Alga
- Maria Arcangela Salvadori (c. 1460 – c. 1521), nun of the Canonesses Regular of Saint Lorenzo Giustiniani, who resided in the Monastery of San Daniele in Venice. She retired in the bell tower of the monastery in perpetual fasting with only bread and water
- Antonio Contarini (c. 1450 – 7 October 1524), Patriarch of Venice from the Canons Regular of Saint Augustine

Venerables

- Tommasina (Battistina) Vernazza (c. 1497 - 9 May 1587), professed religious from the Canonesses Regular of the Lateran of Saint Augustine, declared Venerable on 22 June 1972
- António of the Conception Borges da Cunha de Leytoa (2 May 1522 - 12 May 1602), Portuguese priest from the now extinct Canons Regular of Saint John the Evangelist, declared Venerable on 15 June 1834
- Giovanni Battista (Egidio) Laurent (12 September 1884 - 30 December 1941), professed religious from the Canons Regular of the Lateran, declared Venerable on 14 May 1991

Servants of God

- Ailbertus van Antoing (c. 1060 - 19 September 1122), Dutch professed priest of the Canons Regular of Saint Augustine, declared as a Servant of God in 2013
- Alexandre-Baldovin Nisse (5 May 1752 - 8 July 1793), professed priest of the Canons Regular of Saint Augustine, martyred during the French Revolution from the Archdiocese of Cambrai
- Phllibert Fraisse (c. 1725 - 1 January 1794), professed priest of the (now extinct) Canons Regular of Saint Augustine of Saint Anthony, martyred during the French Revolution from the Archdiocese of Lyon, declared as Servant of God on 20 June 2023
- Marguerite Rosalie Gouanne (c. 1768 - 10 February 1794), professed religious from the Augustinian Sisters of the Mercy of Jesus, martyred during the French Revolution from the Archdiocese of Lyon, declared as Servant of God on 20 June 2023
- Jacques-Philippe-Xavier (Augustin) Laignel (7 December 1732 - 24 April 1794), professed priest of the Canons Regular of Saint Augustine, martyred during the French Revolution from the Archdiocese of Cambrai
- Druon-Joseph Lefrançois du Fétel (24 September 1720 - 30 June 1794). professed priest of the Canons Regular of Saint Augustine, martyred during the French Revolution from the Archdiocese of Cambrai
- Anne van Derwick (26 December 1748 - 30 June 1794), professed religious from the Augustinian Sisters of the Mercy of Jesus, martyred during the French Revolution from the Archdiocese of Cambrai
- Cyprien Leblan (c. 1759 - 10 July 1794), professed priest of the Canons Regular of Saint Augustine, martyred during the French Revolution
- Yves-Jean Baptiste Delaunay (18 March 1725 - 3 August 1794), professed priest of the Canons Regular of Saint Genevieve, martyred during the French Revolution from the Archdiocese of Rennes
- Salvatore Luigi Zola (12 April 1822 - 28 April 1898), Bishop of Lecce from the Canons Regular of the Lateran
- María Dolores de los Ángeles of the Child Jesus Dávila Sestelo (8 November 1899 - 15 July 1988), professed religious from the Canonesses Regular of Saint Augustine, declared as Servant of God on 17 February 1998

== Other notable figures ==
Famous canons regular include Pope Adrian IV, Thomas à Kempis, Rutgerus Sycamber and Desiderius Erasmus.

== See also ==
- Canons Regular of Saint John Cantius
- Canons Regular of the Immaculate Conception
- Canonesses
- Canonesses Regular of the Holy Sepulchre
- Institute of Christ the King Sovereign Priest
- Congregation for Institutes of Consecrated Life and Societies of Apostolic Life
- Hendrik Mande
