= Fourneaux, Savoie =

Fourneaux
- Commune
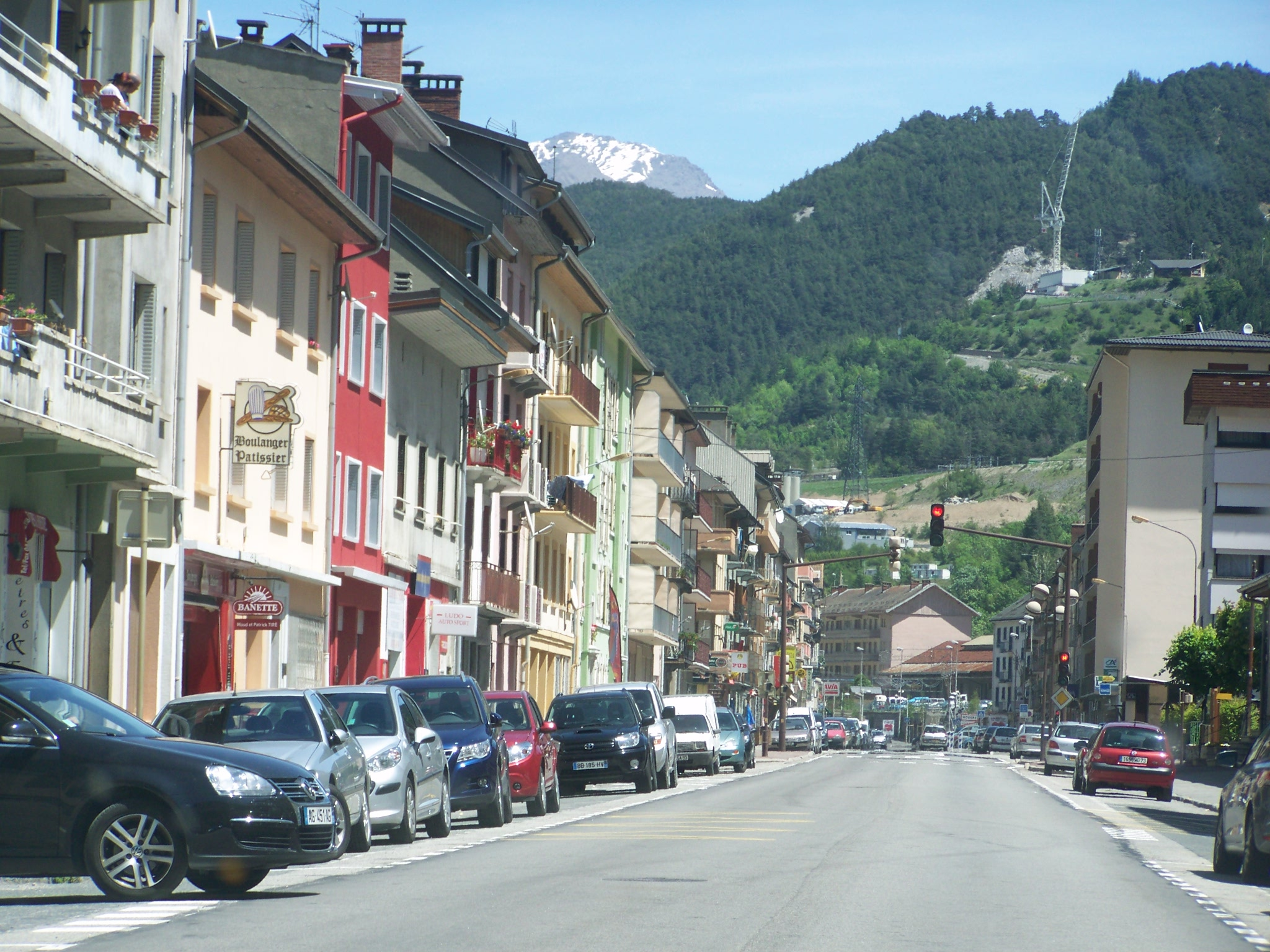
- A view within Fourneaux

- Coat of arms
- Location of Fourneaux
- Location within France Location within Auvergne-Rhône-Alpes
- Coordinates: 45°11′32″N 6°39′07″E
- Country: France
- Region: Auvergne-Rhône-Alpes
- Department: Savoie
- Arrondissement: Saint-Jean-de-Maurienne
- Canton: Modane

Government
  - Mayor (2020–2026): François Chemin
- Area^{1}: 5.04 km^{2} (1.95 sq mi)
- Highest elevation: 2,800 m (9,200 ft)
- Lowest elevation: 1,051 m (3,448 ft)
- Population (2023): 701
  - Density: 139/km^{2} (360/sq mi)
- Time zone: UTC+01:00 (CET)
  - Summer (DST): UTC+02:00 (CEST)
- INSEE/Postal code: 73117 /73500
- ^{1} French Land Register data, which excludes lakes, ponds, glaciers > 1 km^{2} (0.386 sq mi or 247 acres) and river estuaries.

Fourneaux (French pronunciation: [fuʁno]; Arpitan: Fornyo) is a commune in the Savoie department in the Auvergne-Rhône-Alpes region in south-eastern France.

== Notable people ==
- Claudio Angelo Giuseppe Calabrese, (1867–1932), bishop of Aosta

== Gallery ==
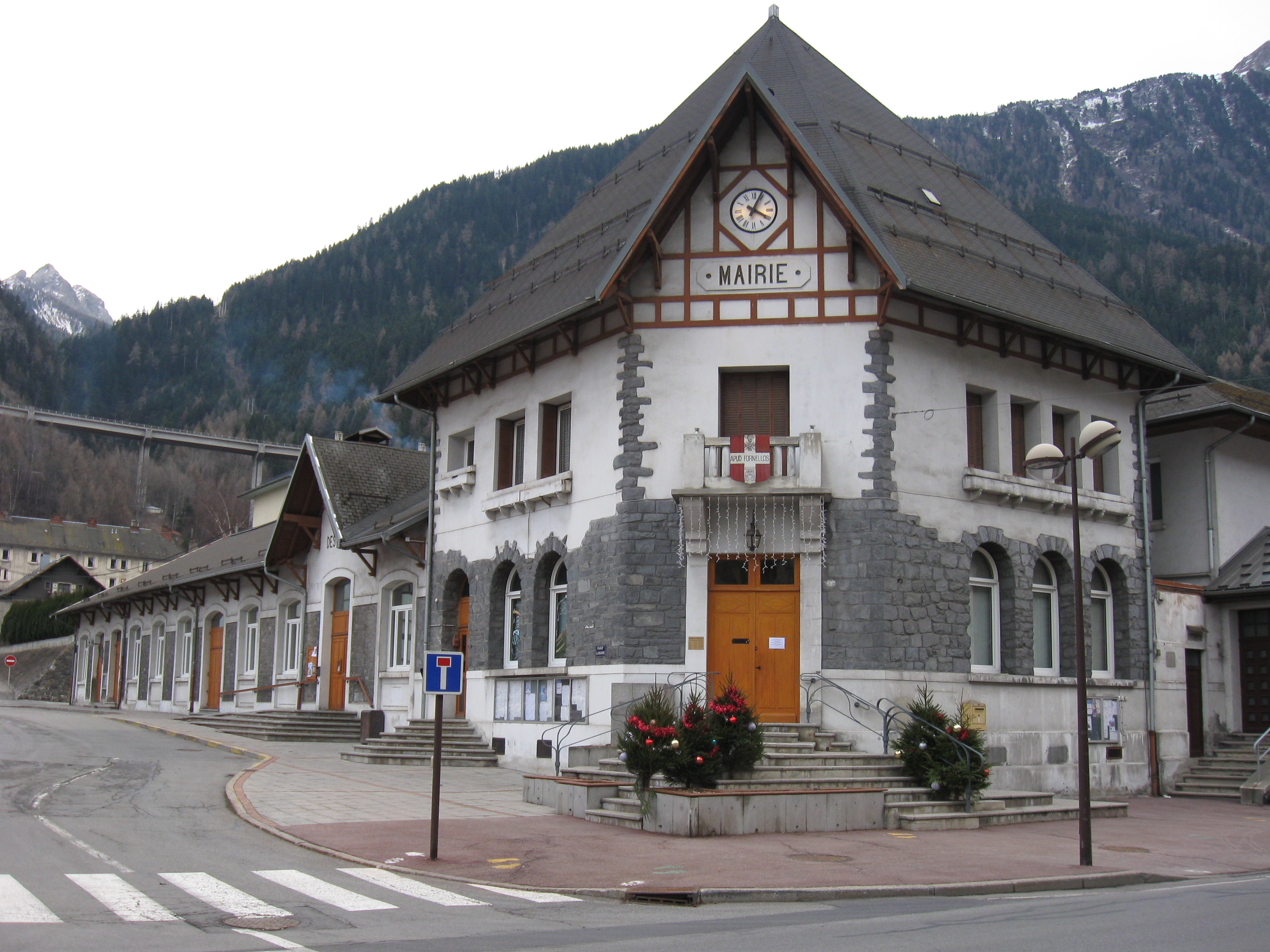
The city hall

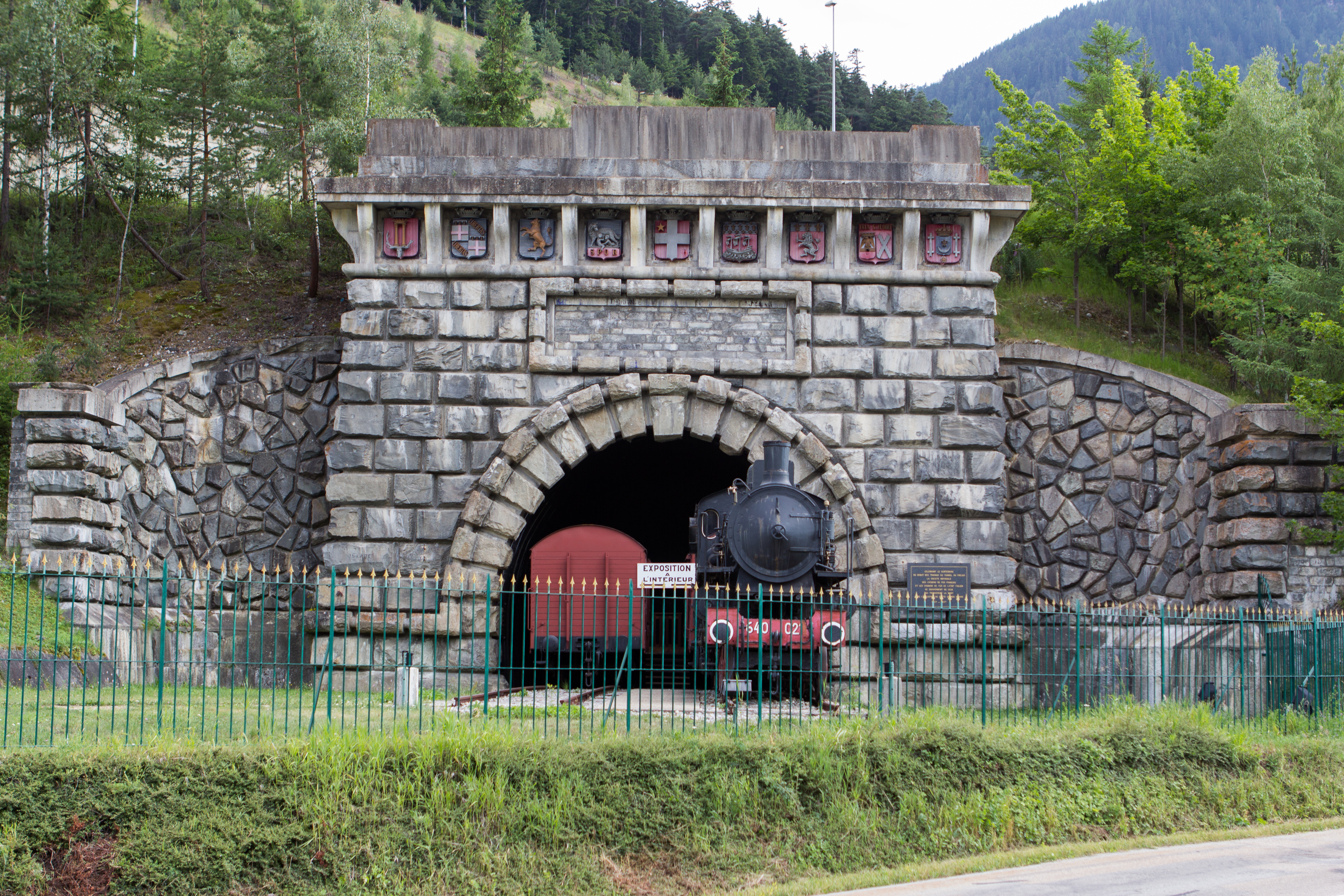
Reconstruction of the old entrance to the Mont-Cenis railway tunnel

== See also ==
- Communes of the Savoie department
