= Alexandre Lambert de Soyrier =

French Roman Catholic prelate

Most Reverend Alexandre Lambert de Soyrier
- Bishop of Ivrea
- Church: Catholic Church
- Diocese: Diocese of Ivrea
- In office: 1698–1706
- Predecessor: Giacinto Trucchi
- Successor: Giovanni Silvio Nicola

Orders
- Consecration: 30 Jun 1692 by Fabrizio Spada

Personal details
- Born: 3 April 1632 Chambery, France
- Died: 28 September 1706 (aged 74) Ivrea, Italy

Alexandre Lambert de Soyrier (3 April 1632 – 28 September 1706) was a Roman Catholic prelate who served as Bishop of Ivrea (1698–1706) and Bishop of Aosta (1692–1698).

== Biography ==
Lambert was born in Chambery. On 25 June 1692, he was appointed during the papacy of Pope Innocent XII as Bishop of Aosta. On 30 June 1692, he was consecrated bishop by Fabrizio Spada, Cardinal-Priest of San Crisogono with Michelangelo Mattei, Titular Archbishop of Hadrianopolis in Haemimonto, and Baldassare Cenci (seniore), Titular Archbishop of Larissa in Thessalia, serving as co-consecrators. On 24 November 1698, he was appointed during the papacy of Pope Innocent XII as Bishop of Ivrea. He served as Bishop of Ivrea until his death on 28 September 1706.

While bishop, he was the principal co-consecrator of Giovanni Fontana, Bishop of Cesena (1697); and Giuseppe Antonio Bertodano, Bishop of Vercelli (1697).

Catholic Church titles
Preceded by Antoine Philibert Albert Bailly B.	Bishop of Aosta; 1692–1698	Succeeded by François Amédée Milliet d'Arvillars
Preceded by Giacinto Trucchi	Bishop of Ivrea; 1698–1706	Succeeded by Giovanni Silvio Nicola
