= Claude-Ange-Joseph Calabrese =

Italian bishop

- Bishop of Aosta
- Church: Roman Catholic Church
- See: Roman Catholic Archdiocese of Vercelli
- In office: 1920–1932
- Predecessor: Giovanni Vincenzo Tasso C.M.
- Successor: Francesco Imberti (bishop)

Orders
- Ordination: September 21, 1889
- Consecration: May 7, 1920 by Bishop Giuseppe Castelli

Personal details
- Born: 18 February 1867 Fourneaux, Savoy
- Died: 7 May 1932 (aged 65) Aosta, Italy
- Denomination: Roman Catholic Church
- Occupation: Bishop
- Profession: priest

Styles of Claude-Ange-Joseph Calabrese
- Reference style: His Excellency
- Spoken style: Your Excellency
- Religious style: Bishop

Claude-Ange-Joseph Calabrese (Italian: Claudio Angelo Giuseppe Calabrese; February 18, 1867 – May 7, 1932) was the Italian Bishop of the Roman Catholic Diocese of Aosta from his appointment by Pope Benedict XV on May 7, 1920, until his death on May 7, 1932.

== Biography ==
Born in Fourneaux in 1867, he was ordained priest in 1889 and became theologal canon of Susa Cathedral.

He was appointed bishop of Aosta on May 7, 1920. He died on May 7, 1932, at the age of 65.

Catholic Church titles
Preceded by Giovanni Vincenzo Tasso C.M.	Bishop of Aosta; 1920–1932	Succeeded by Francesco Imberti
