= Pierre de Sonnaz =

Roman Catholic prelate

Most Reverend Pierre de Sonnaz
- Bishop of Aosta
- Church: Catholic Church
- Diocese: Diocese of Aosta
- In office: 1399–1410
- Successor: Ogerio Moriset

Orders
- Consecration: 25 Jan 1400 by Jacques de' Cavalli

Personal details
- Died: 1410 Aosta, Italy

Pierre de Sonnaz (died 1410) was a Roman Catholic prelate who served as Bishop of Aosta (1399–1410).

== Biography ==
On 31 October 1399, Pierre de Sonnaz was appointed during the papacy of Pope Boniface IX as Bishop of Aosta. On 25 January 1400, he was consecrated bishop by Jacques de' Cavalli, Bishop of Vercelli, with Boniface della Torre, Bishop of Ivrea, serving as co-consecrators. He served as Bishop of Aosta until his death in 1410.

== External links and additional sources ==
- Cheney, David M. "Diocese of Aosta". Catholic-Hierarchy.org. (for Chronology of Bishops) ^{[self-published]}
- Chow, Gabriel. "Diocese of Aosta (Italy)". GCatholic.org. (for Chronology of Bishops) ^{[self-published]}

Catholic Church titles
Preceded by	Bishop of Aosta; 1399–1410	Succeeded by Ogerio Moriset
