= Francesco Imberti (bishop) =

Italian archbishop (1882–1967)

- Archbishop of Vercelli
- Church: Roman Catholic Church
- See: Roman Catholic Archdiocese of Vercelli
- In office: 1945–1966
- Predecessor: Giacomo Montanelli
- Successor: Albino Mensa

Orders
- Ordination: 29 June 1906
- Consecration: 11 September 1932 by Archbishop Maurilio Fossati

Personal details
- Born: 25 December 1882 Racconigi, Italy
- Died: 27 January 1967 (aged 84) Vercelli, Italy
- Denomination: Roman Catholic Church
- Occupation: Archbishop
- Profession: priest

Styles of Francesco Imberti
- Reference style: His Excellency
- Spoken style: Your Excellency
- Religious style: Archbishop

Francesco Imberti (1882–1967) was the Italian archbishop of the Roman Catholic Archdiocese of Vercelli from his appointment by Pope Pius XII on 10 October 1945 until his retirement on 5 September 1966.

== Biography ==
Born in Racconigi in 1882, he graduated in theology and was ordained priest in Turin Cathedral in 1906.

Imberti was appointed bishop of Aosta on 23 July 1932 and archbishop of Vercelli on 10 October 1945. He was council father during the four sessions of Second Vatican Council. He retired on 7 September 1966 and died on 27 January 1967 at the age of 84.

== Bibliography ==
- Giuseppe Tuninetti, In memoriam. Clero della diocesi di Torino defunto dal 1951 al 2007. Vescovi, preti e diaconi, Torino, Effatà, 2008, pp. 38–39, ISBN 9788874024537.

Catholic Church titles
Preceded by Claudio Angelo Giuseppe Calabrese	Bishop of Aosta; 1932–1945	Succeeded by Maturino Blanchet
Preceded by Giacomo Montanelli	Archbishop of Vercelli; 1945–1966	Succeeded by Albino Mensa
Preceded by Louis-Jean-Baptiste-Joseph Julliard SM	Titular Bishop of Vulturia; 1966–1967	Succeeded by Luigi Bongianino
