= Emerico di Quart =

Émeric de Quart (known in Italian as Emerico de Quart), born in the latter part of the 13th century at the castle of Quart in the Aosta Valley, was Bishop of Aosta from 1302 until his death on 1 September 1313. He is more frequently named in ancient documents as Eymericus than Emericus or even Aimericus.

== Life ==
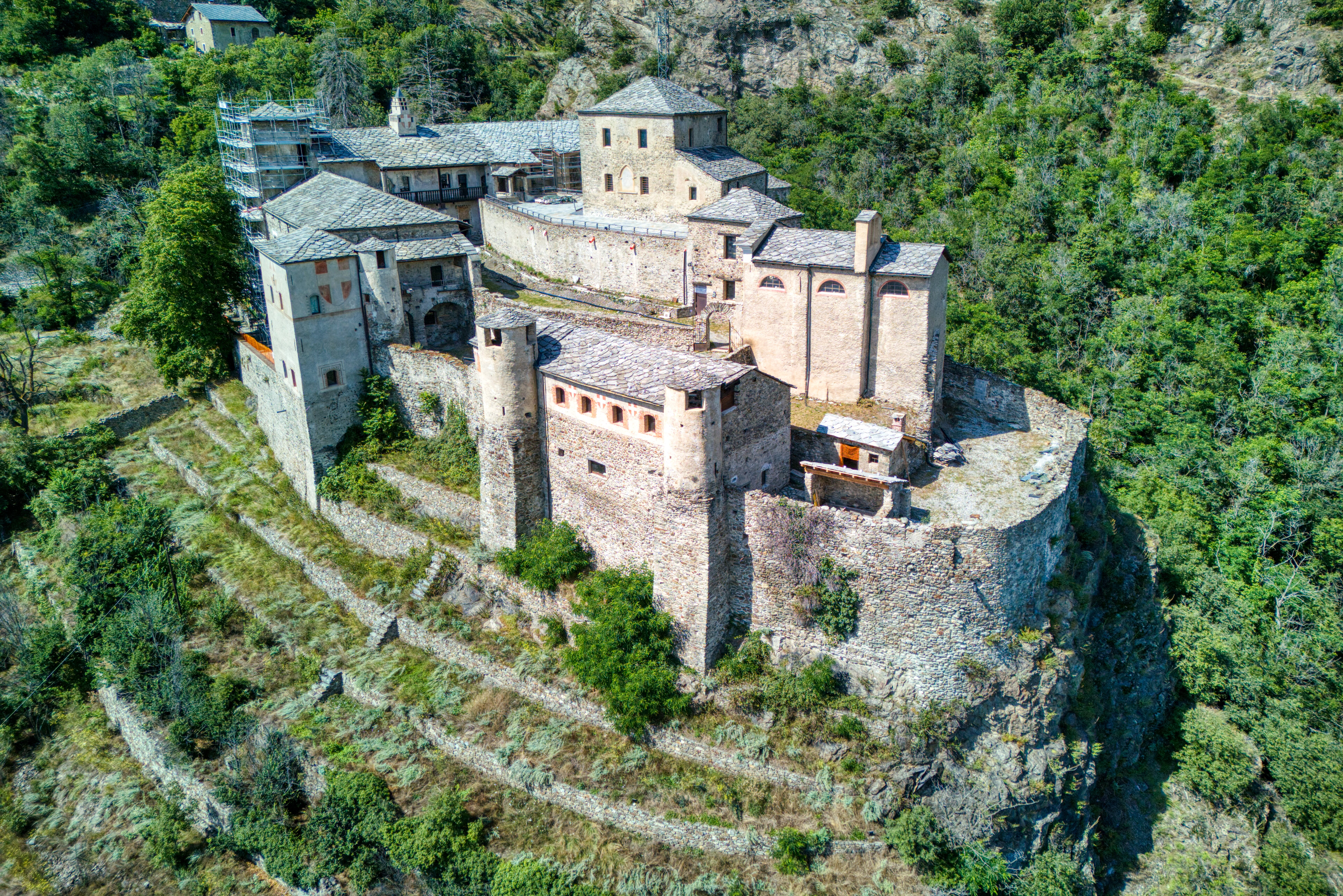
Quart Castle

Born in one of the most powerful families of Aosta Valley, Émeric or Aymeri de Quart was the son of Zacharie, known as Jacques II, lord of Quart, of the ancient and noble Aosta family « de la Porte Saint-Ours », who gave three bishops to the Diocese of Aosta. The elder brother of Émeric, Jacques III, assured the lineage while Aymon de Quart was Bishop of Geneva, and Guillaume de Quart was an archbishop. Additionally his brother Henri was provost of the Aosta Cathedral from 1288 until 1318.

After finishing theological studies, Émeric chose to live apart from his noble family as a priest in a contemplative and ascetic manner. After some years, however, he decided to join the regular canons of Aosta Cathedral.

In October 1301 he was appointed the new bishop of Aosta by all the canons of Aosta, including those of the collegiate church of Saints Peter and Ursus, and in January 1302 he was consecrated as bishop in Biella by Aimo of Challant, bishop of Vercelli.

All his biographers agree about his worthy life, his attention to poor people, his humility and devotion, but also his strength in protecting the rights of the sick and poor from the arrogance of the rich. Émeric regularly convoked the Synod of his diocesis (we better know the one of 1307), promoting the sanctity of the clergy and the laities with rigorous rules especially in items such as fastings and religious feasts. In 1311 he established the feast of the Conception of the Virgin Mary as a day of obligation.

He died on 1 September 1313 in Aosta and was buried in the chapel of Aosta Cathedral which is dedicated to the Conception of the Virgin Mary.

== Historical debate ==
Even if the majority of historians did not pay particular attention to Émeric, some traditional convictions about his life were challenged by more critical scholars. In particular it was a common point in all the ancient biographies that Émeric was a canon in the collegiate church of Sant'Orso; however, the Aostan historian Aimé-Pierre Frutaz noticed that while no cleric called Emericus was mentioned in documents relating to the collegiate church, on the contrary a prebendary called Emericus figured in the cathedral's records.

== Veneration ==
Veneration of Emericus seems to be very ancient: there is evidence of it in an illuminated picture dated 1498 where a Dominican friar is painted in the act of veneration of Emericus with a halo.

He is venerated as Blessed in the Catholic Church, his long-standing cultus having been confirmed by Pope Leo XIII in 1881.

== Sources ==
Little is known about Émeric, in particular about the period that preceded his appointment as bishop and there are no known texts personally written by him. The most ancient sources are very short summaries about the date of his death and his pious donations contained in Aostan necrologies until a picture appears in Aosta in 1498 showing Émeric as Blessed, invoked to cure many diseases.

The first complete biography of Émeric was written more than three hundred years after his death, around 1650, by an Aostan notary named Jean-Claude Mochet. A more historically correct biography was made in 1875 by bishop Joseph-Auguste Duc (and another in 1908 in his monumental of the Church in the Aosta Valley) who was the same who collected almost all the ancient documents relating to Émeric's episcopacy.
