= Antoine Philibert Albert Bailly =

Antoine Philibert Albert Bailly B.
- Bishop of Aosta
- Church: Roman Catholic Church
- See: Diocese of Tarentaise
- In office: 1659–1691
- Predecessor: Philibert Milliet de Faverges C.R.L.
- Successor: Alexandre Lambert de Soyrier

Orders
- Ordination: 1635
- Consecration: March 9, 1659 by Archbishop Giulio Cesare Bergera

Personal details
- Born: 1 March 1605 Grésy-sur-Aix, FR
- Died: 3 April 1691 (aged 86) Aosta, IT
- Denomination: Roman Catholic Church
- Occupation: Bishop
- Profession: priest

Styles of Antoine Philibert Albert Bailly
- Reference style: His Excellency
- Spoken style: Your Excellency
- Religious style: Bishop

Antoine Philibert Albert Bailly (1 March 1605 – 3 April 1691) was a Savoyard clergyman who was bishop of Aosta from 1659 until his death.

== Biography ==
Born in 1605 to Barthélémy Balli and Béatrix de Loziano, he studied with the Jesuites of Chambéry and after he moved to Turin, where he became secretary of Victor Amadeus I, Duke of Savoy. He became a Barnabite priest in 1633.

He was ordained as a bishop in March 1659.

Although not a native of the Aosta Valley, Bailly remains, as a devoted defender of local freedoms, a cultural and historical figure of the valley. He is considered by Lin Colliard as "the best and the most prolific Valdôtain writer of the time" and Rosanna Gorris stated that "the most important writer of Valdôtain 17th century literature is certainly Albert Bailly, bishop of Aosta".

== Bibliography ==
- J.-M. Albini (1865). Memoire historique sur Philibert-Albert Bally Evêque d'Aoste et Comte de Cogne au dix-septième siècle (in French). Turin: Imprimerie de Seb. Franco et fils.

Catholic Church titles
Preceded by Philibert Milliet de Faverges C.R.L.	Bishop of Aosta; 1659–1691	Succeeded by Alexandre Lambert de Soyrier
