= Franco Lovignana =

- Bishop of Diocese of Aosta
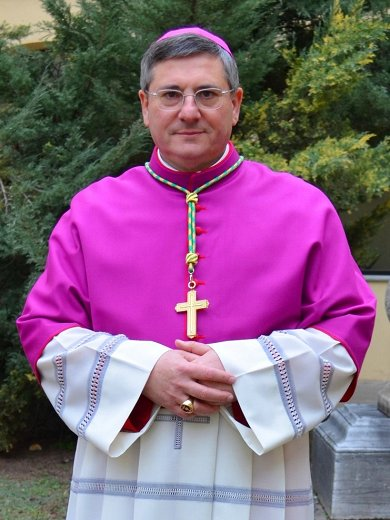
- Church: Roman Catholic Church
- See: Diocese of Aosta
- In office: 2011 – present
- Predecessor: Giuseppe Anfossi

Orders
- Ordination: 21 June 1980 by Bishop Ovidio Lari
- Consecration: 18 December 2011 by Archbishop Cesare Nosiglia

Personal details
- Born: 22 November 1957 Aosta
- Coat of arms

Styles of Franco Lovignana
- Reference style: The Most Reverend
- Spoken style: Your Excellency
- Religious style: Monsignor
- Posthumous style: none

Franco Lovignana (born 22 November 1957) is the bishop of the Roman Catholic Diocese of Aosta. He is the first native-bishop of Aosta since 1968.

== Biography ==
He entered the seminary in Aosta in 1971 and was ordained priest in 1981. In 1983 he obtained a degree in Sacred Theology at the Pontifical University of St. Thomas Aquinas.

From October 1984 to 2005, he was a professor of theology at the seminary of Aosta. Since October 1995, he was the episcopal vicar for the pastoral and canonic of collegiate of Saints Peter and Ursus of Aosta since 29 April 2003, prior of the same church. Since 2004 he was appointed vicar general of the diocese of Aosta.

== Resources ==
- Profile of Mons. Lovignana on Catholic-Hierarchy
- Official page of diocese of Aosta

Preceded by Giuseppe Anfossi	Bishop of Aosta; 1994–2011 –	Succeeded by –
