= Giuseppe Anfossi =

Italian bishop

- Emerit Bishop of Diocese of Aosta
- Church: Roman Catholic Church
- See: Diocese of Aosta
- In office: 1994 - 2011
- Predecessor: Ovidio Lari
- Successor: Franco Lovignana

Orders
- Ordination: 28 June 1959
- Consecration: 22 January 1995 by Cardinal Giovanni Saldarini

Personal details
- Born: 7 March 1935 (age 91) Marebbe, Bolzano

Styles of Giuseppe Anfossi
- Reference style: The Most Reverend
- Spoken style: Your Excellency
- Religious style: Monsignor
- Posthumous style: none

Giuseppe Anfossi (born 7 March 1935) is the Bishop Emeritus of the Roman Catholic Diocese of Aosta, having served from 1994 to 2011.

== Biography ==
He was ordained priest on 1959. He was appointed bishop of Aosta on 30 December 1994. He was consecrated on 22 January 1995 by cardinal Giovanni Saldarini, replacing the previous bishop Ovidio Lari.

As bishop of Aosta he received in the diocese for the traditional summer holidays in Les Combes d'Introd, Gran Paradiso National Park, the popes John Paul II and Benedict XVI. On St Anselm's Day, 2006, he traveled to Canterbury Cathedral in England to dedicate the new altar in St Anselm's tomb at a ceremony attended by the Archbishop of Canterbury and the abbot of Bec.

He resigned on 9 November 2011.

Preceded by Ovidio Lari	Bishop of Aosta; 1994-2011 -	Succeeded by Franco Lovignana
