= Saint-Marcel, Aosta Valley =

Saint-Marcel 'en-Mar'i (Valdôtain)
- Comune
- Comune di Saint-Marcel; Commune de Saint-Marcel
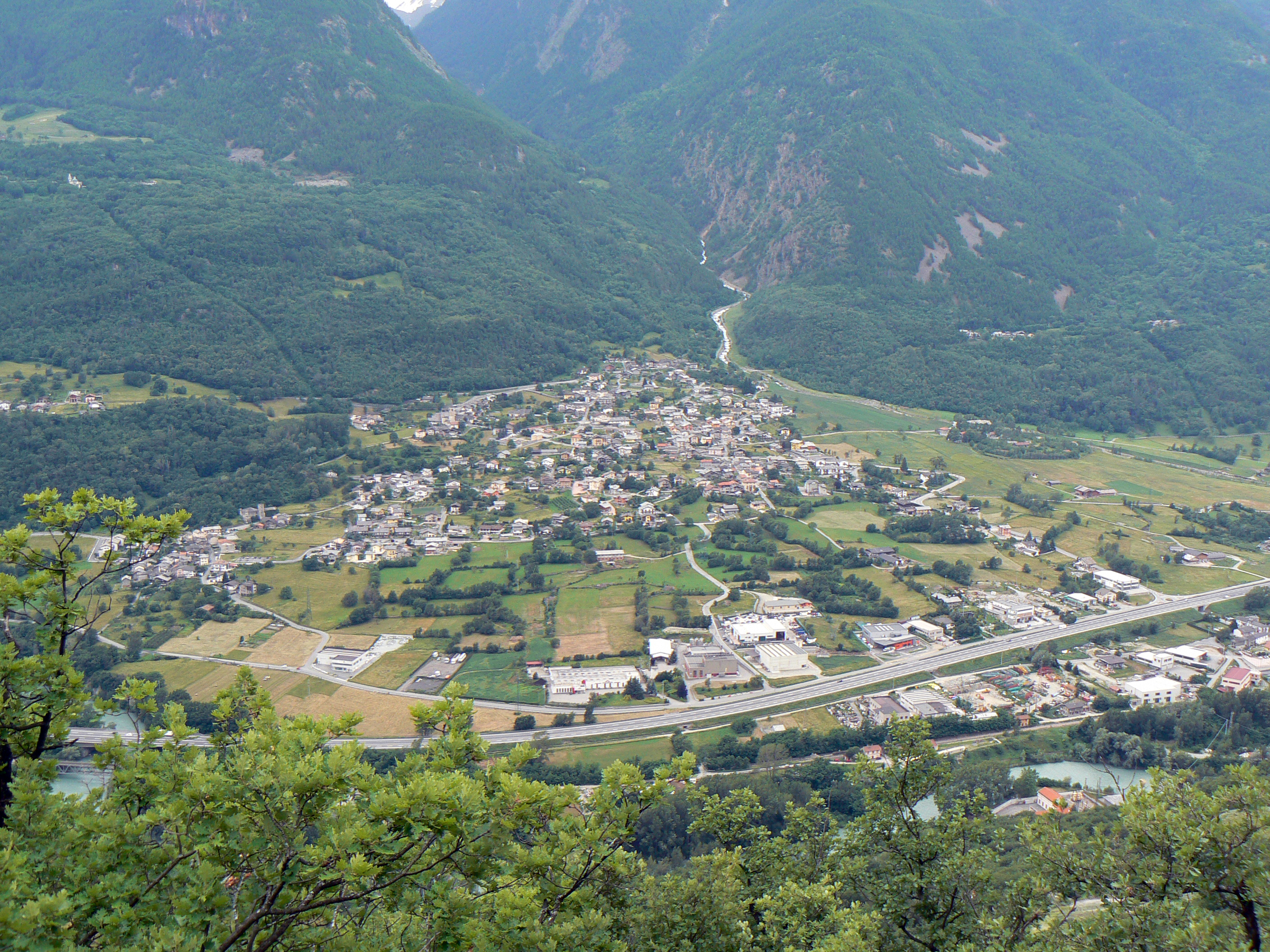

- Coat of arms

- Location within Italy Location within Aosta Valley
- Coordinates: 45°44′N 7°27′E
- Country: Italy
- Region: Aosta Valley
- Province: none
- Frazioni: Basses-Druges, Champremier, Crêtes, Druges, Enchésaz, Fontaney, Grand-Chaux, Grandjit, Layché, Mézein, Morges, Mulac, Plout, Pouriaz, Réan, Ronc, Sazaillan, Seissogne, Viplanaz, Prélaz, Prarayer, Clapey, Sinsein, Troil, Moulin, Grange

Area
  - Total: 42 km^{2} (16 sq mi)
- Elevation: 625 m (2,051 ft)

Population (31 December 2022)
  - Total: 1,311
  - Density: 31/km^{2} (81/sq mi)
- Demonym: Saint-marcelains
- Time zone: UTC+1 (CET)
  - Summer (DST): UTC+2 (CEST)
- Postal code: 11020
- Dialing code: 0165
- ISTAT code: 7060
- Patron saint: Pope Marcellus I
- Saint day: 16 January
- Website: Official website

Saint-Marcel (French: [sɛ̃ maʁsɛl]; Valdôtain: 'en Mar'i) is a town and comune in the Aosta Valley region of north-western Italy.
