= Diocese of Aosta =

Latin Catholic diocese in Italy

Coordinates: 45.7333°N 7.3167°E

Diocese of Aosta Dioecesis Augustana Italian: Diocesi di Aosta French: Diocèse d'Aoste

Catholic
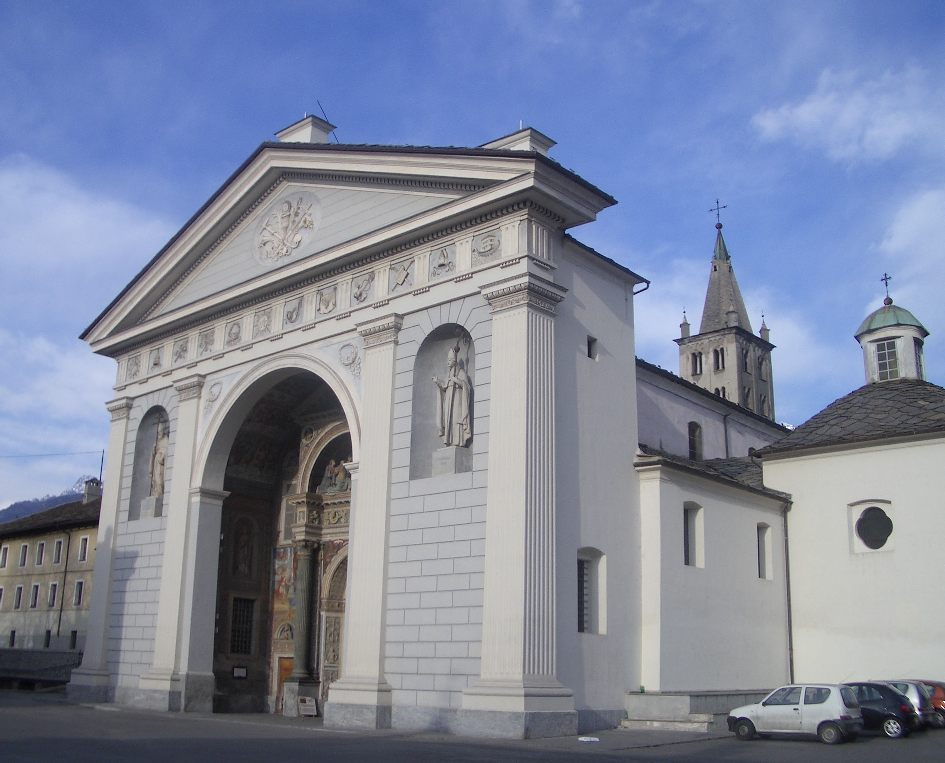
- Aosta Cathedral

Location
- Country: Italy
- Ecclesiastical province: Turin

Statistics
- Area: 3,262 km^{2} (1,259 sq mi)
- Population: Total; Catholics: (as of 2020); 127,271; 122,963 (96.6%)
- Parishes: 93

Information
- Denomination: Catholic Church
- Sui iuris church: Latin Church
- Rite: Roman Rite
- Established: 5th century
- Cathedral: Our Lady of Assumption and St. John the Baptist Cathedral, Aosta
- Secular priests: 74 (diocesan); 20 (Religious Orders); 15 Permanent Deacons

Current leadership
- Pope: Leo XIV
- Bishop: Franco Lovignana
- Bishops emeritus: Giuseppe Anfossi

Map

Website
- www.diocesiaosta.it

The Diocese of Aosta (Latin: Dioecesis Augustana, French: Diocèse d'Aoste, Italian: Diocesi di Aosta) is a Latin Church diocese of the Catholic Church. It has existed in its modern form since 1817. It is a suffragan of the Archdiocese of Turin in Italy.

== History ==
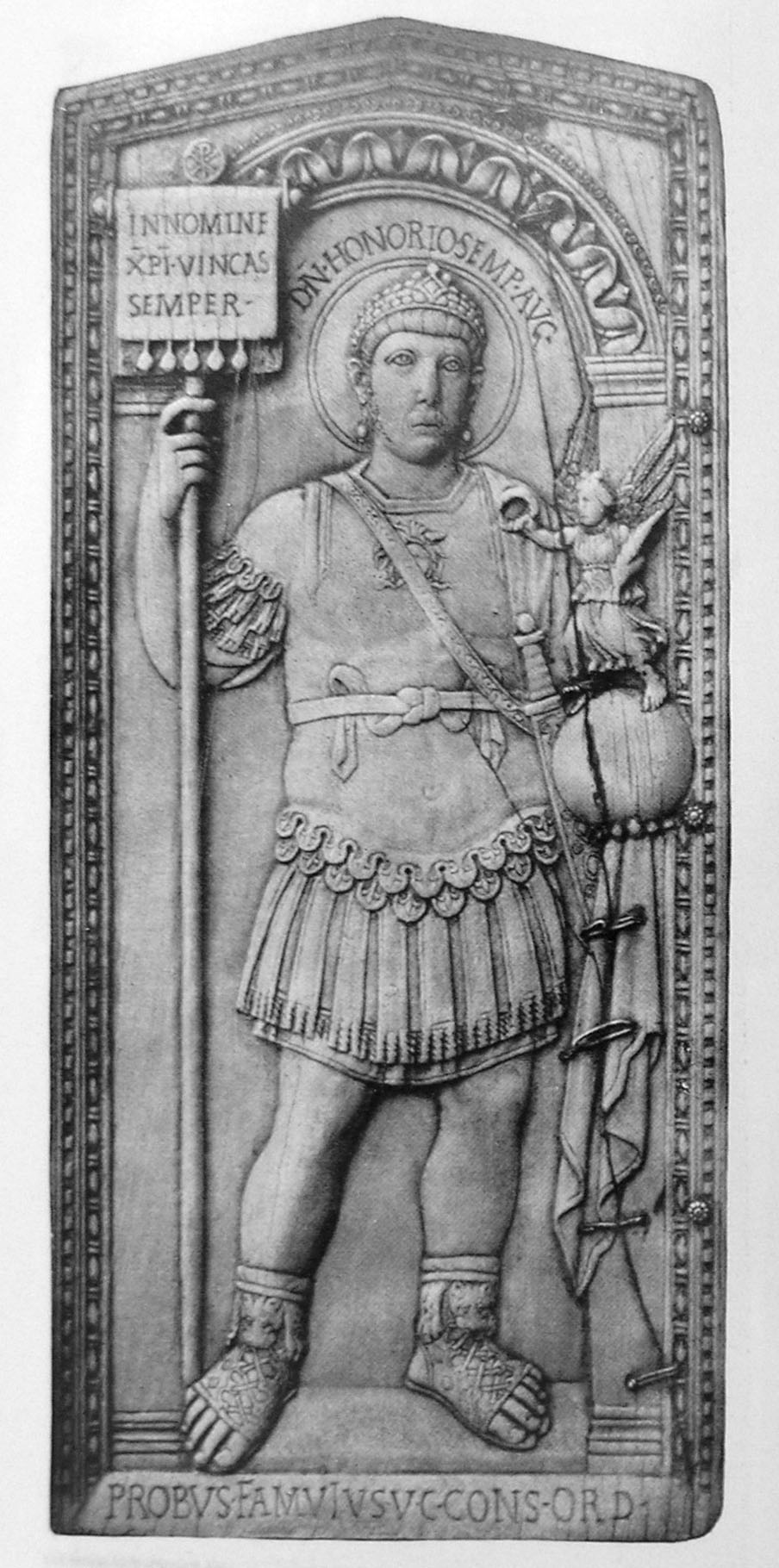
Western Roman Emperor Honorius, depicted on the consular diptych of Anicius Petronius Probus (406, Museo del tesoro della cattedrale di Aosta, CIL V, 6836)

The diocese of Aosta was founded no earlier than the 5th century. At that time it was a suffragan of the diocese of Milan. On 13 June 867, Pope Nicholas I made it was a suffragan of the Archbishop of Vienne, and it is known that in the 11th century it was a suffragan of the diocese of Tarentaise, a province created between 794 and 811. It then became subject to Milan again, but was restored to Tarentaise. The diocese of Aosta was suppressed by order of the Emperor Napoleon I, in 1802, an order which was given canonical effect by Pius VII in 1803.

Although Ursus is sometimes said to have been the first bishop, this is controverted. The first known bishop is St. Eustasius, whose name coupled with Aosta is signed to a letter sent to Pope Leo I by the second Synod of Milan in 451. In the cathedral treasury is a consular diptych of Anicius Petronius Probus, Roman consul in 406, which shows the Emperor Honorius. (It was discovered in 1833.) From the ninth century the list of bishops is fairly complete. Bernard of Menthon (1008), Archdeacon of Aosta, founded the hospice on the Alps named after him, as a relief to pilgrims.

In the 10th and early 11th centuries, the bishops of Aosta ruled the surrounding country as its secular counts. The two titles were separated at or following the death of Bishop Anselm of Aosta, in 1026, owing to Conrad II's desire to strengthen his position near the important Little St Bernard Pass and distrust of Burchard, Anselm's successor and a relative of various nobles opposed to Conrad's claims in Burgundy. (Burchard subsequently rose in a revolt, which failed; he was later translated to Lyons.)

His namesake, Anselm, Archbishop of Canterbury (1033–1109), was also a native of Aosta and probably related to its dynasty of bishops; however, rather than remain in local service, he travelled to Bec Abbey in Normandy and ultimately became primate over Norman England instead.

In 1133, Bishop Herbert, with the consent of the Provost and Canons of the Collegiate Church of S. Ursi (Ours), converted the Chapter of secular canons into an association of Canons Regular of S. Augustine. This change had the support and authority of Pope Innocent II behind it. The first Prior of the Canons of Saint-Ours was Arnulphus, who later became Bishop of Aosta. Two of his Canons, Aimon de Quart and Walbert, later became bishops of Aosta as well. In 1134 Bishop Herbert granted the Canons the free administration of their goods, releasing them from episcopal control. In 1135 Innocent II conceded the Canons of S. Ours the right of burial and the right to elect their own Prior. This was confirmed by Pope Lucius II in 1144, and Pope Eugene III in 1146.

In the 16th century, the honorific Duchy of Aosta was created by Savoy on the diocesan territory. In the Spring of 1536, John Calvin, the famous Protestant reformer, visited Aosta as he was returning to France from Ferrara. His preaching, however, brought him to the attention of Bishop Pierre Gazin, and he was forced to flee.

Following the Concordat of 1801 between Bonaparte and Pope Pius VII, the Pope issued a bull, Gravissimis causis (1 June 1803), in which the number of dioceses in Piedmont was reduced to eight: Turin, Vercelli, Ivrea, Acqui, Asti, Mondovi, Alessandria and Saluzzo. Ivrea was united with the former diocese of Aosta. Bishop Paolo Giuseppe Solaro di Villanova (French: Paul-Joseph Solar de Villeneuve) resigned, so as not to impede the operation of the Bull. The diocese of Aosta was re-established in 1817 by Pope Pius VII in his bull, Beati Petri (17 July 1817).

=== Synods ===
A diocesan synod was an irregularly held, but important, meeting of the bishop of a diocese and his clergy. Its purpose was (1) to proclaim generally the various decrees already issued by the bishop; (2) to discuss and ratify measures on which the bishop chose to consult with his clergy; (3) to publish statutes and decrees of the diocesan synod, of the provincial synod, and of the Holy See.

Bishop Simon de Duin issued a set of Statutes for the diocese in 1280. They are concerned mostly with the administration of the sacraments and the proper conduct of clerics.

A diocesan synod was held by Bishop Emeric in 1307; the Statutes issued at that time have survived. In the diocese the sacrament of Baptism was practiced by immersion rather than by sprinkling of water.

Bishop Oger Moriset (1411–1433) held a synod on 9 May 1424. Bishop François de Prez (1464–1511) held a synod on 15 April 1504.

Bishop André Jourdain (1832–1859) presided over a diocesan synod held on 27–29 August 1835. Bishop Joseph-Auguste Duc (1872–1907) held his first synod on 21 August 1874, his second in 1875, his third in 1876, and his sixth in September 1880.

=== Cathedral and Chapter ===
The cathedral of the Assumption in Aosta was served by a Chapter of regular clergy, presumably following the Rule of Saint Benedict until (perhaps) the second half of the 9th century, when the monastic discipline seems to have been relaxed; in 1133, under Bishop Humbertus, the rule of the Canons Regular was adopted. The Chapter consisted of two dignities, the Provost and the Archdeacon, and twenty Canons. One of the Canons served as Theologus. There were also fifty-two Perpetual Chaplains and six choir boys (called the Innocentes). A twenty-first Canon was added on 14 September 1721, through the generosity of Father Jean-Baptiste du Chatelard, Prior Commendatory of the cathedral. By 1743 there were twenty-three Canons.

In the filling of vacancies in the Chapter, an unusual system was followed. In the first month of each season of the year, the Pope had the right of appointment; in the second month of each season, the Bishop enjoyed the right; in the third month, the Chapter. This system lasted down until the administration of Bishop Filiberto Alberto Bailly (1659–1691), who traded his right to nominate in February, May, August, and November to the Pope, in exchange for the right to appoint to the cures in his diocese.

== Bishops of Aosta ==
=== to 1200 ===
- Eustasius (c. 451 ?)
- Gratus (c. 470)
- Jucundus (501, 502)
- Gallus (528–546)

[Ploceanus] (late sixth century?)

- Rathbornus (c. 876 – 877)
- Liutfred (c. 969)
- Anselmus (c. 990 – 14 January 1026)
- Burchard (before 10 March 1026 – after July 1033)
- Gizo (c. 1033–1039)
- Augustinus (c. 1040–1058)
- Anselm II (1075 or 1090)
- Boson I^{er} dit de la Porte Saint-Ours (before 1099 – after 1113 or 1114)
- Herbert (before November 1132 – after March 1139)
- Armannus (c. 1141)
- Boson II de la Porte Saint-Ours
- Hugues d'Avise
- Arnulphe d'Avise (before 1152 – after October 1158)
- Guillaume de la Palud de Gressan (before November 1161 – end 1170)
- Aymon de la Porte Saint-Ours (end 1170 or beginning 1071 – after April 1176)
- Guy (before June 1180 – after August 1185)
- Walbert (before May 1186 – 26 October 1212)

=== 1200 to 1500 ===
- Jacques I^{er} de Portia (before April 1213 – 1219)
- Boniface de Valperga (1219–1243)
- Rodolphe Grossi du Châtelard de La Salle (18 December 1243 – 2 March 1246)
- Pierre de Pra (before September 1246 – after April 1256)
- Pierre d'Étroubles (before December 1258 – 1 September 1259)
- Pierre (III) de Sarre or du Palais (before December 1260 – 5 February 1264)
- Humbert de Villette (before 22 September 1265 – 29 March 1272)
- Aymon de Challant (before 30 August 1272 – 21 December 1273)
- Simon de Duin (before 29 January 1275 – 1282)
- Nicolas I^{er} de Bersatoribus (1282 – 1301)
- Emerico di Quart (French: Émeric de Quart) (1302–1313)
- Arduce de Pont-Saint-Martin (before 1 April 1314 – between 7 and 10 March 1327)
- Nicolas (II) de Bersatoribus (5 October 1327 – 23 June 1361)
- Aimericus (22 October 1361 – 1375)
- Boniface de Challant (27 October 1375 – 27 August 1376)
- Ayméric (1376 – 1377) Bishop-elect
- Jacques II Ferrandin de Saint-Marcel (14 February 1377 – 4 July 1399)
- Pierre de Sonnaz (31 Oct 1399 – 1410 Died)
- Oger Moriset (12 Jan 1411 – 11 Feb 1433)
- Giorgio di Saluzzo (French: Georges de Saluce) (16 Feb 1433 – 1 Apr 1440)
- Jean de Prangins (1 Apr 1440 – 23 Oct 1444 Resigned)
- Antoine de Prez (23 Oct 1444 – 4 Apr 1464 Resigned)
- François de Prez (4 Apr 1464 – 22 May 1511)

=== 1500 to 1803 ===
- Ercole d'Azeglio (22 Aug 1511 – 6 Jun 1515)
- Amedeo Berruti (13 Jun 1515 – Feb 1525)
- François de Chevron (1525) Bishop-elect
- Pierre IV Gazin, O.S.A. Lateran. (1528 – May 1557)
- Marcantonio Bobba (14 Jun 1557 – 1568 Resigned)
- Girolamo Ferragatta, O.S.A. (30 Apr 1568 – 1572)
- Cesare Gromis (19 Nov 1572 – 25 June 1585)
- Jean II Geoffroi Ginod (16 July 1586 – 27 Feb 1592)
- Onorato Lascaris, O.C.S.Aug. (23 March 1594 – 11 July 1594)
- Bartolomeo Ferreri (or Ferrero) (5 May 1595 – 4 Aug 1607)
- Ludovic Martini (31 Jan 1611 – 10 Dec 1621)
- Giovanni Battista Vercellino (French: Jean-Baptiste Vercellin) (13 Feb 1623 – 17 Mar 1651)
- Philibert Milliet de Faverges, C.R.L. (16 Oct 1656 – 29 Jul 1658)
- Antoine Philibert Albert Bailly, B. (13 Jan 1659 – 3 Apr 1691)
- Alexandre Lambert de Soyrier (25 Jun 1692 – 24 Nov 1698)
- François Milliet d'Arvillars (5 Jan 1699 – 25 Jun 1727)
- Jacques III Rambert (26 Nov 1727 – 16 Sep 1728)
- Jean III Grillet, O.P. (3 Oct 1729 – 14 Sep 1730 Died)

Sede vacante (1730 – 1741)

- Pierre-François de Sales de Thorens (17 Apr 1741 – 5 Dec 1783)
- Paolo Giuseppe Solaro di Villanova (French: Paul-Joseph Solar de Villeneuve) (20 Sep 1784 – 15 May 1803 Resigned)

1803: Suppressed

- Giuseppe Maria Grimaldi (1805 – 1817) Bishop of Ivrea and Aosta

=== since 1817 ===
1817: Reestablished

- André-Marie de Maistre (16 Mar 1818 Confirmed – 18 Jul 1818 Died)
- Jean-Baptiste-Marie Aubriot de la Palme (29 Mar 1819 Confirmed – 30 Jul 1823 Resigned)
- Evasio Secondo Agodino (French: Evase-Second-Victor Agodino) (12 Jul 1824 – 24 Apr 1831 Died)
- André Jourdain (2 Jul 1832 – 29 May 1859)

Sede vacante (1859 – 1867)

- Jacques-Joseph Jans (22 Feb 1867 – 21 Mar 1872 Died)
- Joseph-Auguste Duc (29 Jul 1872 – 16 Dec 1907 Resigned)
- Giovanni Vincenzo Tasso, C.M. (30 Mar 1908 – 24 Aug 1919 Died)
- Claude-Ange-Joseph Calabrese (7 May 1920 – 7 May 1932 Died)
- Francesco Imberti (23 Jul 1932 – 10 Oct 1945)
- Maturino Blanchet (Mathurin Blanchet), O.M.I. (18 Feb 1946 – 15 Oct 1968 Retired)
- Ovidio Lari (15 Oct 1968 – 30 Dec 1994 Retired)
- Giuseppe Anfossi (30 Dec 1994 – 9 Nov 2011 Retired)
- Franco Lovignana (9 Nov 2011 – )

== Territory and parishes ==
The diocese, which covers an area of 3,262 km^{2} and has a population of 129,288, is divided into 93 parishes. All are in the (civil) region of Aosta Valley. There is a list of parishes by commune; locations (villages or neighbourhoods) within a commune are shown in brackets. Many of the ancient parishes appear in the documents of the Cartulary of the Bishops of Aosta.

== Bibliography ==
=== Reference works ===
- A'Becket, John Joseph (1907). "Diocese of Aosta" . In Herbermann, Charles (ed.). Catholic Encyclopedia. Vol. 1. New York: Robert Appleton Company.
  - Battandier, Albert (1906), Annuaire pontifical catholique, Paris: Maison de la Bonne Presse. (Cited by A'Becket 1907 as 'BATTANDIER, Ann. Cath. Pont., 1906'.)
- Gams, Pius Bonifatius (1873). Series episcoporum Ecclesiae catholicae: quotquot innotuerunt a beato Petro apostolo. Ratisbon: Typis et Sumptibus Georgii Josephi Manz. pp. 828–829. (in Latin)
- Eubel, Conradus, ed. (1913). Hierarchia catholica. Vol. Tomus 1 (second ed.). Münster: Libreria Regensbergiana. (in Latin) [Eubel was unacquainted with local Piedmontese documents, and is frequently unreliable]
- Eubel, Conradus, ed. (1914). Hierarchia catholica. Vol. Tomus 2 (second ed.). Münster: Libreria Regensbergiana. (in Latin)
- Gulik, Guilelmus (1923). Eubel, Conradus (ed.). Hierarchia catholica. Vol. Tomus 3 (second ed.). Münster: Libreria Regensbergiana. (in Latin)
- Gauchat, Patritius (Patrice) (1935). Hierarchia catholica. Vol. Tomus IV (1592–1667). Münster: Libraria Regensbergiana. (in Latin)
- Ritzler, Remigius; Sefrin, Pirminus (1952). Hierarchia catholica medii et recentis aevi V (1667–1730). Patavii: Messagero di S. Antonio.
- Ritzler, Remigius; Sefrin, Pirminus (1958). Hierarchia catholica medii et recentis aevi. Vol. Tomus VI (1730–1799). Patavii: Messagero di S. Antonio. (in Latin)
- Ritzler, Remigius; Sefrin, Pirminus (1968). Hierarchia Catholica medii et recentioris aevi sive summorum pontificum, S. R. E. cardinalium, ecclesiarum antistitum series... A pontificatu Pii PP. VII (1800) usque ad pontificatum Gregorii PP. XVI (1846) (in Latin). Vol. VII. Monasterii: Libr. Regensburgiana.
- Remigius Ritzler; Pirminus Sefrin (1978). Hierarchia catholica Medii et recentioris aevi... A Pontificatu PII PP. IX (1846) usque ad Pontificatum Leonis PP. XIII (1903) (in Latin). Vol. VIII. Il Messaggero di S. Antonio.
- Pięta, Zenon (2002). Hierarchia catholica medii et recentioris aevi... A pontificatu Pii PP. X (1903) usque ad pontificatum Benedictii PP. XV (1922) (in Latin). Vol. IX. Padua: Messagero di San Antonio. ISBN 978-88-250-1000-8.

=== Studies ===
- Bima, Palemone Luigi (1842). Serie cronologica dei romani pontefici e degli arcivescovi e vescovi di tutti gli stati di Terraferma & S. S. B. M. e di alcune del regno di Sardegna (in Italian) (seconda ed.). Torino: Favale.
- Duc, Joseph Auguste (1884). "Cartulaire de l'Évêché d'Aoste (XIIIe siècle)". In: Miscellanea di storia italiana 23 (Torino: Fratelli Bocca. 1884), pp. 183–339.
- Duc, Joseph Auguste (1885). Esquisses historiques des évêques d'Aoste appartenant au XII ̊et au XIII ̊siécles (in French). Aosta: Édouard Duc.
- Duc, Pierre-Etienne (1870). Le clergé d'Aoste de 1800 a 1870 (in French). Aosta: Imprimerie J. B. Mensio.
- Duc, Pierre-Étienne (1872). Catalogue chronologique des évêques d'Aoste de 360 à 1872. Aoste 1872. (in French)
- Duchesne, Louis (1907). Fastes épiscopaux de l'ancienne Gaule: I. Provinces du Sud-Est. Paris: Fontemoing. pp. 247–248. second edition (in French)
- Frutaz, Amato Pietro (1966). Le fonti per la storia della Valle d'Aosta. Thesaurus Ecclesiarum Italiae I, 1. (in Italian). Roma: Ed. di Storia e Letteratura. GGKEY:G2G579NHXT9.
- Kehr, Paul Fridolin (1914). Italia pontificia : sive, Repertorium privilegiorum et litterarum a romanis pontificibus ante annum 1598 Italiae ecclesiis, monasteriis, civitatibus singulisque personis concessorum. Vol. VI. pars ii. Berolini: Weidmann. pp. 157–167.
- Lanzoni, Francesco (1927). Le diocesi d'Italia dalle origini al principio del secolo VII (an. 604). Faenza: F. Lega, pp. 1052–1056. (in Italian)
- Lasteyrie, Ferdinand de (1854). La cathédrale d'Aoste: étude archéologique (in French). Paris: V. Didron.
- Manno, Antonio (1891). Bibliografia storica degli stati della monarchia di Savoia (in Italian). Vol. Tomo II. Torino: Fratelli Bocca. pp. 276–315.
- Sainte-Marthe, Denis de (1770). Benedictine Congregation of S. Maur (ed.). Gallia christiana, in provincias ecclesiasticas distributa (in Latin). Paris: Typographia Regia. pp. 806–825.
- Savio, Fedele (1898). Gli antichi vescovi d'Italia dalle origini al 1300 descritti per regioni: Il Piemonte (in Italian). Torino: Fratelli Bocca. pp. 69–108.
- Tillier, Jean-Baptiste de (1887). Historique de la vallée d'Aoste. Aoste: Louis Mensio. [ms. of 1742, ed. by Sylvain Lucat] (in French)
- Ughelli, Ferdinando; Coleti, Niccolo (1719). Italia sacra, sive de episcopis Italiae et insularum adjacentium (in Latin). Vol. Tomus quartus (4) (2nd ed.). Venice: Apud Sebastianum Coleti. pp. 1096–1102.
