= Boniface of Valperga =

Boniface of Valperga (French: Boniface I^{er} de Valperga, Italian: Bonifacio di Valperga) (died 25 April 1243), venerated as a blessed in the Catholic Church, was a thirteenth-century Bishop of Aosta.

Boniface was born in the second half of the twelfth century into a noble family of the Canavese, which claimed descent from Arduino d’Ivrea. He was educated at home and subsequently by his uncle Arduino, Bishop of Turin. He entered the religious life as a monk at the Benedictine abbey of Fruttuaria, about twenty kilometres north of Turin. Subsequently, he entered the Augustinian Collegiate church of Saint Ursus in Aosta where, having been made Prior in 1210, he exerted a vigorous leadership in both the spiritual and temporal realms. On 17 July 1219, Boniface was made Bishop of Aosta, an office he held until his death nearly 24 years later, on 25 April 1243.

He was entombed first in the Collegiate church of Saint Ursus; then his remains were translated to the cathedral of Aosta. His cultus developed rapidly, and his veneration as a “blessed” remained steady over the centuries, with various monuments being dedicated to him in the cathedral. It was ratified as ab immemorabili by Pope Leo XIII on 28 April 1890.
