= Canons Regular of the Immaculate Conception =

Catholic religious order for men

- Congregatio Canonicorum Regularium Immaculatæ Conceptionis (Latin)
- Abbreviation: Post-nominal letters: C.R.I.C.
- Formation: 21 November 1866; 159 years ago
- Founder: Adrien Gréa
- Founded at: Saint-Claude France
- Type: Order of Canons Regular of Pontifical Right (for Men)
- Headquarters: Via Federico Torre 21, 00152 Rome, Italy
- Members: 48 members (42 priests) as of 2018
- Motto: Latin: English:
- Superior General: Rinaldo Guarisco
- Parent organization: Roman Catholic Church

The Canons Regular of the Immaculate Conception (Latin: Congregatio Canonicorum Regularium Immaculatæ Conceptionis) are a Catholic religious order for men founded in France in 1871. They follow the Augustinian Rule and are part of the Order of Canons Regular of St. Augustine. They add the nominal initials of C.R.I.C. after their names to indicate their membership in the congregation.

== History ==
Adrien Gréa was born on February 18, 1828, and studied law at L’École des Chartes in Paris, where he became friends with Frederic Ozanam, the founder of the Society of St. Vincent de Paul. He later took a doctorate in theology at the Sapientia University, and was ordained to the sacred priesthood on September 20, 1856.

The congregation was founded at Saint-Claude, in the Department of Jura, by Adrien Gréa, then a secular priest and Vicar General of the Diocese of St.-Claude, a position he had accepted in 1863 at the bishop's urging, despite his feeling of being called to life in a religious community.

Through his position of authority in the diocese, Gréa came to see many of the troubles experienced in the lives of its clergy. He came to attribute much of the problem to the isolation of their lives, even when sharing a rectory. Having studied Church history while preparing for his ordination as a priest, he felt that a solution could be found in the communal lives of the canons regular, who combine a monastic way of life with the pastoral care of the secular clergy. He then determined to commit himself to that way of life.

Together with two companions who wished to join him in this form of life, Gréa settled in a small house where they began to follow the traditional monastic practices of the canonical life, rising at midnight to start the day's cycle of the Liturgy of the Hours on 21 November 1865 as well as the traditional fastings and abstinence. They took their first religious vows on the first anniversary of the inauguration, and together with two other canons, perpetual vows on 8 September 1871, made to the Bishop of Saint-Claude, who simultaneously gave them official approval as a religious community. The new congregation received the papal Decretum laudis only five years later from Pope Pius IX, who also gave the congregation its name. He and his successor, Pope Leo XIII, were to give their formal approval of the congregation in three different rescripts (1870, 1876 and 1887).

The Canons took their first step toward the life they had envisioned in December 1880, when the bishop gave them the charge of a parish in the small town of Lescheres. They quickly organized the life of the parish, educating the children and starting a choir which would provide music for the daily Vespers services of the canonical community. This situation did not last long, for they were expelled from the town when the authorities of the anti-clerical national government learned of their presence there.

In 1890 the Canons were given the ancient Abbey of St. Antony, Saint-Antoine-l'Abbaye, in the Department of Isère, leaving their original home. In 1896, Pope Leo, recognizing the growth of the congregation, raised Gréa from the rank of prior to that of abbot. He received the formal abbatial blessing on the Feast of the Immaculate Conception (8 December) of that same year.

The motherhouse of the congregation was maintained at Saint-Antoine from 1890 until 1903, when, following the anti-clerical laws passed by the French government in 1901 and the persecution of the Church which resulted from them, the community was transferred to Andora, in the Italian region of Liguria, and then near the Gianicolo in Rome in 1922, where it remains today, and where the Superior General resides.

The congregation is international, having houses in France, Italy, Peru (where a mission was established in 1905), England (where the community has been present since 1932), Brazil, the United States, and Canada, the first mission of the congregation, established in 1891 at Nomingue in Ottawa and at St. Boniface, Manitoba. There were four establishments in the Diocese of Ottawa, six in that of St. Boniface, two in Saskatchewan and one in Prince Albert, a community was composed of eight priests and major clerics, and of about as many scholastics, postulants and lay brothers. The priests have been successfully employed in colonization and the education of youth.

The Congregation of the Immaculate Conception, together with eight other congregations of Canons Regular make up the Confederation of Canons Regular of St. Augustine.

The current Superior General, Rinaldo Guarisco, was elected at the 2018 General Chapter.

In England, the Congregation has charge of the parish of the Most Sacred Heart of Jesus Luton in Northampton Diocese. In the United States the community has charge of St Sebastian's and Our Lady of Guadalupe parishes and a house of formation in Santa Paula, California, in the Archdiocese of Los Angeles. The house in California faced allegations of intimidation and abuse in June 2022.
