= Aosta Cathedral =

Roman Catholic cathedral in Aosta, Italy

Cathedral of the Assumption of Mary and Saint John the Baptist Cattedrale di Santa Maria Assunta e San Giovanni Battista Cathédrale Notre-Dame-de-l'Assomption et Saint-Jean-le-Baptiste
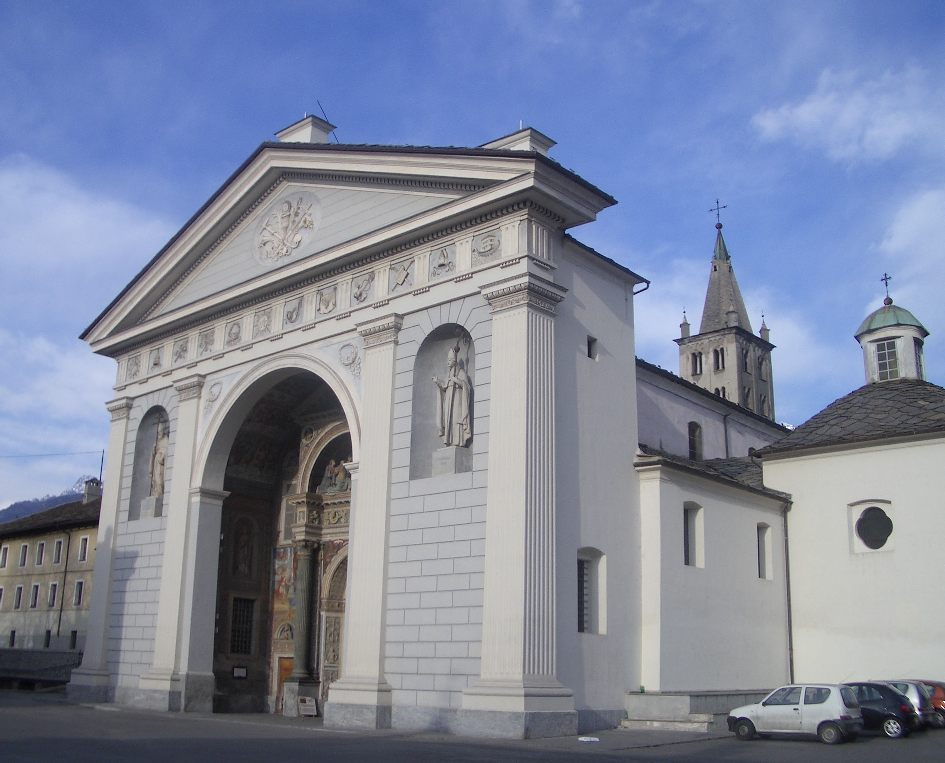
- Aosta Cathedral

Religion
- Affiliation: Roman Catholic Church
- Province: Diocese of Aosta
- Region: Aosta Valley
- Ecclesiastical or organisational status: Cathedral
- Year consecrated: 1025
- Status: Active

Location
- Location: Aosta, Italy
- Interactive map of Cathedral of the Assumption of Mary and Saint John the Baptist; Cattedrale di Santa Maria Assunta e San Giovanni Battista; Cathédrale Notre-Dame-de-l'Assomption et Saint-Jean-le-Baptiste
- Coordinates: 45.738305°N 7.317737°E

Architecture
- Type: Church
- Style: Romanesque, Renaissance, Neoclassical
- Groundbreaking: 11th century
- Completed: 1848

Aosta Cathedral (Italian: Cattedrale di Aosta; Cattedrale di Santa Maria Assunta e San Giovanni Battista; French: Cathédrale d'Aoste; Cathédrale Notre-Dame-de-l'Assomption et Saint-Jean-le-Baptiste) is a Roman Catholic cathedral in Aosta, in north-west Italy, built in the 4th century. It is the episcopal seat of the Diocese of Aosta.

In the 11th century the Palaeo-Christian structure was replaced by a new one, dedicated to the Assumption of the Virgin Mary and Saint John the Baptist. The architecture of the cathedral was modified during the 15th and 16th century.

The present façade, in Neoclassical style, was built between 1846 and 1848. It surrounds the 16th century portal in Renaissance style, decorated with statues and frescoes showing scenes of the life of the Virgin Mary. The structures remaining from the Romanesque period are two clock-towers and the crypt, and also the remaining part of an Ottonian fresco cycle on the church ceiling.

== Gallery ==
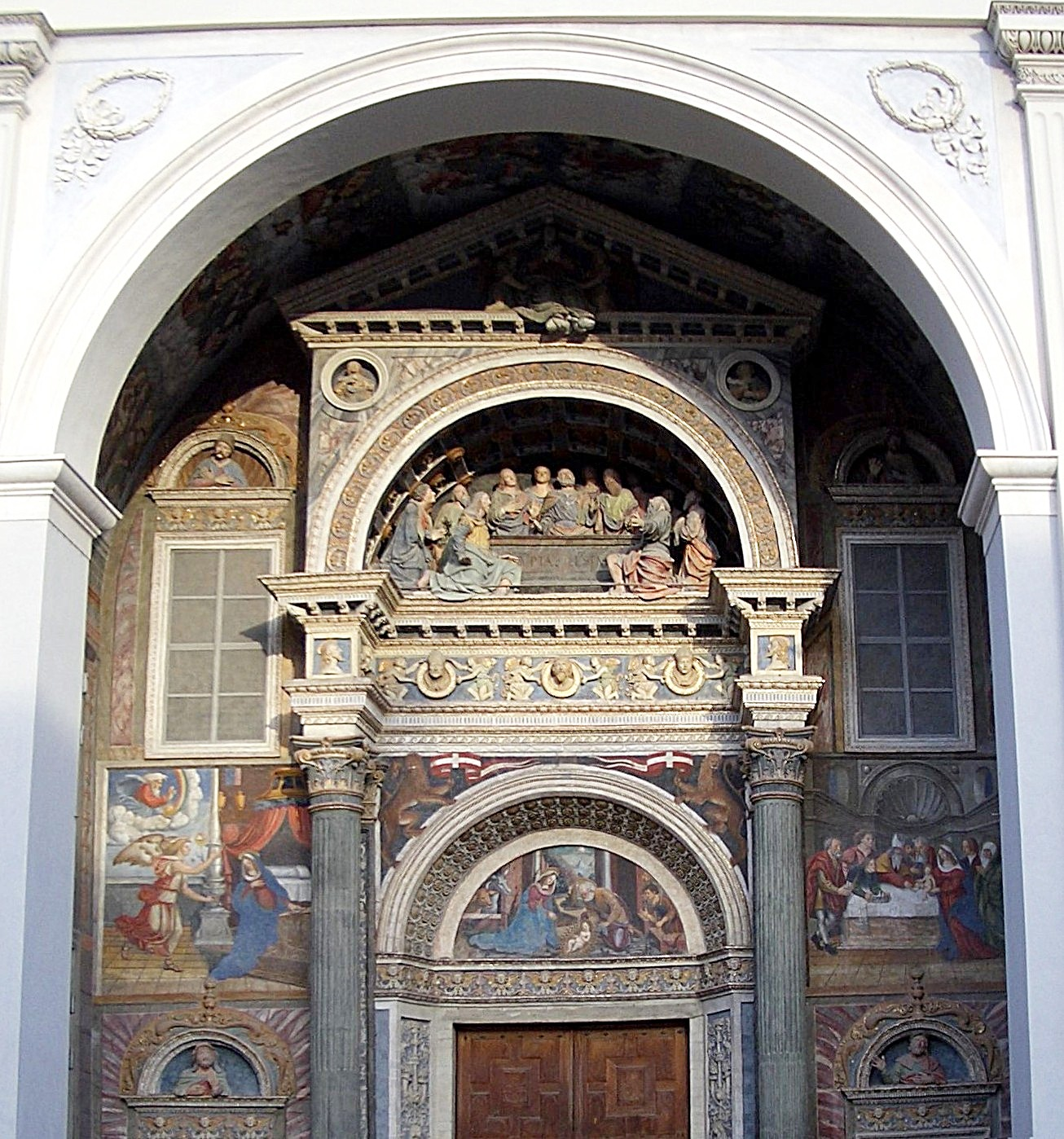
The door

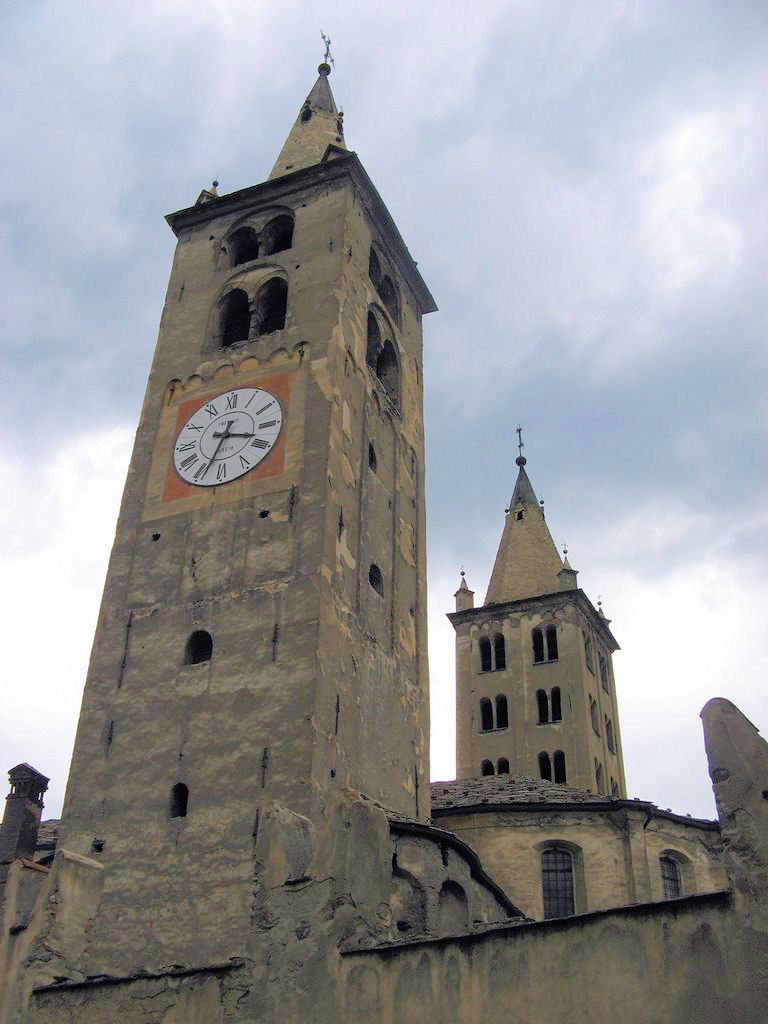
The Romanesque clock-towers

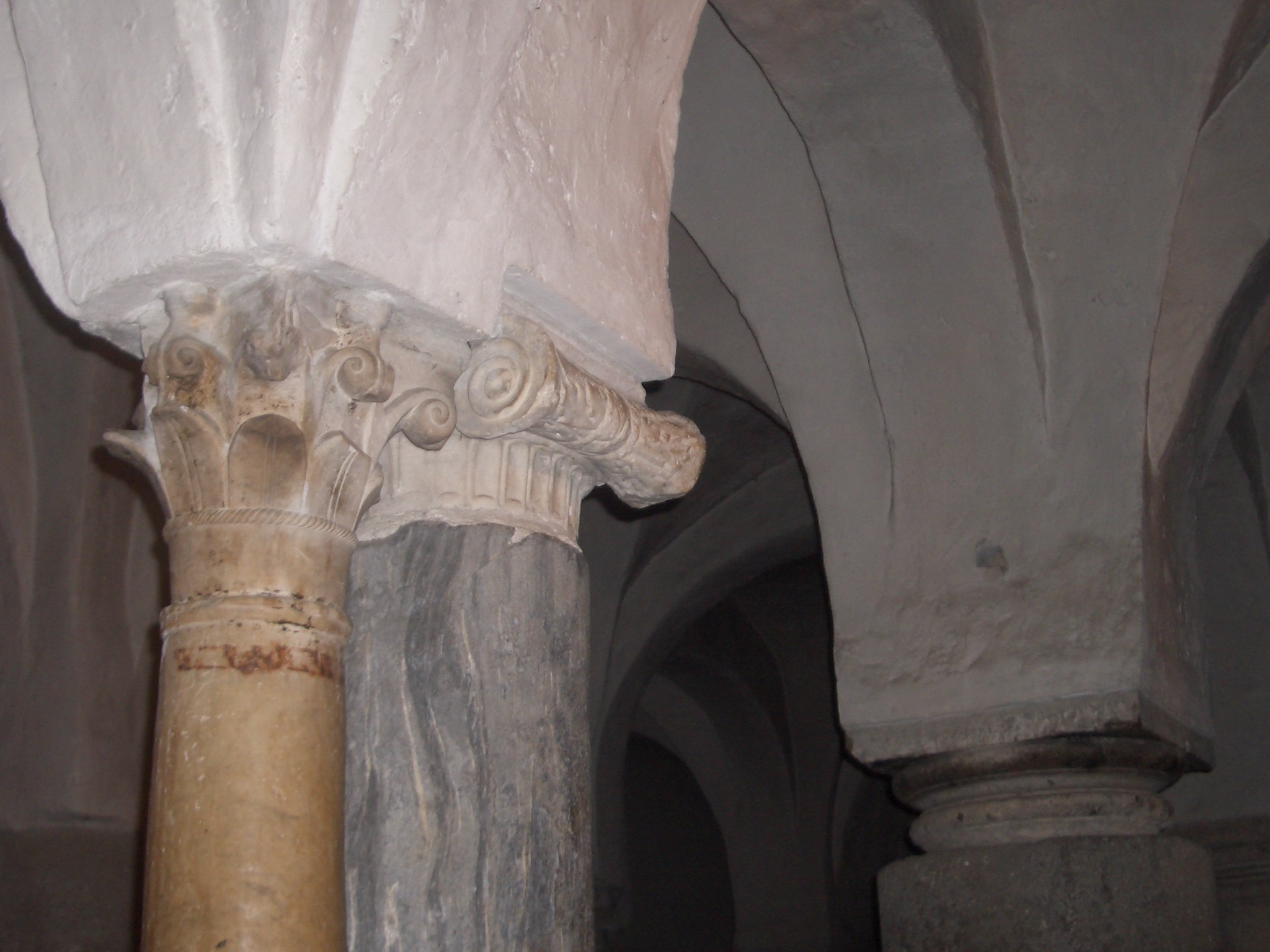
The crypt

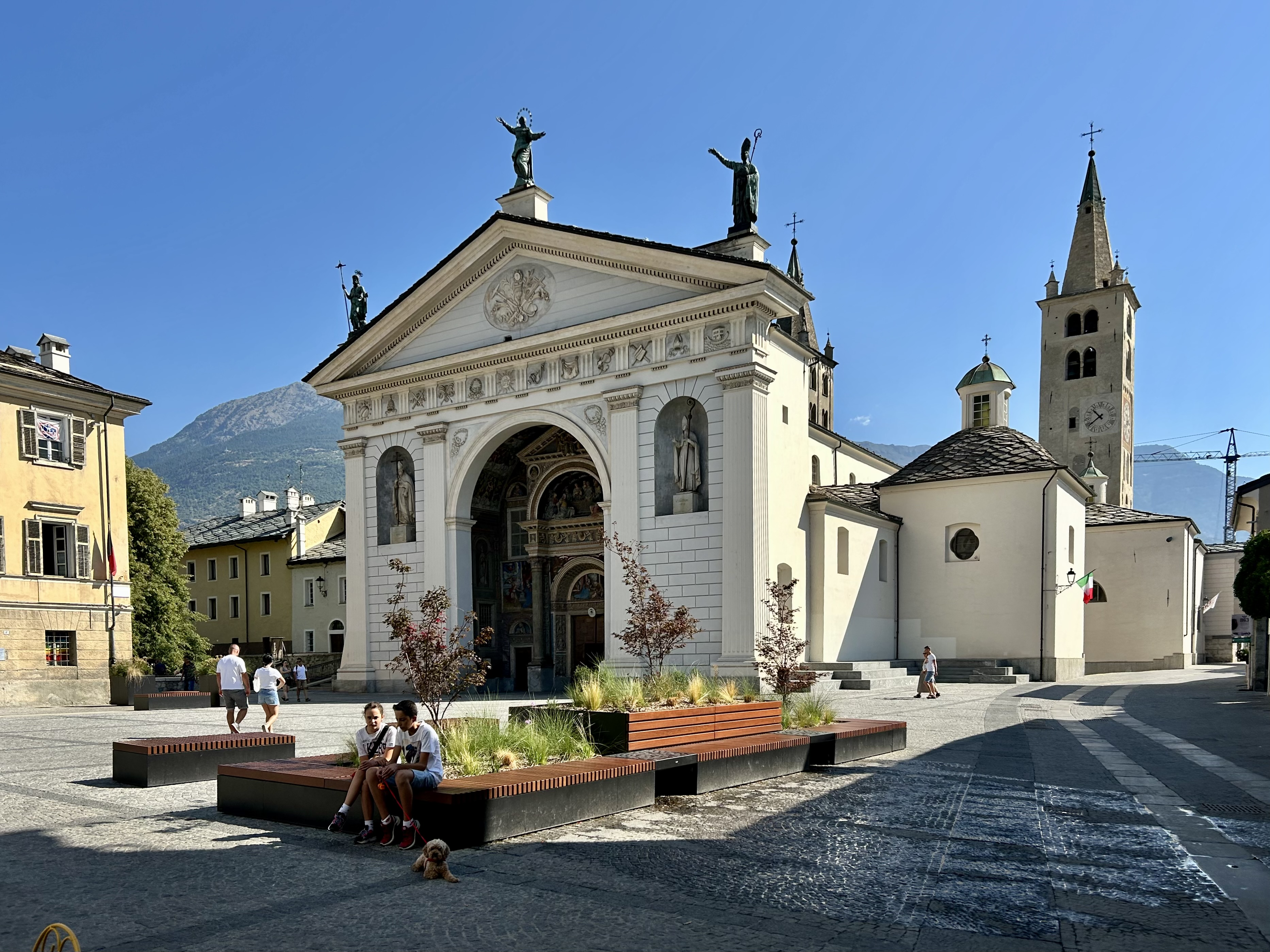

== Bibliography ==
- Lasteyrie, Ferdinand de (1854). La cathédrale d'Aoste: étude archéologique (in French). Paris: V. Didron.
- Robert Berton, La cathédrale d'Aoste, Aoste : Imprimerie Marguerettaz (in French)
- Sandra Barberi, Cathédrale d'Aoste : les fresques du XI^{e} siècle, Aoste : Imprimerie valdôtaine, 2006
- Cortelazzo, Mauro – Perinetti, Renato – Papone, Paolo – Vallet, Viviana, La cathédrale d'Aoste : du chantier roman à nos jours, études archéologiques et textes: Mauro Cortelazzo, Paolo Papone, Renato Perinetti, Viviana Vallet, Aoste: Région autonome Vallée d'Aoste. Assessorat de l'éducation et de la culture. Département de la surintendance des activités et des biens culturels, 2008 Cadran solaire
- Paolo Curtaz, Omar Borettaz, Ronnie Borbey, L'église cathédrale d'Aoste : un lieu, une histoire, la foi d'un peuple, Aosta
- Lin Colliard, La Cathédrale d'Aoste au XV^{e} siècle : extrait de l'ordinaire d'Aoste, Aoste : Imprimerie valdôtaine, 1978
- Édouard Aubert, Les mosaïques de la Cathédrale d'Aoste, Paris : Librairie archéologique de Victor Didron, 1857
- Joseph-Auguste Duc, Symbolisme architectural de la Cathédrale d'Aoste, Aoste : Imprimerie catholique, 1901
- Joseph-Auguste Duc, Mosaïque du chœur de la Cathédrale d'Aoste : son âge, in Société académique, religieuse et scientifique du Duché d'Aoste
- La restauration de la façade de la cathédrale d'Aoste, Aoste : Région autonome Vallée d'Aoste. Assessorat de l'éducation et de la culture. Surintendance aux biens culturels, 1997
- Abbé Joseph-Marie Henry, Maîtrise de la Cathédrale d'Aoste, Aoste : Imprimerie catholique, 1919
- Orphée Zanolli, Mélodies inédites à l'usage de la Cathédrale d'Aoste : les Noëls en vieux français, Aoste : éd. Musumeci, 1977
- Charles Bonnet, Renato Perinetti, Remarques sur la crypte de la cathédrale d'Aoste, Aoste : éd. Musumeci, 1977
- Robert Berton, Les stalles de la cathédrale d'Aoste avec leurs miséricordes : un joyau d'art gothique du XVe siècle, préface d'Adrien Bruhl, Novara : De Agostini, copyr. 1961
- Duc, Joseph-Auguste, Le Chapitre de la cathédrale d'Aoste a-t-il été autrefois régulier?, in Société académique, religieuse et scientifique du Duché d'Aoste
- Zanolli, Orphée Les "obitus" et les notes marginales du martyrologe de la Cathédrale d'Aoste (XIIIe siècle)
- Barberi, S., 2002: Cattedrale di Aosta. Gli affreschi dell'XI secolo. Published on behalf of the Autonomous Region Aosta Valley, printed by Umberto Allemandi Editore, Turin.
- Brezzi, E. Rossetti, 1989: La pittura in Valle d'Aosta tra la fine del 1300 e il primo quarto del 1500. Firenze: Casa Editrice Le Lettere
- Garino, Luigi (ed.), n.d.: Museo del Tesoro, Cattedrale di Aosta, catalogue edited by the Aosta Cathedral chapter
- Orlandoni, B., 1995: Architettura in Valle d'Aosta – Il romanico e il gotico. Ivrea: Priuli & Verlucca
- Orlandoni, B., 1995: Architettura in Valle d'Aosta – Il Quattrocento. Ivrea: Priuli & Verlucca
- Aosta Valley autonomous region, 2007: La Cattedrale di Aosta; dalla domus ecclesiae al cantiere romanico or La cathédrale d'Aoste : de la domus ecclesiae au chantier roman (text and DVD). Aosta: Cadran Solaire (in Italian and French)
- ditto, 2008
