= Becca di Nona =

Mountain in Italy

Becca di Nona Pic de Nona
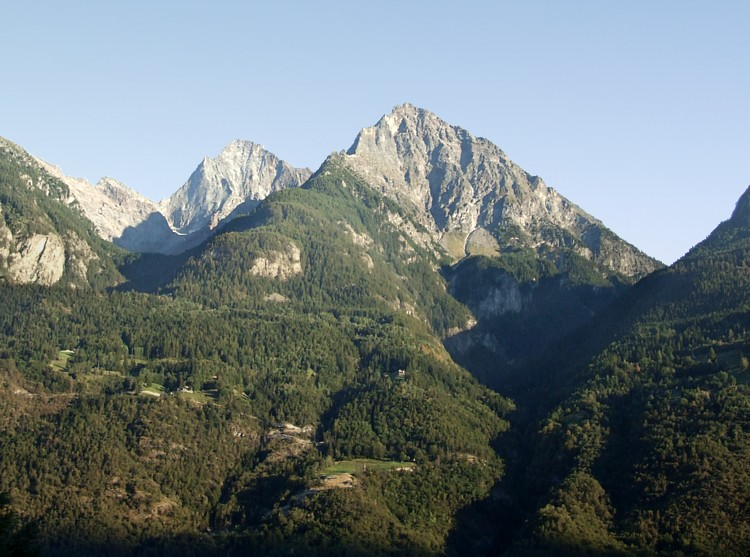
- Becca di Nona in the foreground, with the higher Monte Emilius in the background (left).

Highest point
- Elevation: 3,142 m (10,308 ft)
- Prominence: 242 m (794 ft)
- Coordinates: 45°41′17.19″N 7°21′54.09″E

Geography
- Location within Italy
- Location: Aosta Valley, Italy
- Parent range: Graian Alps

Becca di Nona (French: Pic de Nona) is a peak in the Graian Alps of the Aosta Valley in north-western Italy. Together with Monte Emilius, it is one of the main mountains visible from Aosta looking southwards.

== History ==
This mountain was known in the past as Pic de onze heures, that is to say "11 a.m. peak" in French, as the sun stands right on top of it at 11 am.

In 1857, the Aostan doctor Laurent Cerise suggested to nominate it Pic Carrel, after the Valdotainian prior Georges Carrel, but his proposal was not accepted.

The hagiography of St Anselm written by his chaplain Eadmer records that, when he was a child, he had a mystical vision of God and his court on the mountain.

== Sports ==
At the top is a cast iron statue of St. Mary. Every year a running race, the Becca di Nona Skyrace or Skyrace Ville d'Aoste, is organized starting from Émile Chanoux square in Aosta, arriving to the peak and returning to the city.
