= Perron =

Perron may refer to:

== People ==
- Count Perron (Italian: Conte de Perron; fl. 1780s), Sardinian ambassador and secretary of state
- Ernest Perron (1908–1961), a Swiss man who became politically powerful in Iran
- Pierre Cuillier-Perron (1753–1834), a French military adventurer in India
- Fleuri Perron (1866–1931), an Alberta politician and businessman
- Oskar Perron (1880–1975), a German mathematician
- Jayden Perron (born 2005), a Canadian ice hockey player
- Jean Perron (born 1946), a head coach in the National Hockey League
- Gilles Perron (1940-2024), a Canadian politician
- Marshall Perron (born 1942), a former Chief Minister of the Northern Territory of Australia
- David Perron (born 1988), a Canadian ice hockey player
- François Perron, a French born ballet dancer who now works and resides in the United States

== Other ==
- Perron (columnar monument), a column built in cities belonging to the Prince-Bishopric of Liège (980–1795)
- Perron of Liège, such a column in the city of Liège
- Perron (staircase), an external staircase usually leading to the main entrance of a building

== See also ==
- Duperron, a French surname
- Peron (disambiguation)
