= Council of Bari =

Synod during the First Crusade

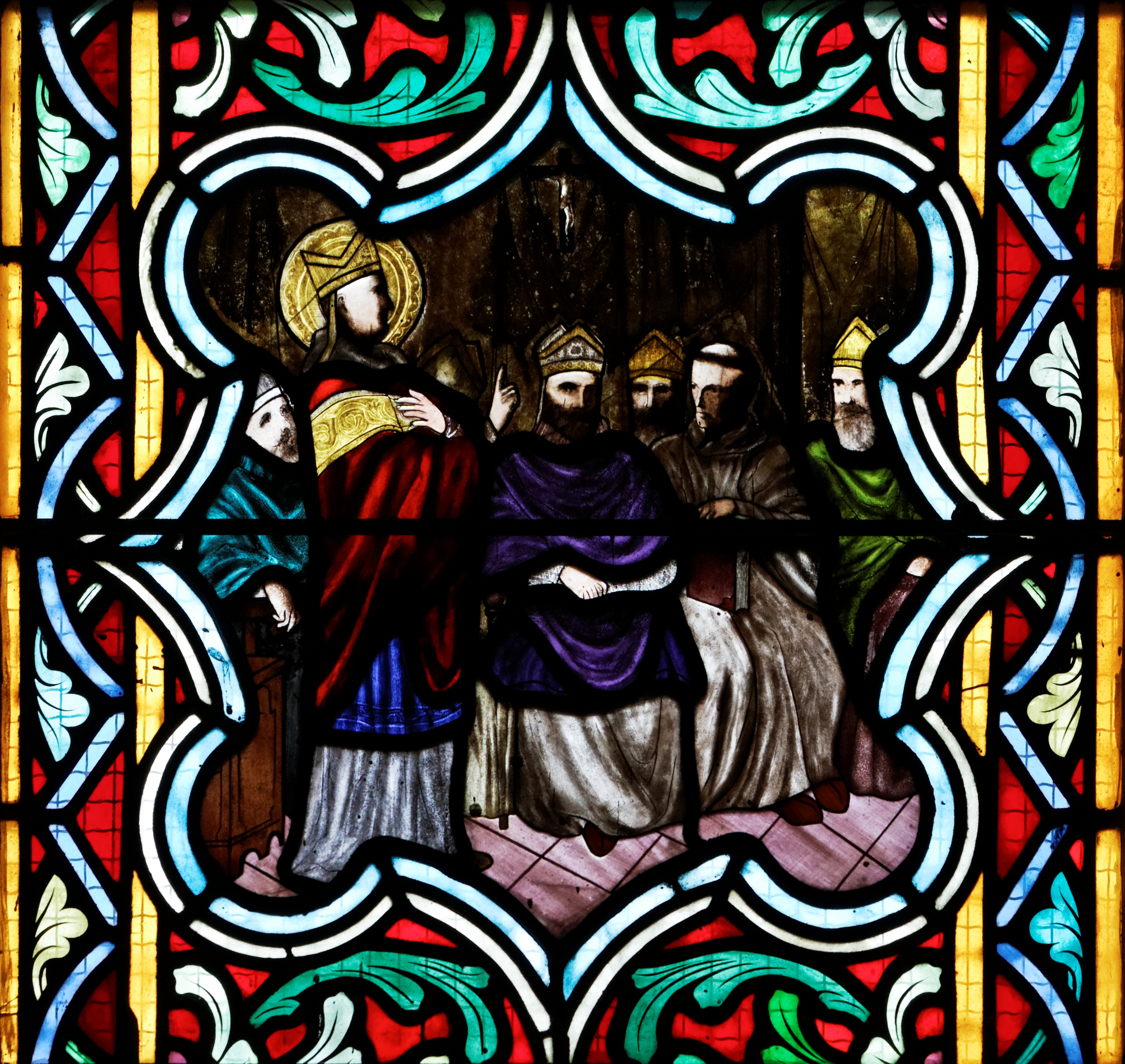
St Anselm speaking before the council, from a 19th-century stained-glass window in Quimper Cathedral in Brittany.

The Council of Bari was convened and presided over by Pope Urban II in Bari, Italy, in October 1098 during the First Crusade. It was attended by 185 bishops, both Catholic and Orthodox.

== Council ==
The official record of its acts has been lost, but has been partially reconstructed from other records. (Note: Although the account of the council by Anselm's biographer Eadmer principally consists of descriptions of the other bishops' clothes, Anselm later published a version of his remarks as his De Processione Spiritus Sancti.) It is sometimes presented as a failed attempt to deal with the Great Schism which had begun to emerge between the Western and Eastern Church, but it is much more likely that the "Greek bishops" who were present were the local bishops of southern Italy, some of whom had been ruled by Constantinople as recently as 1071. Under pressure from their Norman lords, these Italian Greeks seem to have accepted papal supremacy and Anselm's theology regarding the correctness of the Western church's use of unleavened bread in the Eucharist and its inclusion of the filioque clause to the Nicene Creed's account of the procession of the Holy Spirit. The council also condemned William II of England, who had forced Anselm, the reforming archbishop of Canterbury, into exile. Eadmer credited Anselm with restraining the pope from excommunicating him, although others attribute Urban's politic nature.

No high-profile Orthodox theologians of the time, such as Theophylact of Ohrid, seem to have been present.

== Results ==
The council was dominated by its Catholic members and anathematized those who disagreed with Anselm's positions on the filioque and the use of unleavened bread in the Eucharist. It had no effect on the reuniting of the Greek and Roman churches, but appears to have successfully standardized church practice in the Norman lands of southern Italy.

== See also ==
- Councils of Lyon & Florence, both aimed at reuniting the Western and Eastern Church
