= Carlo Baldassare Perrone di San Martino =

Conte Carlo Baldassare Perrone di San Martino, known in some English sources as Count Perron, was the Sardinian resident minister in Great Britain between 1749 and 1755. In 1777 he was appointed Regent of the Secretariat for Foreign Affairs and in 1779 he became First Secretary. Although from an old noble family, he owed his rise largely to his connexions with the Ferrero della Marmora family and with Archbishop Rorengo di Rorà of Turin, and to his marriage into the Lascaris di Ventimiglia family.

Perrone's residency in London was associated with a strong emphasis on Sardinia's commercial interests in Britain. In 1751 he was rewarded with the rank of cornet in a prestigious court regiment. In late 1752 and early 1753, he was involved with the negotiations between Charles Emmanuel III and Archbishop Herring regarding the possible translation of the relics of St Anselm from Canterbury Cathedral to Aosta in Sardinia (now Italy). The archbishop was not averse to the idea (Note: A letter of 23 December 1752 by Thomas Herring to John Lynch.) and Perron's investigation was of the opinion that Anselm's remains were probably intact and misidentified as Theobald's, (Note: A letter of 31 March 1753 by P. Bradley to Count Perron.) but the matter was uncertain (Note: A letter of 9 January 1753 by "S.S." (probably Samuel Shuckford but possibly Samuel Stedman) to Thomas Herring.) and seems to have been dropped. The archbishop's original plan to foist "any other old Bishop with the Name of Anselm" "on the Simpletons" was foiled by the ambassador's insistence that he personally witness any excavation to procure the remains. (Note: A letter of 6 January 1753 by Thomas Herring to John Lynch.)

Between 1755 and 1777, Perrone lived in semi-retirement. Although he continued to hold court and military titles, he spent his time looking after his own estates. In 1779 he was appointed to the Order of the Annunziata. In 1784, he used his connexions to secure the appointment of his son-in-law's brother, the Cavaliere Nomis di Pollone, as resident minister in London (until 1787).

== Bibliography ==
- Historical Manuscripts Commission (1901), Report on Manuscripts in Various Collections, Vol. I Berwick-upon-Tweed, Burford, and Lostwithiel Corporations; the Counties of Wilts and Worcester; the Bishop of Chichester; and the Deans and Chapters of Chichester, Canterbury, and Salisbury, London: Mackie & Co. for His Majesty's Stationery Office.
- Ollard, Sidney Leslie; et al., eds. (1931), Archbishop Herring's Visitation Returns 1743, Vol. V, (reprinted by Cambridge University Press 2013), ISBN 9781108058773.
- Storrs, Christopher (2000), "Savoyard Diplomacy in the Eighteenth Century (1684–1798)", in Daniela Frigo (ed.), Politics and Diplomacy in Early Modern Italy: The Structure of Diplomatic Practice, 1450–1800, Cambridge, pp. 210–53.
