= Duperron =

Duperron or du Perron is a demonym of the Perron region of northwestern France, and may refer to:

- Abraham Hyacinthe Anquetil-Duperron (1731–1805), French orientalist
- Dean Duperron, Canadian businessman
- Edgar du Perron (1899–1940), Dutch poet and author
- Jacques-Davy Duperron (1556–1618), French cardinal
- Louis-Pierre Anquetil-Duperron (1723–1808), French historian
- Thalour du Perron, Governor of Plaisance, Newfoundland from 1662 to 1664

== See also ==
- Perron (disambiguation)
