= Peron (disambiguation) =

Peron (or Perón, Péron) may refer to:

== People ==
- Alphonse Péron (1834–1908), French soldier and geologist
- Carlos Perón (born 1952), Swiss musician, founding member of the band Yello
- Eva Perón (1919–1952), former Argentine political leader First Lady, Spiritual Leader of the Nation, and head of the Eva Perón Foundation
- François Péron (1775–1810), French naturalist and explorer
- Isabel Perón (born 1931), Argentine former Vice President and President
- Jean-Hervé Péron (born 1949), frontman and bass player of several incarnations of German band "Faust"
- Juan Perón (1895–1974), former President of Argentina and founder of the Justicialist Party
- Patrice Péron (1949–2025), French rugby union player
- Pierre Péron (1905–1988), French artist
- Andrea Peron (cyclist, born 1971), Italian former professional road bicycle racer
- Andrea Peron (cyclist, born 1988), Italian professional road bicycle racer
- Dennis Peron (1945–2018), American gay medical marijuana activist and businessman

== Places ==
- Peron Islands, two low laying islands off the west coast of the Northern Territory of Australia
- Peron Peninsula, located in the Shark Bay World Heritage site in Western Australia
- Peron, Punjab, village in Indian Punjab
- Peron, Western Australia, outer southern suburb of Perth
- Cape Peron, headland located at the extreme southern end of Cockburn Sound in Western Australia
- Cape Peron, headland located in Francois Peron National Park
- Péron, Ain, commune in the department of Ain in eastern France

== Other ==
- Peron's tree frog
- An alternative name for the rocoto round chili pepper
- Older Peron transgression, warm climatic period

== See also ==
- Perron (disambiguation)
