= Mount Emilius =

Mountain in Italy

- French: Mont Émilius; Italian: Monte Emilius
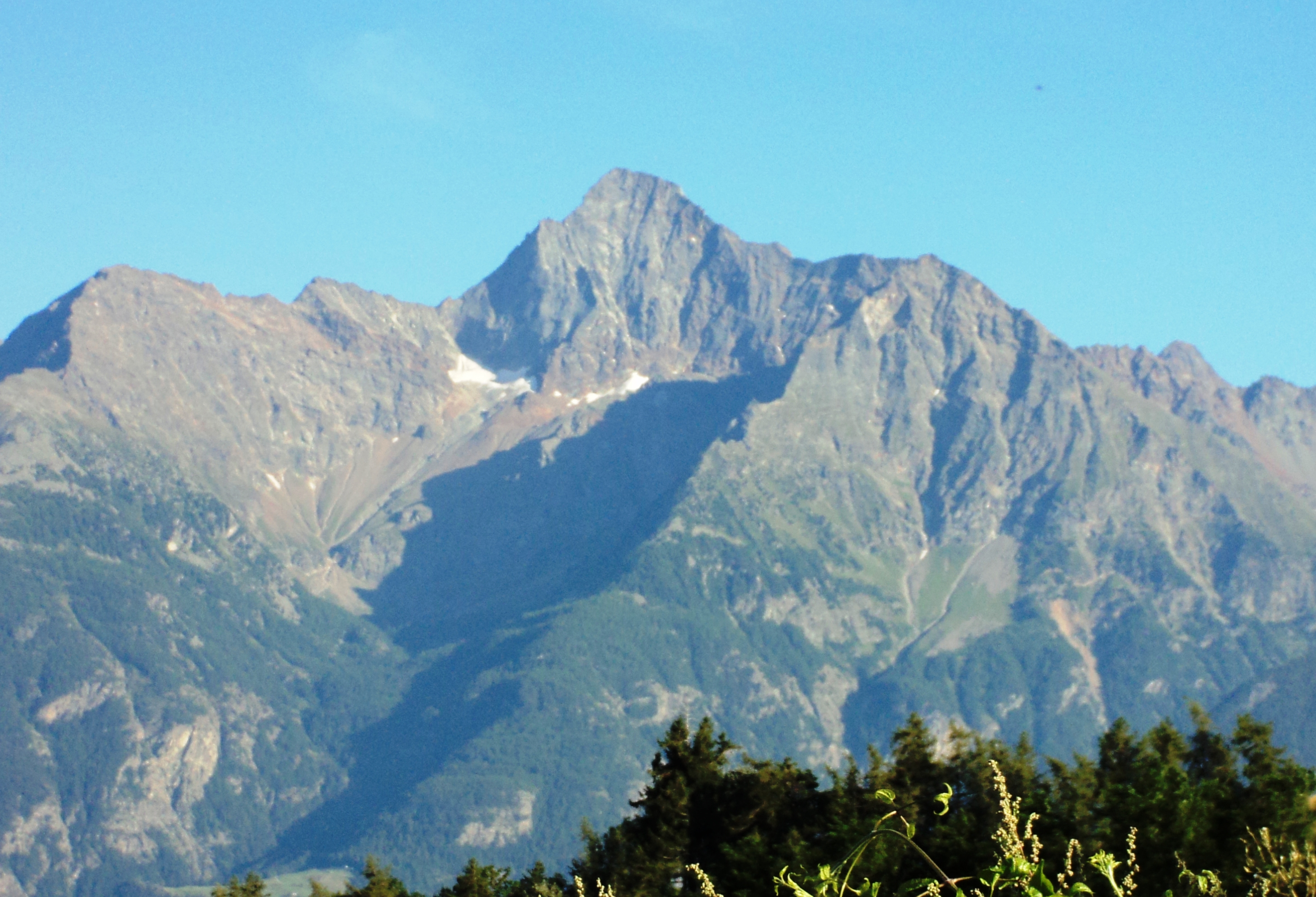
- Mount Emilius

Highest point
- Elevation: 3,559 m (11,677 ft)
- Prominence: 735 m (2,411 ft)
- Isolation: 12.56 km (7.80 mi)
- Listing: Alpine mountains above 3000 m
- Coordinates: 45°40′44.69″N 7°23′02.45″E

Geography
- Location within Alps
- Location: Aosta Valley, Italy
- Parent range: Graian Alps

Climbing
- First ascent: 1826, by Georges Carrel and Émilie Argentier
- Easiest route: From Pila

Mount Emilius (French: Mont Émilius, Italian: Monte Emilius) (3,559 m) is a mountain of the Graian Alps in Aosta Valley, north-western Italy. Located just above the town of Aosta, from where it is visible looking southwards behind the lower Becca di Nona, it is usually climbed starting from the ski resort of Pila, at a height of 1,870 m.

== History ==
This mountain was formerly known as Pic de dix heures, meaning "10 a.m. peak" in French, as the sun stands right on top of it at 10am, or even as Pic Chamosser or Pic Chamoisier. In 1839 the priest Georges Carrel (later prior of the Collegiate church of Saint Ursus) climbed the peak with a 14-year-old girl named Émilie Argentier, the daughter of the mountaineer and doctor Auguste Argentier (1830-1874) from Cogne, in order to promote mountaineering. The peak was thus named after her. Aostan canons thought about naming it Pic Pie in honour of Pope Pius IX, but decided against it as Pie in French also means magpie.

== Ascent ==
A marked path from Pila usually takes one to the summit, past various lakes, with a bit of scrambling involved. The view from the top includes famous peaks such as Mont Blanc, Monte Rosa, the Matterhorn and Grand Combin
