= James McEvoy (philosopher) =

Irish philosopher (1943–2010)

James Joseph McEvoy
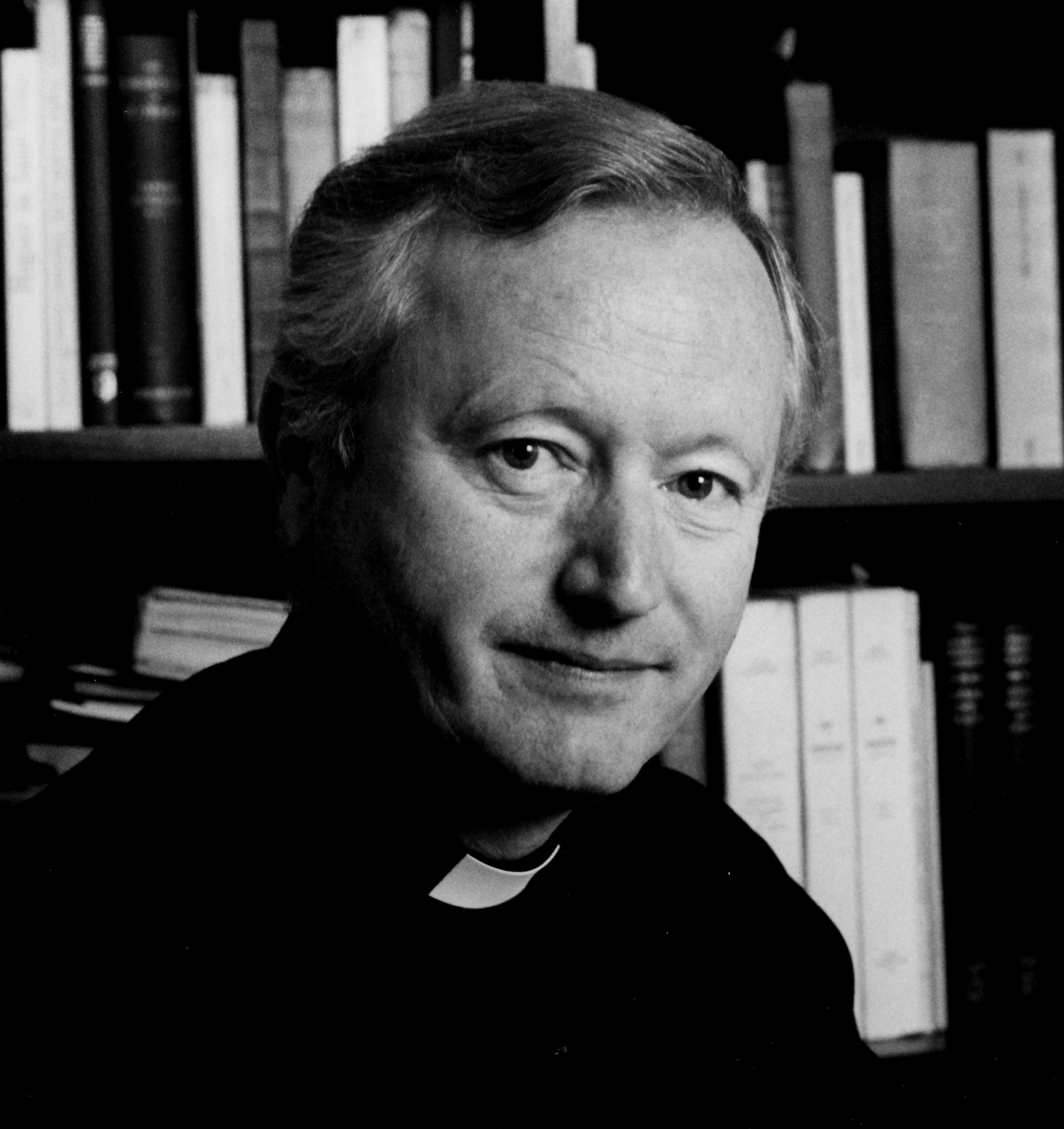
- Born: 14 October 1943; Larne, Northern Ireland
- Died: 2 October 2010 (aged 66); Belfast, Northern Ireland

Education
- Education: Queen’s University of Belfast St Patrick's College, Maynooth Université catholique de Louvain
- Thesis: (1974)

Philosophical work
- Era: Contemporary Philosophy
- Region: Western philosophy
- School: Christian Neo-Platonism

James J. McEvoy (14 October 1943 – 2 October 2010) was a Northern Irish philosopher and priest. His principal academic interests were related to medieval philosophy, particularly the work of John Scotus Eriugena and Robert Grosseteste. He also wrote about the philosophy of friendship.

== Biography ==
McEvoy undertook undergraduate and postgraduate study in the Department of Scholastic Philosophy at Queen’s University of Belfast, where he wrote his MA thesis on Robert Grosseteste's commentary on Pseudo-Dionysius the Areopagite's Celestial Hierarchy. He studied for his Bachelor of Divinity at St Patrick's College, Maynooth, and was ordained as a Catholic priest in 1968 for the Diocese of Down and Connor. In 1974, he was awarded his PhD by the Université catholique de Louvain for a dissertation on the philosophy of Grosseteste, which he wrote under the supervision of Fernand Van Steenberghen.

McEvoy held chairs of philosophy at The Queen’s University Belfast (1975–88), Louvain-la-Neuve (1988–95), and Maynooth (1995-2004). He served as dean of the Faculty of Philosophy of the National University of Ireland Maynooth. He was elected a member of the Royal Irish Academy in 1982 and conferred with an honorary Doctorate of Letters from the University of Leicester at Lincoln Cathedral in 2004, the same year that a volume on friendship, Amor amicitiae, was published in his honour.

== Bibliography ==
- The Philosophy of Robert Grosseteste (Clarendon Press, 1982)
- Robert Grosseteste: Exegete and Philosopher (Variorum, 1994)
- Roberti Grosseteste: New Perspectives on his Thought and Scholarship (Brepols, 1995)
- (ed.) Roberti Grosseteste: Expositio in Epistolam Sancti Pauli ad Galatas (Brepols, 1995)
- (ed., with J. Follon) Sagesses de l'amitié (2 vols, Editions du Cerf, 1997, 2003). An anthology of texts on friendship from Antiquity to the Renaissance.
- Robert Grosseteste, Great Medieval Thinkers Series (Oxford University Press, 2000)
- (ed., with Michael Dunne) History and Eschatology in John Scottus Eriugena and his Time (Leuven University Press, 2002)
- (ed.) Mystical Theology: The Glosses by Thomas Gallus and the Commentary of Robert Grosseteste on De Mystica Theologia (Peeters, 2003)
- (ed., with Maurice P. Hogan) The Mystery of Faith: Reflections on the Encyclical "Ecclesia de Eucharistia" (Columba Press, 2005)
- (ed., with Michael Dunne) The Irish Contribution to Scholastic Thought (Four Courts Press, 2009)
- (ed., with Declan Lawell and J. Stanley McQuade) Roberti Grosseteste Episcopi Lincolniensis Versio Caelestis Hierarchiae Pseudo-Dionysii Areopagitae (Brepols, 2015)
