= E. M. Wilmot-Buxton =

UK author

- Born: 1870
- Died: 1923 (aged 52–53)
- Occupations: author and teacher

E. M. Wilmot-Buxton (Ethel Mary Wilmot-Buxton) (1870–1923) was an author, translator and school teacher.

Wilmot-Buxton studied at Hughes Hall, Cambridge. While there she founded the Marsh Marigold Tramp Club in 1894. The aim was to undertake an annual walking tour in the English countryside. In Easter 1894 she led a 3-week trip by some students to the Alps. She later became a teacher at Brighton High School for Girls. She also became an author of historical factual books for children, as well as contributing to some collections of short stories and translations. She was a fellow of the Royal Historical Society.

== Publications ==
Wilmot-Buxton was a prolific author of well over 30 books. They were mainly factual works about history or religion aimed at children and schools, but she also re-wrote stories from some classic literature such as Norse sagas and the Mabinogion. Her first published work was in collections of short stories. She was also the author of at least one translation from French. She also wrote at least one original historical novel, The Red Queen, set during the reign of Elizabeth I.

=== Histories and folklore ===
- E.M. Wilmot-Buxton, (1927) The struggle with the crown (1603–1715). Illustrated by May Gibbs. London: George G. Harrap.
- E.M. Wilmot-Buxton, (1923) The Red Queen. Burns Oates & Washbourne Ltd, London
- E.M. Wilmot-Buxton, (1922) Alcuin, P.J. Kennedy & Sons, New York.
- E.M. Wilmot-Buxton, (1921) A Short World History, E.P. Dutton and Company, New York.
- E.M. Wilmot-Buxton, (1920) A little book of St. Francis & his brethren.
- E.M. Wilmot-Buxton, (1919) A Social History of England, from Anglo-Saxon times, for upper and middle forms, E.P. Dutton and Company, New York.
- E.M. Wilmot-Buxton, (1915) Anselm, Illustrated by Morris Meredith Williams, George G. Harrap & Company, London.
- E.M. Wilmot-Buxton, (1914) Jeanne d'Arc, Frederick A. Stokes Company, New York.
- E.M. Wilmot-Buxton, (1911) Wales. Peeps at many lands and cities series. Illustrated Robert Fowler. Adam & Charles Black, United Kingdom.
- E.M. Wilmot-Buxton, (1910) Told by the Northmen: Stories from the Eddas and Sagas, George G. Harrap & Company, London.
- E.M. Wilmot-Buxton, (1909) Old Celtic tales, George G. Harrap & Company, London.
- E.M. Wilmot-Buxton, (1908) The Story of the Crusades, George G. Harrap & Company, London.
- E.M. Wilmot-Buxton, (1907) Stories of early England, T.Y. Crowell & Co, New York.

=== Translations ===
- E. M. Wilmot-Buxton, Stories from Old French Romance, New York, Stokes, (no date).

=== Anthology contributions ===
- Jack Frost's Little Prisoners: A Collection of Stories for Children from Four to Twelve Years of Age (1887) Stella Austin, S. Baring-Gould, Caroline Birley, Edward Hugessen Knatchbull-Hugessen Brabourne, Mrs. Massey, Anne Thackeray Ritchie, E. M. Wilmot-Buxton, and Charlotte M. Yonge
- My Birthday Present: A Series of Original Birthday Stories for Boys and Girls from Six to Twelve Years of Age (1886) Contributors: Sabine Baring-Gould, Caroline Birley, Helen Wilmot-Buxton, E. M. Wilmot-Buxton, Frances Charlton and Frances Clare.
