= Émile Chanoux square =

City square in Aosta, Italy

Coordinates: 45.7372°N 7.3203°E

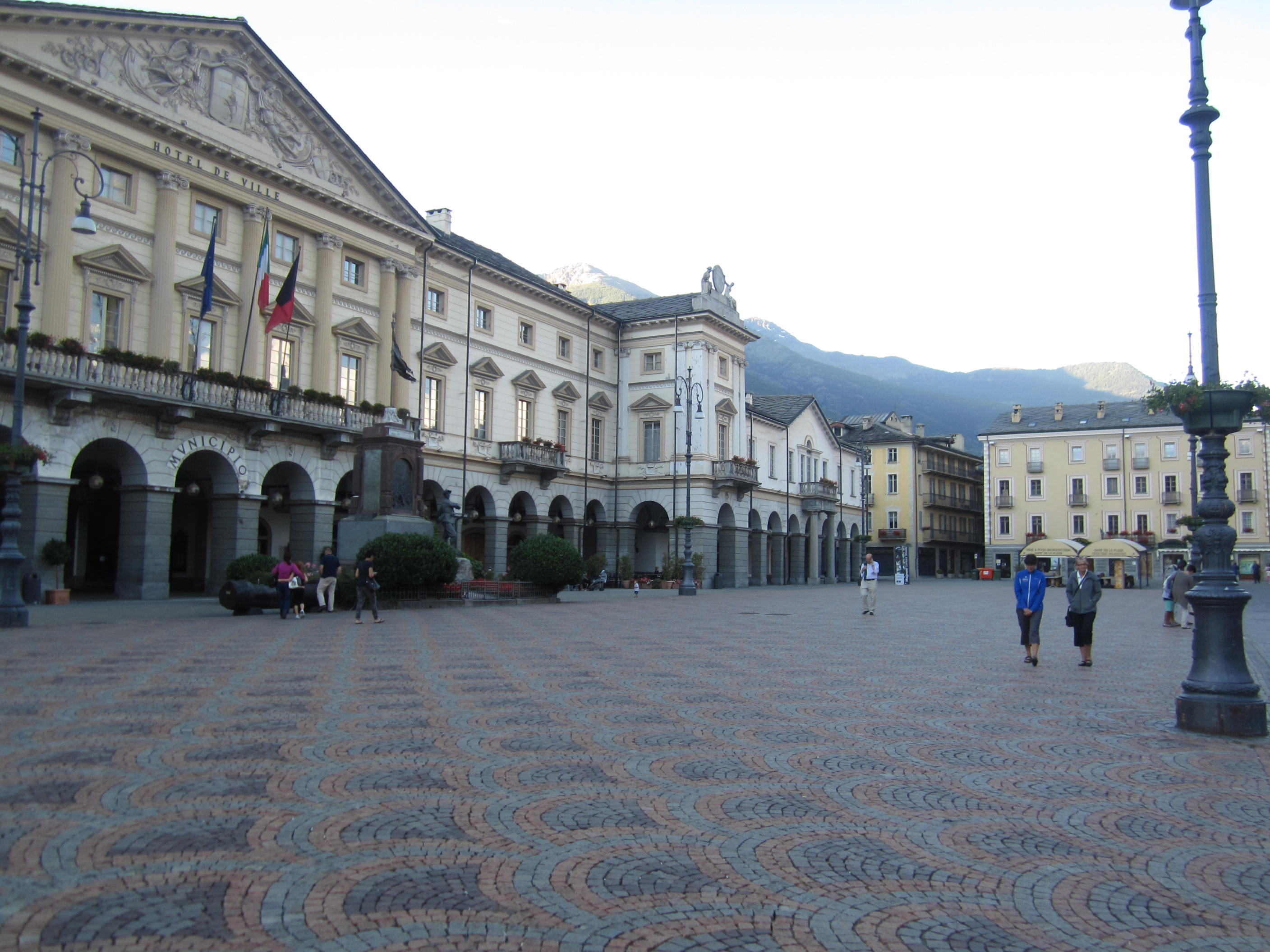
Émile Chanoux square

Émile Chanoux square (French pronunciation: [emil ʃanu], French: Place Émile Chanoux, Italian: Piazza Émile Chanoux) is a city square in Aosta, Italy.
