= John Lynch (dean of Canterbury) =

John Lynch (1697–1760), of The Groves at Staple, Kent, was an 18th-century Church of England clergyman, Royal chaplain to the King (1727–34) Dean of Canterbury (1734–60) and Archdeacon of Canterbury.

Lynch was born on 5 December 1697, son of Colonel. John Lynch Esq of The Groves at Staple, Kent (d. 1733) and his wife, Hon. Sarah Head daughter of Sir Francis Head, Baronet of The Great Hermitage at Rochester in Kent. He was educated at the King's School, Canterbury, and then St John's College, Cambridge, (1714; BA 1718; MA 1721; DD 1728). He was ordained deacon in Norwich (1721).

In 1723 his patron, Archbishop William Wake, appointed Lynch to the Chapter of Canterbury Cathedral (Stall IV) and as rector of All Hallows, Bread Street, London. He was rector of Sundridge (Kent) from 1725 to 1733 and a chaplain to the king from 1727 to 1734.

Lynch married the archbishop's daughter, Mary, in 1728 and received further preferment, including appointment as master of the Hospital of St Cross, Winchester, rector of All Hallows the Great (London) (1730-2), rector of Ickham, Kent (1731–60), rector of Eynesford, Kent (1731–60), rector of Bishopsbourne, Kent (1731–60), master of Harbledown Hospital, Canterbury (1731) and treasurer of Salisbury Cathedral (1735–60).

On the death of Elias Sydall, Lynch was appointed Dean of Canterbury. He was criticised in his lifetime as a notorious pluralist. An anonymous satirical pamphlet (The Life of Dean L---nch, 1748) was published attacking him. In exoneration, H.J. Todd in his Some account of the deans of Canterbury (1793) comments: "Large as his Income may appear, yet his expenses were equal to his revenues. On his Prebendal and Deanery Houses he had expended no less than £3000. And his private charities were known to equal his public spirit". Todd notes also that Lynch had been an early supporter of the Society for the Support of the Widows and Orphans of the Clergy.

Church of England titles
Preceded by Elias Sydall	Dean of Canterbury; 1734-1760	Succeeded by William Freind
