= Foligno (disambiguation) =

Foligno is a town in the region of Umbria, Italy, in the Province of Perugia.

Foligno may also refer to:

== People ==
- Marcus Foligno (born 1991), Canadian ice hockey player
- Mike Foligno (born 1959), Canadian ice hockey player
- Nick Foligno (born 1987), American ice hockey player
- Angela of Foligno (1248 – 4 January 1309), Italian Franciscan tertiary
- Felician of Foligno (c. 160 – c. 250), patron saint of Foligno
- Gentile da Foligno (died 18 June 1348), Italian professor and doctor of medicine
- Angelo da Foligno (1226 - 27 August 1312), Italian Roman Catholic priest

== Other ==
- Foligno Airport
- Foligno Cathedral
- A.S.D. Città di Foligno 1928
- Madonna of Foligno, Italian High Renaissance painting
- Roman Catholic Diocese of Foligno
