= Bertoldo (name) =

Bertoldo is an Italian origin word which is used as a surname and a masculine given name. Notable people with the name include:

== Surname ==
- Arduino Bertoldo (1932–2012), Italian Roman Catholic bishop
- Fellipe Bertoldo (born 1991), Brazilian football player
- Sperindio Bertoldo (c. 1530–1570), Italian organist and composer
- Vito Bertoldo (1916–1966), American soldier

== Given name ==
- Bertoldo Batawang, Jr. (born 1971), commonly known as Bert Batawang, Filipino boxer
- Bertoldo di Giovanni (after 1420–1491), Italian sculptor and medallist
- Bertoldo Klinger (1884–1969), Brazilian army general

== See also ==
- Bertoldo (disambiguation)
