= Maturino (name) =

Maturino is both a given name and a surname. Notable people with the name include:

== Given names ==
- Maturino Blanchet (1892-1974), Italian Roman Catholic bishop
- Maturino da Firenze (1490-1528), Italian painter

== Middle names ==
- Ángel Maturino Reséndiz (1960-2006), Mexican serial killer
