= Ovidio Lari =

Italian Catholic bishop

His Excellency, The Most Reverend Ovidio Lari
- Bishop of Aosta
- Diocese: Diocese of Aosta
- Appointed: 15 October 1968
- Installed: 8 December 1968
- Term ended: 30 December 1994
- Predecessor: Maturino Blanchet
- Successor: Giuseppe Anfossi

Orders
- Ordination: 10 August 1941
- Consecration: 30 November 1968 by Marino Bergonzini

Personal details
- Born: 2 January 1919 Fabbrica, Peccioli, Tuscany
- Died: 2 February 2007 (aged 88) Peccioli, Tuscany
- Denomination: Roman Catholic

Ordination history of Ovidio Lari
History
Episcopal consecration
- Principal consecrator: Marino Bergonzini
- Co-consecrators: Abele Conigli; Carlo Colombo

Ovidio Lari (2 January 1919 – 2 February 2007) was an Italian ordinary of the Catholic Church and the Bishop of Aosta.

== Biography ==
Ovidio Lari was born on 2 January 1919 in the frazione of Fabbrica in Peccioli, a comune in the Province of Pisa and the Diocese of Volterra, both of which are in the Italian region of Tuscany.

=== Priestly ministry ===
He was ordained a priest on 10 August 1941, after which he became the chaplain of the Cathedral of Volterra. He also received a Doctor of Theology from the Pontifical University of Saint Thomas Aquinas in Rome.

Lari served as a professor of literature, philosophy, and theology at seminary of Volterra from 1941 to 1968 and as a professor of letters at the Pontifical Regional Seminary "Pius XII" in Siena from 1955 to 1958.

He was director of the weekly magazine of the Diocese of Volterra, L'Araldo (English: The Herald), from 1953 to 1968 and was the canon of the Cathedral of Volterra from 1948 to 1968.

He has participated as an expert in the Second Vatican Council with the Bishop of Volterra, Marino Bergonzini.

=== Episcopal ministry ===
On 15 October 1968, Pope Paul VI appointed Lari as the Bishop of Aosta, succeeding Mathurin Blanchet. He received his episcopal ordination on 30 November, Bishop Marino Bergonzini acting as the principal consecrator and Bishops Abele Conigli and Carlo Colombo as co-consecrators. He was installed in the diocese on 8 December of that year.

During his episcopate, he welcomed a pastoral visit from Pope John Paul II in 1986 during his vacation in Les Combes. He also visited all the parishes the diocese and repeatedly called for a diocesan synod, which was held from 1988 to 1993.

On 30 December 1994, Pope John Paul II accepted his resignation due to age. He was succeeded as Bishop of Aosta by Giuseppe Anfossi. Lari retired at first to Castelfiorentino and then to the Fabbrica frazione of Peccioli, where he died on 2 February 2007. The funeral was held on 5 February in the Cathedral of Volterra and on 6 February in the Cathedral of Aosta and he was buried in the Aosta Valley town.

Catholic Church titles
Preceded by Maturino Blanchet O.M.I.	Bishop of Aosta; 1968–1994	Succeeded by Giuseppe Anfossi
