= Messala =

Messala or Messalla may refer to:

- Ennodius Messala, a Roman senator in Ostrogothic Italy
- Messala Merbah (born 1994), Algerian footballer who plays for JS Saoura as a midfielder
- Marcus Silius Messala, a Roman Politician, senator and suffect consul towards the end of the 2nd century
- Valerii Messallae
- Mashallah ibn Athari (died 815 AD), astronomer
  - Messala (crater) on the Moon, named after the astronomer
- Messala Severus, a character in the novel Ben-Hur
- A character in the manga version of the film Big Tits Zombie
- A Mobile Suit that appears in the anime series Mobile Suit Zeta Gundam

== See also ==
- Messalina (disambiguation), diminutive form
