= Saint Felicianus =

Saint Felicianus may refer to:

- See Primus and Felician, for the martyrs Felicianus and Primus
- Felician of Foligno (ca. AD 160–ca. AD 250), patron saint of Foligno
