= Porfirio Feliciani =

Italian Roman Catholic Bishop

Most Reverend Porfirio Feliciani
- Bishop of Foligno
- Church: Catholic Church
- Diocese: Diocese of Foligno
- In office: 1612–1634
- Predecessor: Francesco Simonetta
- Successor: Cristoforo Caetani

Orders
- Consecration: 1 May 1612 by Scipione Borghese

Personal details
- Died: 2 October 1634 Foligno, Italy

Porfirio Feliciani (19 April 1554 – 2 October 1634) was a Roman Catholic prelate who served as Bishop of Foligno (1612–1634).

Feliciani was born in Perugia on 19 April 1554. He studied philosophy, mathematics, astrology before graduating with a doctorate in jurisprudence from the University of Perugia. His life can be reconstructed from the 26 volumes of his correspondence preserved in the Biblioteca Angelica in Rome. From 1580 to 1602, he served Cardinal Anton Maria Salviati.

On 2 April 1612, Feliciani was appointed during the papacy of Pope Paul V as Bishop of Foligno. On 1 May 1612, he was consecrated bishop by Scipione Borghese, Archpriest of the Arcibasilica di San Giovanni in Laterano with Fabio Biondi, Titular Patriarch of Jerusalem, and Ulpiano Volpi, Archbishop of Chieti, serving as co-consecrators. He served as Bishop of Foligno until his death on 2 October 1634. He was buried in Foligno Cathedral.

In 1630, Feliciani published a collection of poems, Rime diverse morali e spirituali, dedicated to Cardinal Francesco Barberini.

== External links and additional sources ==
- Chow, Gabriel. "Diocese of Foligno (Italy)". GCatholic.org. (for Chronology of Bishops) ^{[self-published]}

Catholic Church titles
Preceded by Francesco Simonetta	Bishop of Foligno; 1612–1634	Succeeded by Cristoforo Caetani
