= Tour de Villa Castle =

Castle in Gressan, Italy

- Tour de Ville (French); Tour des Pauvres (French)
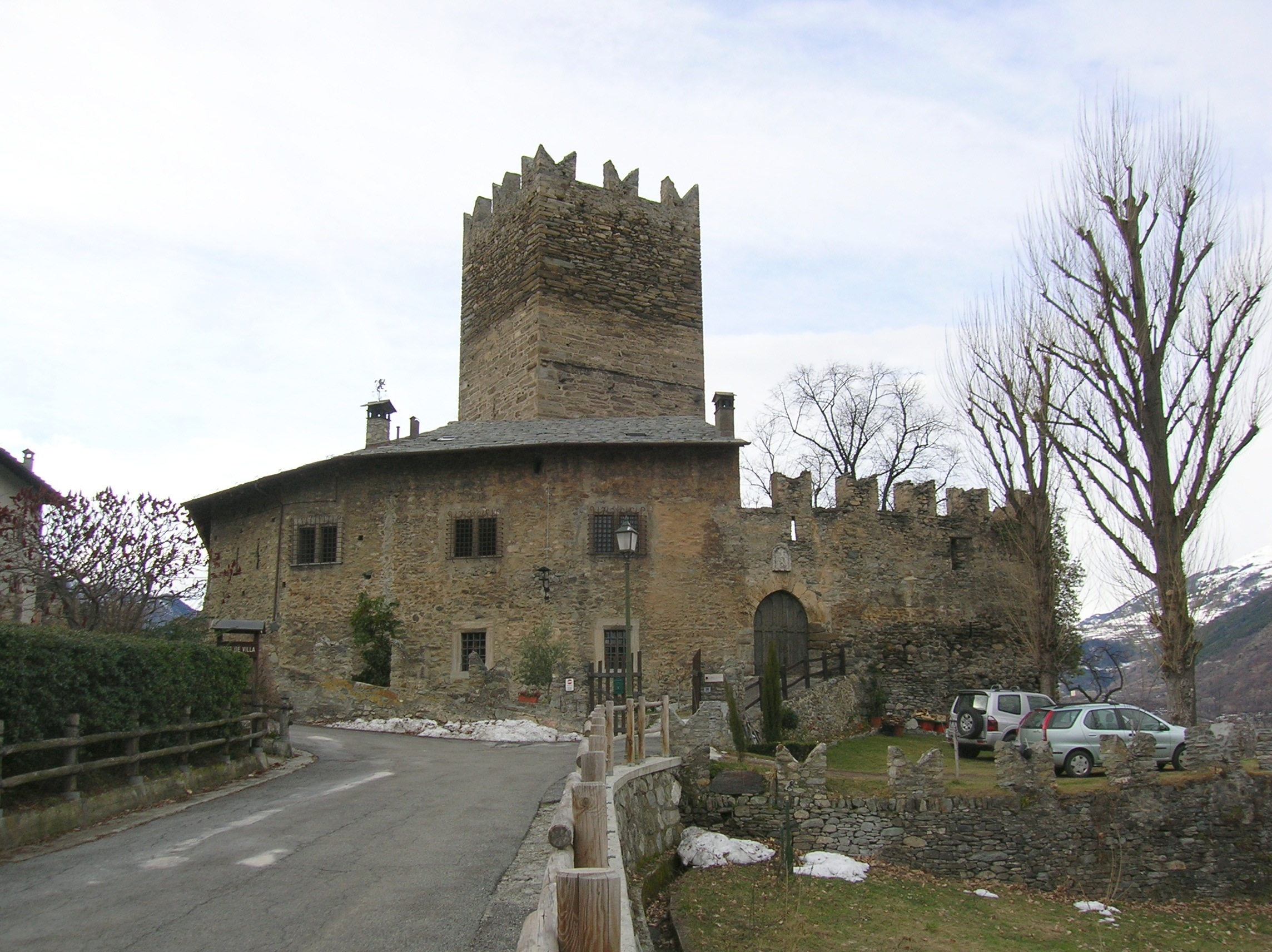
- Tour de Villa Castle east face
- Interactive map of Tour de Villa Castle
- 45°42′53″N 7°17′00″E
- Location: Gressan, Aosta Valley, Italy

History
- Built: 12th century

Site notes
- Owner: Arruga family

The Tour de Villa Castle (French: Tour de Ville), also long called the Tower of the Poor (French: Tour des Pauvres), is a private castle in the municipality of Gressan, Aosta Valley.

It stands on a modest granite rock on the gentle slope that also hosts the village, west of the Côte de Gargantua, the lateral moraine of the Pila basin glacier at the end of the Gressan stream impluvium.

It is a little-known medieval-era castle, partly because compared with other Aosta Valley castles, such as the regionally managed Fénis Castle or Issogne Castle, this one is less imposing though in excellent condition, and was until 2011 inhabited by its owners and not open to visitors. Already visible from the regional road of Gressan (SR 20), nestled among the apple orchards and vineyards that characterize the fertile municipal territory, it can be reached by taking the road to the hamlet of the same name; from it, the De la Plantaz Tower towards the valley and the Sainte-Marie-Magdeleine church, with its façade frescoed in 1453, towards the east are easily reached with a short walk.

== Architecture ==
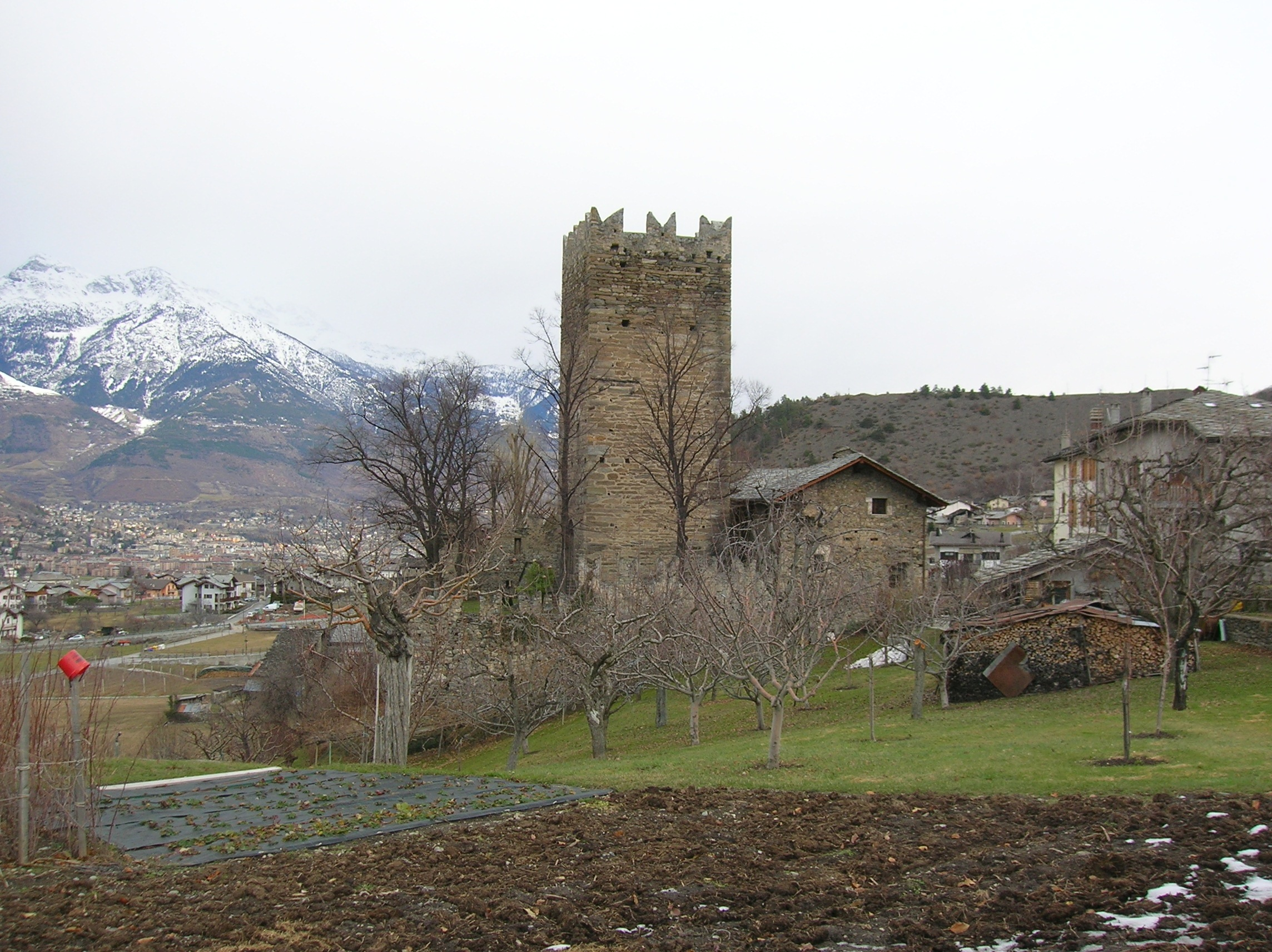
Back of the castle, northwest side.

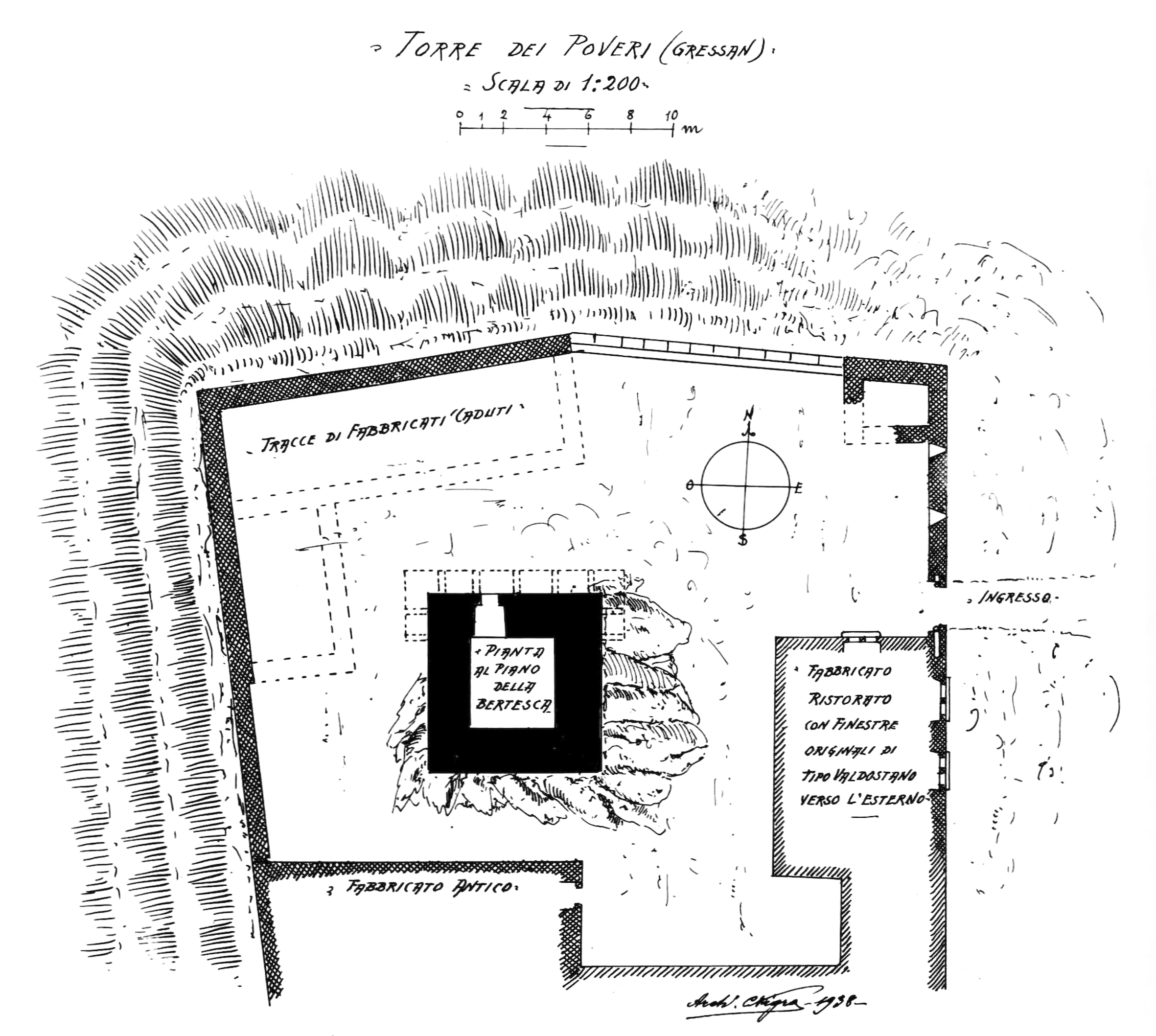
Floor plan, 1938 relief by Carlo Nigra.

The castle, originally consisting only of the 12th-century square-based tower, was erected with tufa blocks and granite-schist ashlars. The absence of windows, creating a consequent absence of light, was made up for by the adoption of loopholes; the original door, raised on the north side and accessed by a double wooden escalator, is 7 meters higher than the one added in current times and is in the same style as the one in the nearby De la Plantaz Tower; above the door one can still notice the original brackets that supported the sleeper, that is, the horizontal wooden beam for distributing the load of the structure, on which a wooden bertesca rested, as can be guessed from the holes in the wall for the supports. The tower thus ends with a lead platform roof, a kind of belvedere over the plain.

The tower was surrounded by a “short crenellated wall enclosure.”

The castle tower, once the stringent defensive necessity had fallen away, was then expanded with a semicircular building body in the 15th century, used as a three-story residential area, and today it appears in two bodies quite distinct from each other: the 12th-century one and the 15th-century one.

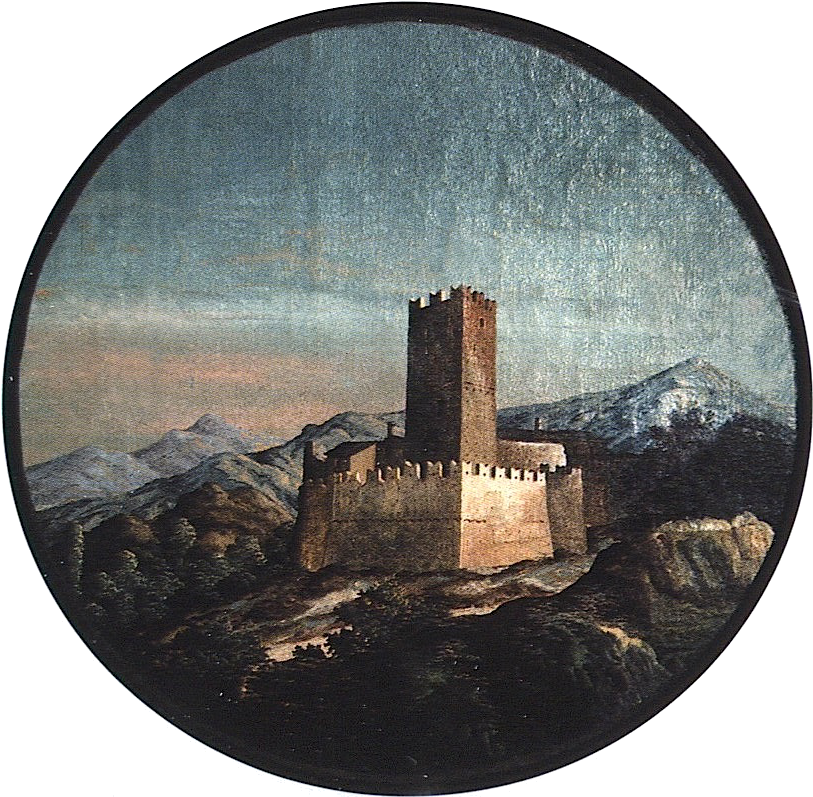
The castle after restoration in the late 19th century painting by an anonymous artist.

The Tour de Villa castle was reduced to ruins for a long time. During abandonment, the northwestern part was lost, now replaced by a courtyard. During a restoration it was raised and adorned with new battlements. Later, Monsignor Duc, bishop of Aosta, wanted to turn it into a summer residence by making heavy interventions: he had part of the walls knocked down to replace them with a crenellated parapet and had a door added at street level, while he preserved two twin windows, in the Valdostan style and provided with grilles, on the second floor of the body of the building that abuts the tower.

=== Internal area ===
Inside, the tower consists of three floors, one of which is occupied by the wooden barn accessible by a spiral staircase.

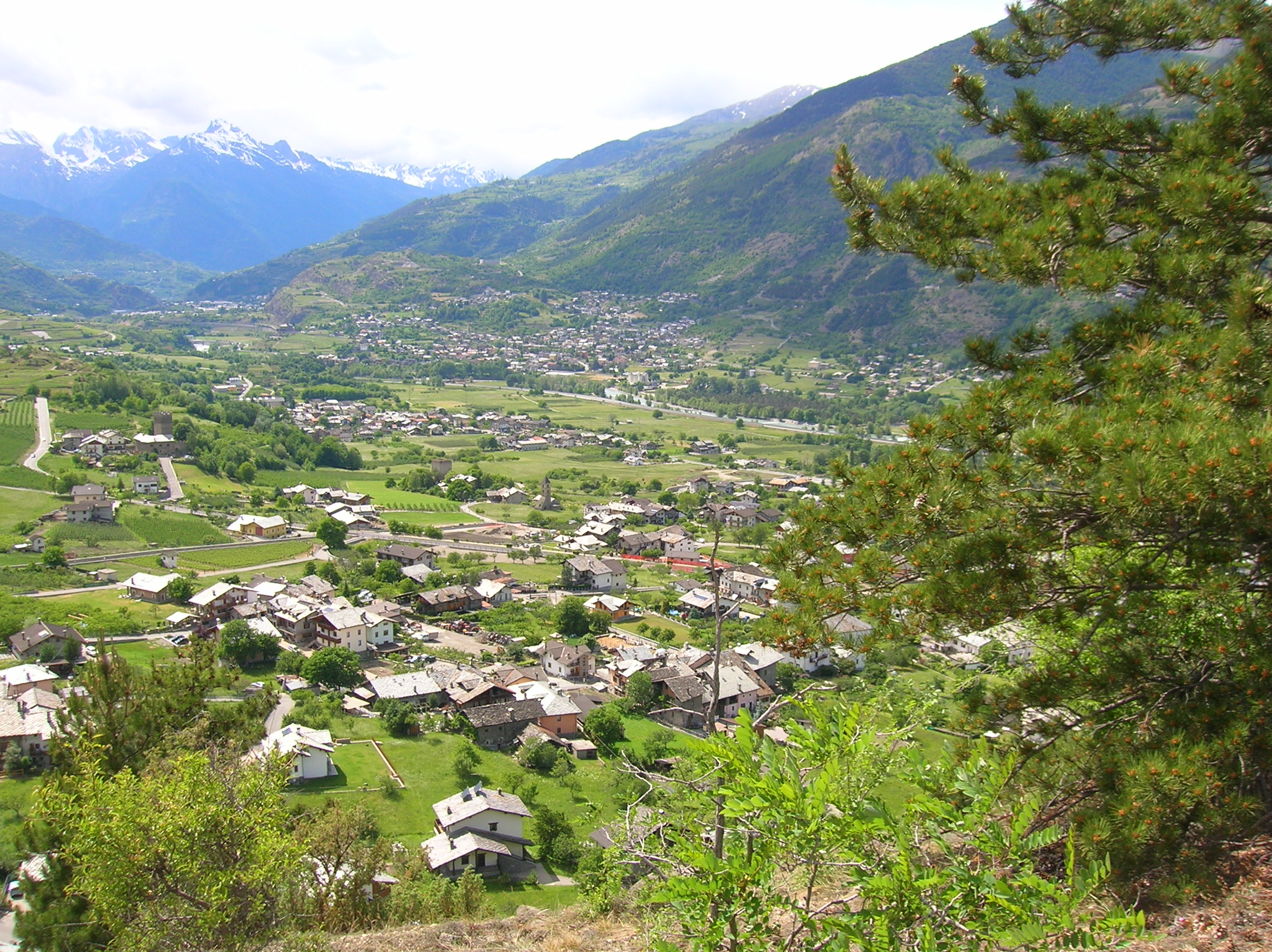
The castle, De la Plantaz Tower, and Madelaine Church in the scattered village of Gressan, seen from the moraine. The Tour de Ville is located in the middle of the photo, from the left side.

The Renaissance residential body, on the other hand, houses a monumental hall for receptions, a chapel frescoed with paintings due to the Artari, a hall of coats of arms with the representation in succession of the coats of arms of the Savoy and of the noble families of the Aosta Valley, as are also visible in the courtyard of Issogne Castle.

== History ==
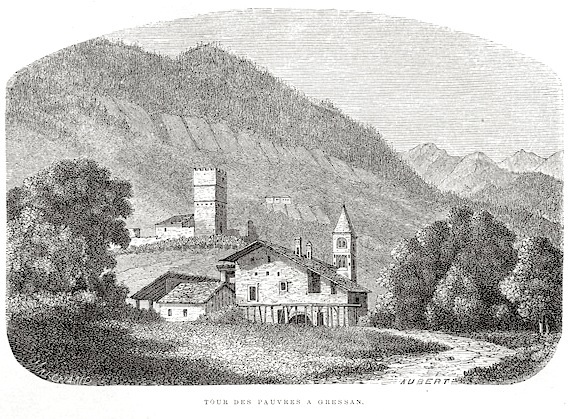
The “tour des Pauvres in Gressan” and the Madelaine church in an 1860 woodcut by Édouard Aubert.

The castle, according to François-Gabriel Frutaz, echoed by historian Giuseppe Giacosa, took its name from the de Villa family in Gressan (or de La Tour de Villa) who had it built around 1191. Of the 220 noble families in Valle d'Aosta, the de La Tour de Villa was among the oldest: in fact, the family of the Seigneurs de Villa is one of the 10 known to have been present between 1000 and 1200. It is also known that in the 13th century this family held the office of vice-domini of Aosta.

Although the castle was certainly built around the 12th century, there is not an exact construction date.

Perhaps because of this, tradition has it that the lordship of Villa belonged to Gundulph de La Tour, who was also linked to Gressan by the tower of the same name.

According to historiography, the La Tour de Villa bequeathed it to the Aymonier family and later passed to the Carrel family. It got its name Tour des Pauvres from its next owner, the parish of Saint Laurent of Aosta, which disposed of it in the poorhouse. After a period of decay, in 1864 it passed to Vincent Carlin, who in 1885 gave it to the bishop of Aosta Joseph-Auguste Duc, who restored it and turned it into his summer residence. The castle belonged to the bishopric of Aosta and in 1921 to Baron Gerbore of the noble family of Saint-Nicolas.

Since 1945 it has been owned by the Arruga family of Milan, Italy.

The castle, which until 2011 was private and not open to visitors, has been converted into an accommodation facility and hosts temporary exhibitions; in 2012, part of the events for the Culture Festival of the Municipality of Gressan were held there.

== See also ==
- Gressan
- Aosta Valley

== Bibliography ==
- Giacosa, Giuseppe (1905). I castelli valdostani [Castles from Vale d'Aosta] (in Italian). Milan: L. F. Cogliati.
- Nigra, Carlo (2001). Guida ai castelli della Val d'Aosta [A guide to Valle d'Aosta castles] (in Italian). CdN. ISBN 88-509-0050-3.
- Minola, Mauro; Ronco, Beppe (2002). Valle d'Aosta. Castelli e fortificazioni [Valle d'Aosta. Castles and fortresses] (in Italian). Varese: Macchione Edizioni. ISBN 88-8340-116-6.
- Zanotto, André (2002). Castelli valdostani [Castles from Valle d'Aosta] (in Italian). Quart: Musumeci. ISBN 88-7032-049-9.
- Brocherel, Jules (1930). Castelli valdostani [Castles from Valle d'Aosta] (in Italian). Aosta: Augusta Praetoria.
- Nigra, Carlo (1974). Torri e castelli e case forti del Piemonte dal 1000 al secolo XVI [Towers and castles and forts in Piedmont from 1000 to the 16th century] (in Italian). Quart: Musumeci.
