= Bertoldo (disambiguation) =

Bertoldo was a biweekly magazine of surreal humor between 14 July 1936 to 10 September 1943. It may also refer to:

- Bertoldo, Bertoldino e Cacasenno, 1984 Italian movie
- Bertoldo, story by Italian author Giulio Cesare Croce
- Bertoldo (name), list of people with the name
