= Filippo Trenta =

Filippo Trenta (21 April 1731 - March 1793) was a Roman Catholic prelate, jurist, and poet who served as Bishop of Foligno (3 April 1785 – 4 March 1796).

== Biography ==
He was born to an aristocratic family from Ascoli Piceno, he became a papal auditor in Lucca, Genoa, and Macerata. He finally became an auditor in Bologna under Cardinal Ignazio Gaetano Boncompagni. He published some lyric works of poetry, including:

- Tragedie (Lucca 1766)
- Limon sive Urbanarum Auaestionum libri tres (Rome 1782)

In 1784, 53 year of age, he was ordained a priest; and within a year named bishop of Foligno.
