= Francesco Simonetta =

Most Reverend Francesco Simonetta
- Bishop of Foligno
- Church: Catholic Church
- Diocese: Diocese of Foligno
- In office: 1606–1612
- Predecessor: Marcantonio Bizzoni
- Successor: Porfirio Feliciani
- Previous post: Apostolic Nuncio to Poland (1606–1612)

Orders
- Consecration: 23 July 1606 by Girolamo Bernerio

Personal details
- Born: Milan, Italy
- Died: 1612 Foligno, Italy

Francesco Simonetta (died 1612) was a Roman Catholic prelate who served as Bishop of Foligno (1606–1612) and Apostolic Nuncio to Poland (1606–1612).

== Biography ==
Francesco Simonetta was born in Milan, Italy. On 17 July 1606, he was appointed during the papacy of Pope Paul V as Bishop of Foligno. On 23 July 1606, he was consecrated bishop by Girolamo Bernerio, Cardinal-Bishop of Albano, with Galeazzo Sanvitale, Archbishop Emeritus of Bari-Canosa, and Alessandro Guidiccioni (iuniore), Bishop of Lucca, serving as co-consecrators. On 16 September 1606, he was appointed Apostolic Nuncio to Poland. He served as Bishop of Foligno until his death in 1612.

== External links and additional sources ==
- Cheney, David M. "Nunciature to Poland". Catholic-Hierarchy.org. (for Chronology of Bishops) ^{[self-published]}
- Chow, Gabriel. "Apostolic Nunciature Poland". GCatholic.org. (for Chronology of Bishops) ^{[self-published]}
- Cheney, David M. "Diocese of Foligno". Catholic-Hierarchy.org. (for Chronology of Bishops) ^{[self-published]}
- Chow, Gabriel. "Diocese of Foligno (Italy)". GCatholic.org. (for Chronology of Bishops) ^{[self-published]}

Catholic Church titles
Preceded by Claudio Rangoni (bishop of Reggio Emilia)	Apostolic Nuncio to Poland; 1606–1612	Succeeded by Lelio Ruini
Preceded by Marcantonio Bizzoni	Bishop of Foligno; 1606–1612	Succeeded by Porfirio Feliciani
