= Aosta-Pila gondola =

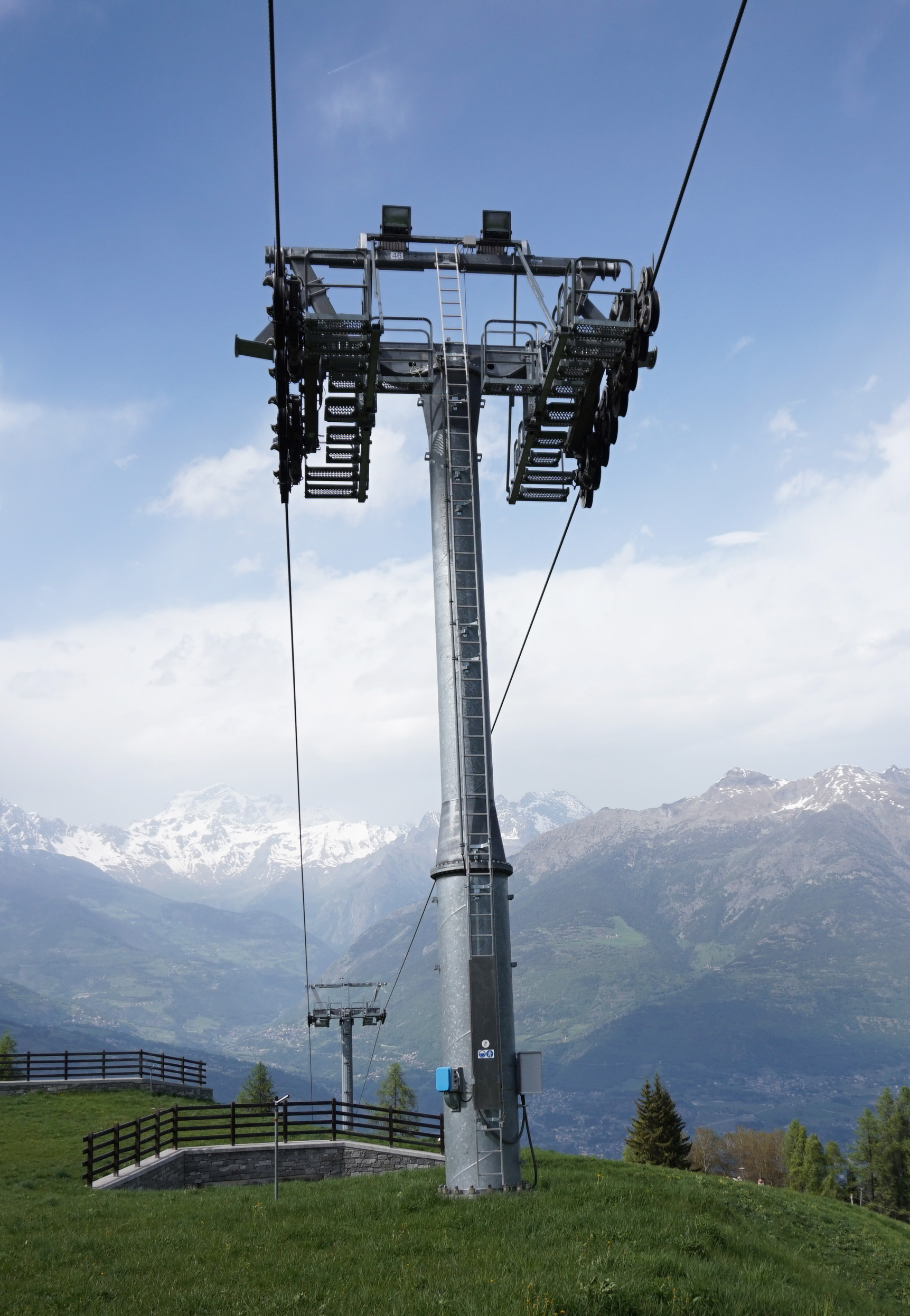
Aosta-Pila gondola mast. On the background, the Grand Combin.

The Aosta-Pila gondola is a cable transport system connecting the city of Aosta, Italy, to the Pila ski resort.

== Description ==
Opened in 1957 and renovated several times, it requires 20 minutes to cover a distance of 5 km over an altitude difference of 1200 meters. It has two intermediate stations at Les Fleurs and Plan-Praz. The starting point in Aosta can be reached within a 15-minute walk from the Émile Chanoux main square of the city, Aosta railway station and the bus terminal. A large parking lot is also available near the ticket office.

The gondola is open during the winter and summer season, in spring and autumn it closes for maintenance operations and safety checks.

The current gondola was built in 2008 by manufacturer Leitner, it can accommodate up to 8 people and can reach a speed of 6 meters per second. It has a transportation capacity of 2400 people per hour.
