= Laurent Chappis =

French architect and town planner

Laurent Chappis (8 May 1915 – 28 December 2013) was a French architect and town planner. He was born in Aix-les-Bains, France in May 1915. He created the French ski resort of Courchevel located in the Trois Vallées and in doing so practically wrote the rule book on how to design a ski resort. Chappis was a keen ski tourer exploring the mountains around Grenoble in the 1930s before joining the army and serving in the early stages of World War II. A decorated war hero he was captured in an attack on a German position in the final days before the French surrender and served five years in a PoW camp in Austria.

He completed his doctorate in captivity, the subject was the development of a ski resort in the Trois Vallées area. His ideas were often controversial, especially with developers more concerned with profits than aesthetics. This led him to be nicknamed the Anarchitecte. In the 1960s he was appointed as a United Nations expert on mountain development. A nomination that came not from his native France but from Italy. Chappis is also credited along with the architect Denis Pradelle with creating a modern, functional style of mountain architecture which rejected both traditional Savoie styles and the Tyrolean chalet style of architecture.

== Works ==
Laurent Chappis worked on studies in many countries including France, Italy, Argentina, Morocco, Soviet Union and Yugoslavia, his most notable works are:

- Courchevel
- Chamrousse - Le village d'enfants de Bachaboulou
- San Sicario - Clos de la Chapelle
- Pila Gressan - Residence Gorraz
