= Giovanni Benedetti =

Italian prelate

The Most Reverend Giovanni Benedetti
- Bishop of the Diocese of Foligno
- Church: Roman Catholic Church
- See: Diocese of Foligno
- In office: 1976–1992
- Predecessor: Siro Silvestri
- Successor: Arduino Bertoldo
- Previous post: Auxiliary bishop

Orders
- Ordination: 26 May 1940

Personal details
- Born: 12 March 1917 Spello, Italy
- Died: 3 August 2017 (aged 100) Foligno, Italy

Styles of Giovanni Benedetti
- Reference style: His Excellency
- Spoken style: Your Excellency
- Religious style: Bishop

Giovanni Benedetti (12 March 1917 – 3 August 2017) was an Italian prelate of Roman Catholic Church. He was Bishop of Foligno for more than 26 years.

== Biography ==
Benedetti was born in Spello, Italy, in 1917, ordained a priest of the Archdiocese of Venice on 26 May 1940. Pope Paul VI named him auxiliary bishop of the Diocese of Perugia and titular bishop of Limata on 12 December 1974 and consecrated on 23 January 1975. On 25 March 1976 he was appointed bishop of the Foligno. He retired on 10 October 1992.

As a theologian, he championed the work of Henri de Lubac and helped popularize his work in Italy. He also wrote about the works of Angela of Foligno, the 13th-century mystic whom Benedetti lived to see declared a saint by Pope Francis in 2013.

He served for a time as the editor of two newspapers, La Gazzetta di Foligno and La Voce.

As a bishop in the 1970s, he once gave an interview to the Soviet news agency, a departure from Church practice at the time. He held a diocesan synod from 1986 to 1991 to allow the laity to participate in planning and in the implementation of the principles and the Second Vatican Council.

Beginning on 26 May 2016, he was the oldest Italian bishop. He died on 3 August 2017.

Catholic Church titles
Preceded by Maturino Blanchet OMI	Titular Bishop of Limata; 1974–1976	Succeeded by Edward Kisiel
Preceded by Siro Silvestri	Bishop of Foligno; 1976–1992	Succeeded by Arduino Bertoldo
