= Isidoro Chiari =

Italian bishop

Most Reverend Isidoro Chiari
- Bishop of Foligno
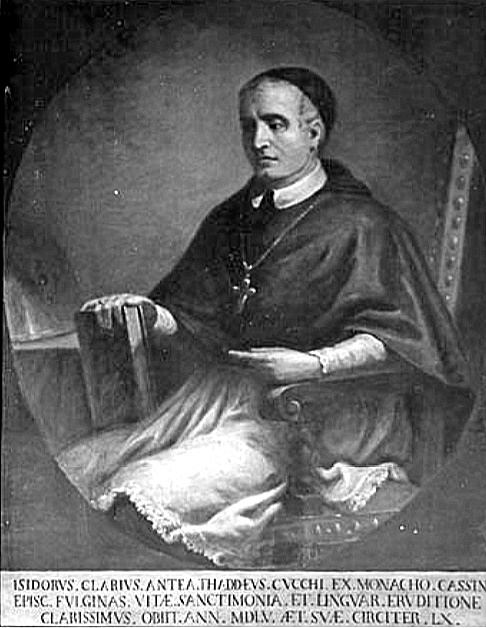
- Giuseppe Teosa (attr.), Ritratto di Isidoro Clario, Chiari, sacrestia della Collegiata
- Church: Catholic Church
- Diocese: Diocese of Foligno
- In office: 1547-1555
- Predecessor: Blosio Palladio
- Successor: Sebastiano Portico
- Previous post: Abbot of S. Maria (Cesena) (1540-1547)

Orders
- Consecration: 17 April 1547 by Giovanni Barba, O.S.A.

Personal details
- Born: Taddeo Cucchi; 1495 Chiari, Lombardy, Italy
- Died: 18 March 1555 (aged 59–60) Foligno, Italy

Isidoro Chiari, or Isidoro Clario or Isidoro da Chiari, also known by his Latin name Isidorus Clarius and sometimes called Brixianus after the land of his birth, was a founding father of the Council of Trent and an editor of an edition of the Vulgate.

== Early life and family ==
He was born Taddeo Cucchi in Chiari, Brescia in 1495, of modest ancestry. He had a brother, Basilio, who died in 1531. His boyhood teacher was Angelo Claretto, who enjoyed some poetical gifts. Around the age of fifteen, he fell in love with a girl, but she died.

== Monk, prior, and abbot ==
He took the name Isidorus Clarius at his profession as a Benedictine on 24 June 1517 at the abbey of Saint John in Parma. He made rapid progress in both sacred and secular literature. During his years in Parma, he appears to have suffered from continual intestinal problems. In 1527, he wrote to his friend Leander at Modena that it felt like the cave of the winds. In the autumn when he was in Brescia, he consulted a physician, who prescribed asses' milk. In 1528 he travelled with some brothers to the monastery of Torchiara (Turres Claras), on orders of Pope Clement VII who had assigned the monastery in Parma to other occupants. But the size of Torchiara was such that it could not hold all the brothers, and therefore, after complaints to Rome, with papal permission they returned to Parma. In 1534 he was at Montecassino, and in c. 1535 he and his mentor (praeceptor) Gregory Cortese were transferred to Rome. Corteste had been appointed to Pope Paul III's Concilium delectorum cardinalium et aliorum praelatorum de emendanda Ecclesia.

Esteemed as well for his purity, charity, and eloquence, he was appointed prior of the monastery of St Peter in Modena in 1537. His mentor, Gregory Cortese, wrote to Cardinal Gasparo Contarini, expressing the hope that Chiari would be consoled by the pleasing conversation. In 1540 he was summoned to Mantua to attend the General Chapter of the Benedictine Order, where he presented a public oration. He was elected abbot of the monastery of Pontida in the diocese of Brescia, then of S. Maria di Cesena. He was still abbot of S. Maria when he appeared at the opening of the Council of Trent.

== Scholar ==
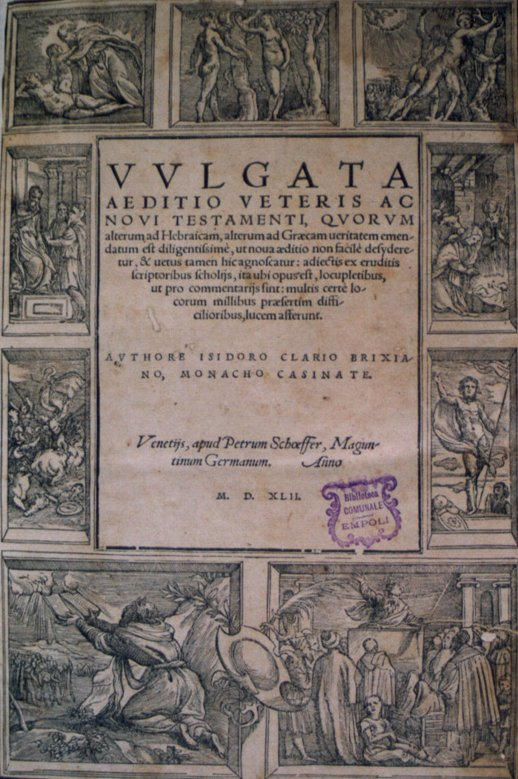
Chiari's edition of the Vulgate (1542)

In 1540 he published his Adhortatio ad Concordiam, already written by 1538 and dedicated to his friend Cardinal Gasparo Contarini. It was a plea to Lutherans and Catholics to focus on common grounds, rather than seek points of difference.

In 1541 he published an edition of the New Testament in Latin which was followed one year later by the whole Vulgate Bible in Venice by Peter Schöffer. (Note: Available digital copy by the Austrian National Library at Google Books here.) Most notable is his revision following the Hebrew text of the Song of Songs with extensive commentary; it became the text for ten motets by Gioseffo Zarlino. His efforts on behalf of the Bible and the Song of Songs were part of a larger spiritual movement among the Cassinese Congregations emphasizing the restoration of the Imago Dei in man as the primary significance of justification.

He was granted the privilege of being a mitred abbot by Pope Paul III

In June 1545, the General Council of the Congregatio Cassinense of the Order of Saint Benedict met in Mantua in anticipation of the opening of the Council of Trent. They elected three of their abbots to represent them at the council, one of whom was Isidore of S. Maria (Cesena). At the opening, the issue was raised as to whether abbots had votes in the council sessions, and it was finally decided on 4 January 1546 that the three Benedictine abbots would share one vote. At the council in February and May of 1546, he successfully argued for an honored place for the Latin Vulgate along with the tradition of the Church.

His own edition of the Vulgate was put on the Index in 1559, and a new edition of it was authorized in 1564, but "deprived of the preface and of the prolegomenas, because those were manifestly sympathizing with the Lutheran heresy"

== Bishop of Foligno ==
Following the council, on 24 January 1547, he was appointed bishop of Foligno on the recommendation of Cardinals Reginald Pole, Giovanni Andrea Cortese, and Jacopo Sadoleto. At the beginning of his tenure, Bishop Isidoro summoned and presided over a diocesan synod, which met on 14 November 1547. He held a second synod on 22 October 1548. A third synod took place on 14 October 1549, and a fourth on 15 October 1550.

In his diocese Bishop Chiari gained a reputation for his instruction of the poor; in 1547 he organized the "Society of Saint Martin", composed of twelve prominent men of the diocese to deal with the shameful condition of the poor. He encouraged the promotion of literature, and especially the Greek language, through an academy which he founded. In 1548 he invited into his diocese the Jesuit Silvestro Landini, who helped organize confraternities for the youth to encourage frequent confession.

In 1551, Bishop Chiari began to preach a series of sermons in the Cathedral on the subject of the Gospel of Saint Luke. His view, expressed in his synods, was that preaching was a prime duty of the clergy, and at the same time he wanted his people to hear the word of God. He therefore preached on a chapter of the Gospel of Luke each week, following successively in order. His series of sermons was interrupted by his death.

He was stricken by a fever, and died on 18 March 1555. His remains were displayed in the cathedral of Foligno, where he was buried in an emotional funeral service.

He and his edition of the Vulgate are mentioned by name in the preface of the King James Bible.

== Bibliography ==
- Formenti, Fausto, ed. (2006). Isidoro Clario: 1495 ca - 1555; umanista teologo tra Erasmo e la Controriforma; un bilancio nel 450o della morte; atti della giornata di studio (Chiari, 22 ottobre 2005) (in Italian). Brescia: Associazione per la Storia della Chiesa Bresciana.
- Giordano, Silvano (2004). "Isidoro da Chiari", in: Dizionario Biografico degli Italiani Volume 62 (Treccani: 2004), pp. 647–650. (in Italian)
- Gussago, Germano Jacopo (1822). Biblioteca clarense ovvero notizie istorico-critiche intorno agli scrittori e letterati di Chiari raccolte e scritte dall'abate . Volume 1. [-3.] (in Italian). Vol. II. Chiari: Gaetano Antonio Tellaroli. pp. 5–95.
- Storia e cultura in Umbria nell'età moderna (Sec. XV-XVIII): Atti del VII Convegno di studi umbri. Gubbio, 18-22 maggio 1969. Centro di studi umbri, Casa di Sant'Ubaldo in Gubbio e Palazzo della Sapienza in Perugia (in Italian). Perugia: A cura della Facoltà di lettere e filosofia dell'Università degli studi, Perugia. 1972.
- Marani, A. (1972). "Il Clario e la residenza dei vescovi," in: Brixia sacra VII (1972), pp. 114–121. (in Italian)
- Ulianich, Boris (1972). "Isidoro Chiari e la sua attività riformatrice nella diocesi di Foligno (1547-1555), in: Storia e cultura in Umbria nell'età moderna. (Sec. XV-XVIII) (in Italian). 1972. pp. 147–265.
