= Messalina (disambiguation) =

Valeria Messalina (c.17/20-48) was a Roman Empress as the third wife of Emperor Claudius.

Messalina can also refer to:

- Statilia Messalina (c. 35-68), Roman Empress as the third wife of Emperor Nero
- Saint Messalina, early Christian martyr (died 250 AD)
- Caroline Stanhope, Countess of Harrington (1722-1784), British socialite nicknamed Stable Yard Messalina
- 545 Messalina, a minor planet orbiting the Sun
- Messalina (1924 film), an Italian film
- Messalina (1930 film), a Brazilian film directed by Luiz de Barros
- Messalina (1951 film), directed by Carmine Gallone
- Messalina (1960 film), an Italian film
- Messalina, Messalina!, a 1977 Italian film directed by Bruno Corbucci
- Messalina (English translation of Messaline, 1901 novel of ancient Rome by Alfred Jarry)
