= Gressan =

Gressan Grésàn (Valdôtain)
- Comune
- Comune di Gressan; Commune de Gressan
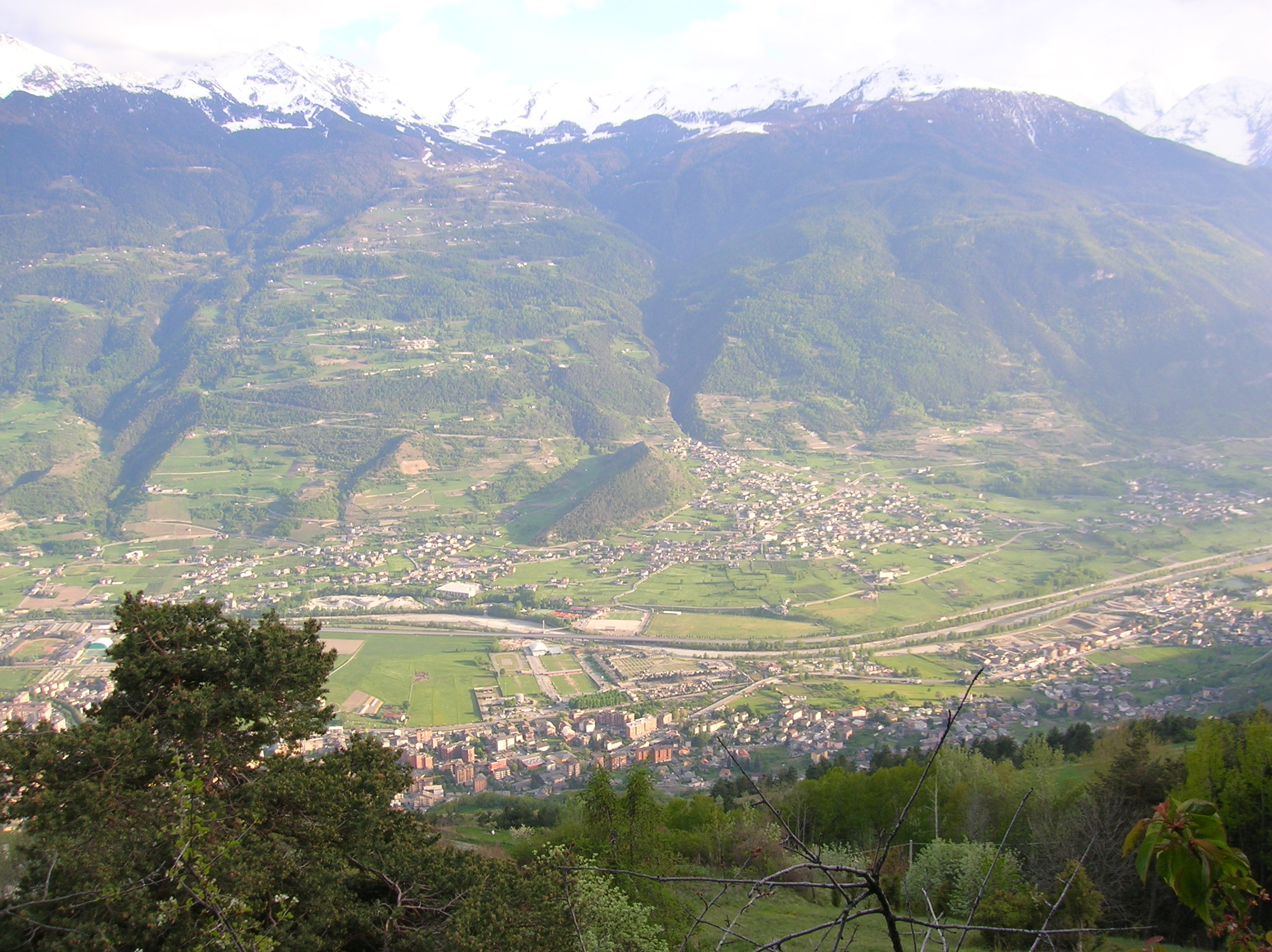

- Coat of arms

- Location within Italy Location within Aosta Valley
- Coordinates: 45°43′N 7°17′E
- Country: Italy
- Region: Aosta Valley
- Province: none
- Frazioni: La Bagne, Barral, Barrier, Bénaz, Bonella, Borettaz, Bovet, La Cerise, Chamen, Champlan, Chanté, Chérémoz, Chez le Rû, Ciel-bleu, Clair, Clérod, La Cort, Crétaz, La Cure de Chevrot, Eaux-froides, Échandail, Étrepiou, Favret, Les Fleurs, La Fontaine, Gerdaz, La Giradaz, Gorret, Grand-Cerise, Impérial, Jacquin, Letey, Leysettaz, La Magdeleine, Moline, Naudin, La Palud, Pâquier, Perriail, Pila, Pilet, La Piscine, Plattaz, Plein Soleil, Rémaz, La Roche, Ronc, Surpillod, Taxel (chef-lieu), Tour de Ville, Vignettaz, Vilvoir, Viseran

Government
  - Mayor: Michel Martinet, from 24 May 2010

Area
  - Total: 25 km^{2} (9.7 sq mi)
- Elevation: 626 m (2,054 ft)

Population (31 December 2022)
  - Total: 3,358
  - Density: 130/km^{2} (350/sq mi)
- Time zone: UTC+1 (CET)
  - Summer (DST): UTC+2 (CEST)
- Postal code: 11020
- Dialing code: 0165
- Patron saint: Saint Stephen
- Website: Official website

Gressan French pronunciation (Valdôtain: Grésàn) is a town and comune in the Aosta Valley region of north-western Italy. Its patron saint is Saint Stephen.

== Notable people ==
- Maturino Blanchet, (1892–1974), bishop of Aosta
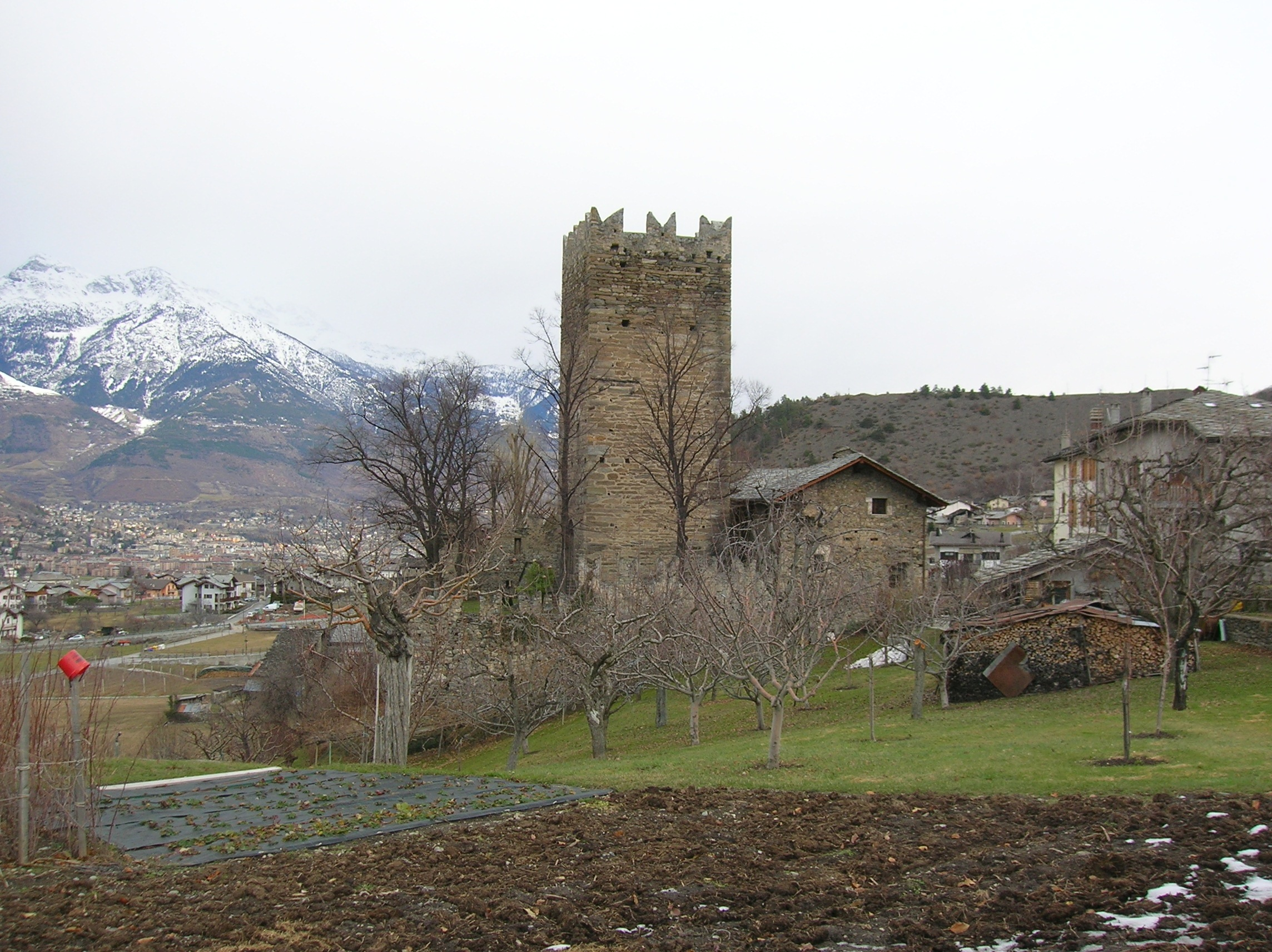
The Tour de Villa castle.

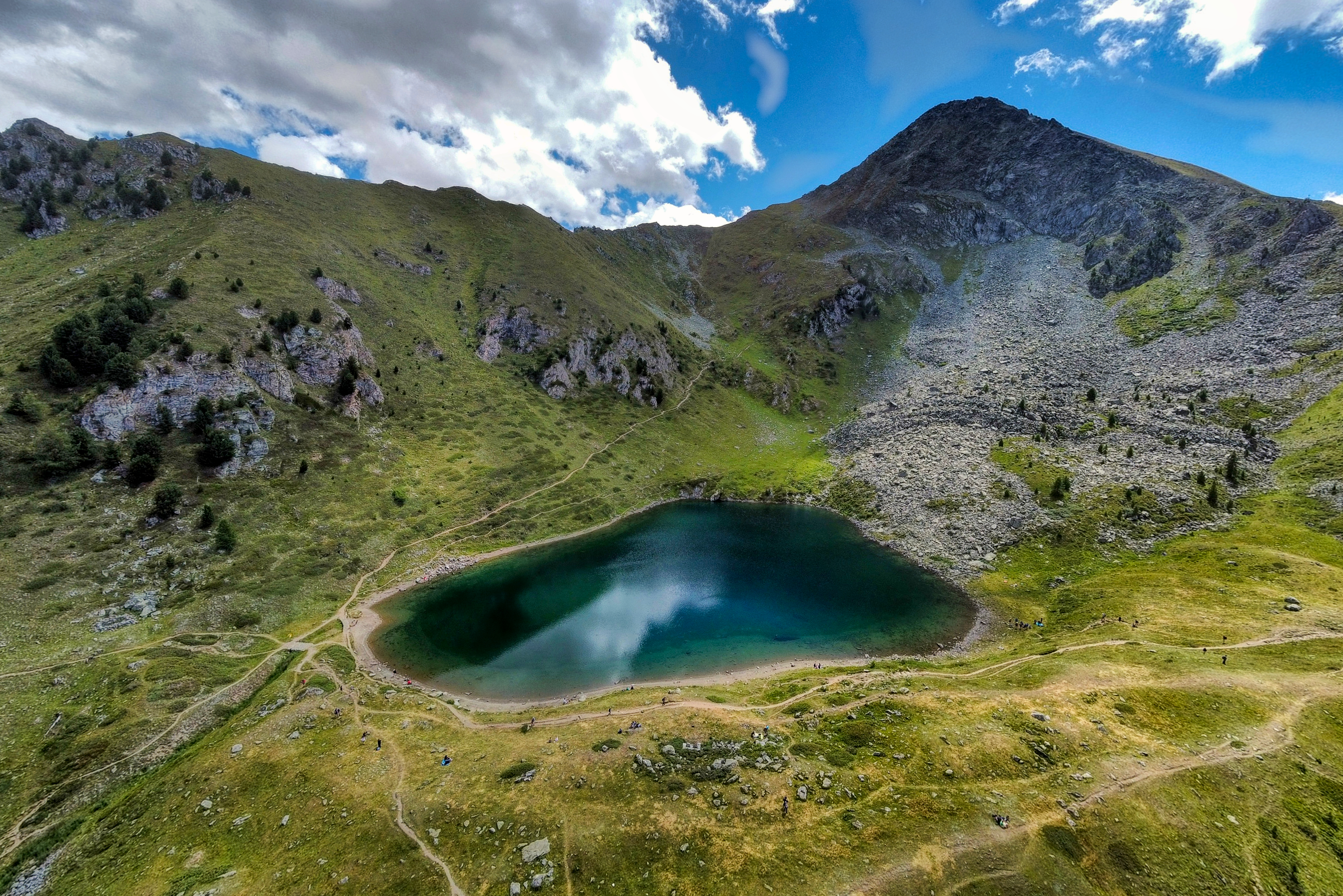
Chamolé lake.
