= Maturino Blanchet =

Maturino Blanchet O.M.I.
- Bishop of Aosta
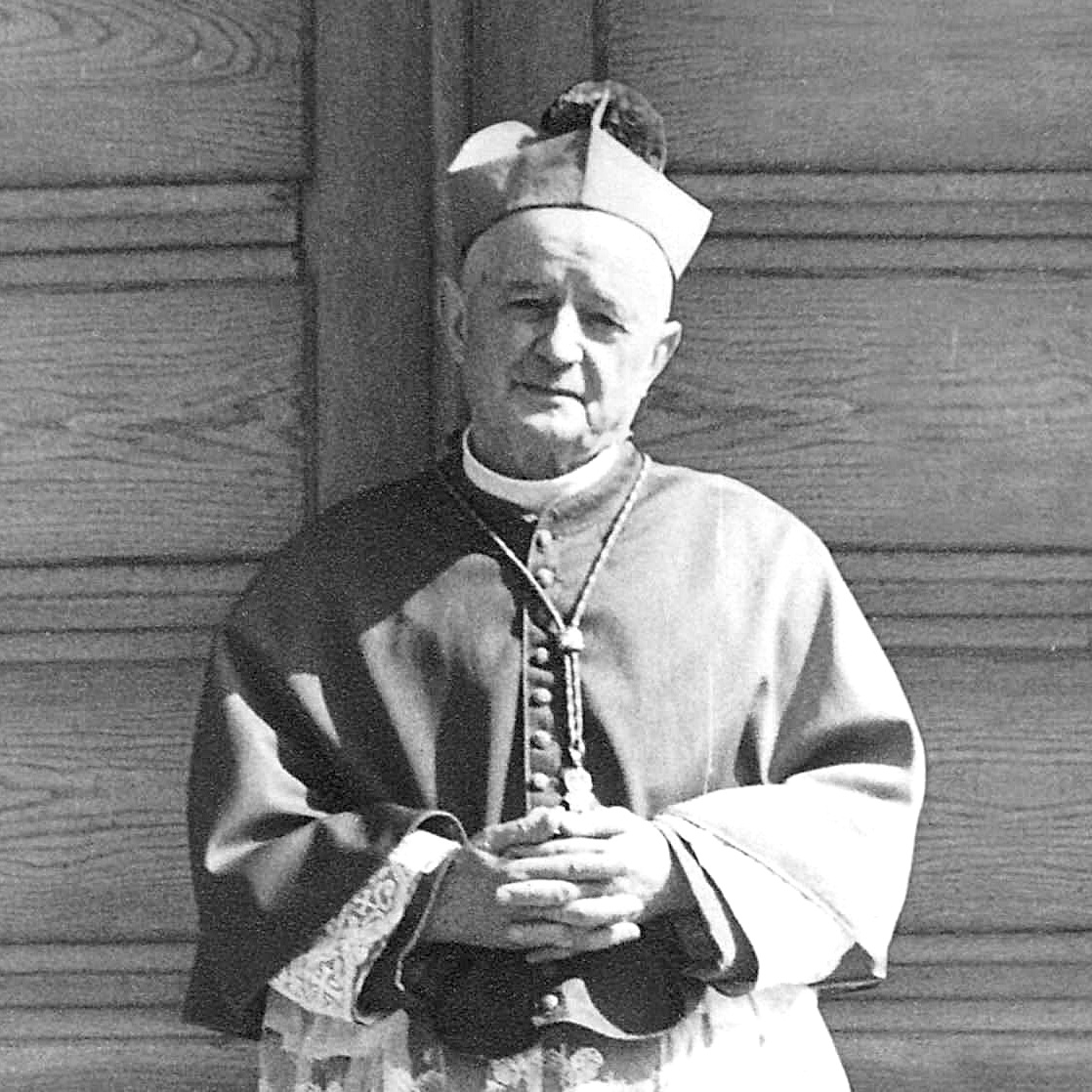
- Church: Roman Catholic Church
- See: Roman Catholic Diocese of Aosta
- In office: 1946–1968
- Predecessor: Francesco Imberti
- Successor: Ovidio Lari

Orders
- Ordination: 29 June 1921
- Consecration: 3 March 1945 by Cardinal Jean-Marie-Rodrigue Villeneuve

Personal details
- Born: 3 March 1892 Gressan, Italy
- Died: 9 November 1974 (aged 82) Saint-Pierre, Italy
- Denomination: Roman Catholic Church
- Occupation: bishop
- Profession: priest

Styles of Maturino Blanchet
- Reference style: His Excellency
- Spoken style: Your Excellency
- Religious style: Bishop

Angelo Maturino Blanchet or Ange-Mathurin Blanchet (3 March 1892 – 9 November 1974) was the Italian Bishop of the Roman Catholic Diocese of Aosta from his appointment by Pope Pius XII on 18 February 1946 until his retirement on 15 October 1968.

== Biography ==
Born in Gressan from Pierre-Aimable and Caroline in 1892, Blanchet had the solemn profession for the Oblates of Mary Immaculate in 1920 and was ordained a Catholic priest on 29 June 1921. He was appointed superior of his Order in Pescara.

He was appointed bishop of Aosta on 18 February 1946. He was council father during the four sessions of the Second Vatican Council.

During his ministry he founded or re-founded seven new parishes, five in Aosta (Saint-Martin-de-Corléans, St. Mary Immaculate, St. Anselm, Signayes and Porossan), Champoluc and Entrèves. He opened three Diocesan Eucharistic congresses and six pastoral visits, ordering seventy-eight priests.

He resigned due to an age limit on 15 October 1968 and was appointed titular bishop of Limata. He died on 9 November 1974 at the Saint-Jacquême priory in Saint-Pierre.

Catholic Church titles
Preceded by Francesco Imberti	Bishop of Aosta; 1946–1968	Succeeded by Ovidio Lari

Catholic Church titles
Preceded by Lorenzo Michele Joseph Graziano O.F.M.	Titular Bishop of Limata; 1968–1974	Succeeded by Giovanni Benedetti
