= Messalina of Foligno =

Catholic saint

Saint Messalina of Foligno
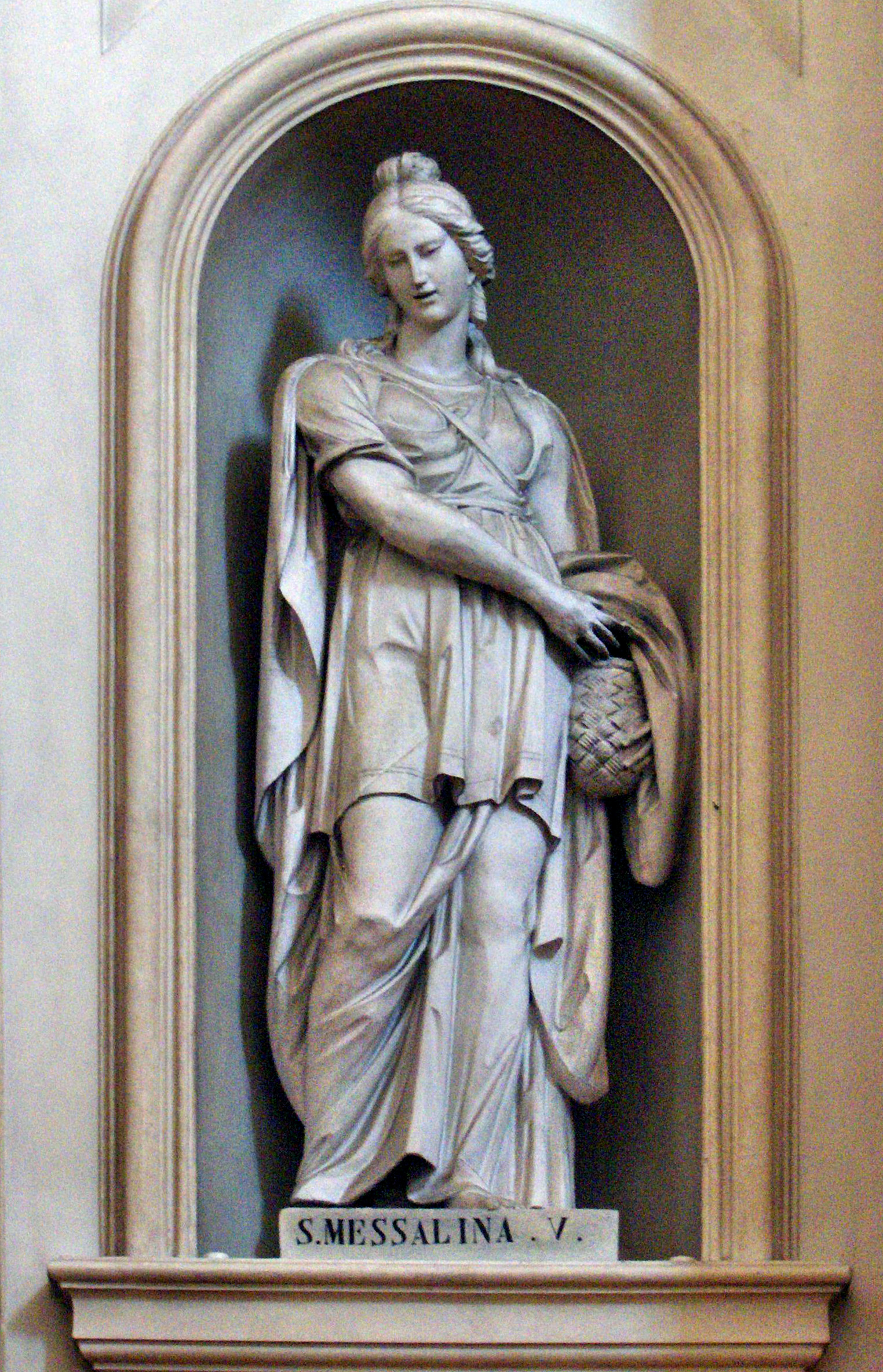
- Status of St. Messalina in Foligno Cathedral

Virgin and martyr
- Born: 235 C.E. Foligno, Roman Italy
- Died: 23 January 249 C.E. Foligno, Roman Italy
- Venerated in: Catholic Church; Eastern Orthodox Church
- Major shrine: Foligno Cathedral
- Feast: 19 January (Eastern Orthodox); 23 January (Catholic)
- Patronage: Foligno

Messalina of Foligno (Italian: Santa Messalina di Foligno; 235–249) was a 3rd-century Italian Christian consecrated virgin and martyr who was a disciple of Felician of Foligno. During the persecution of Christians by Emperor Decius, she was clubbed to death after she refused to make a sacrifice to the Roman gods. She is venerated as a saint in the Catholic Church and Eastern Orthodox Church.

== Biography ==
Messalina was a Christian woman living in Foligno in the third century. She was a disciple of Bishop Felician of Foligno, from whom she received the veil upon taking vows of celibacy and chastity. She visited Felician in prison following his arrest during Emperor Decius's persecution of Christians.

She was denounced as a Christian and, after she refused to make a sacrifice to the Roman gods, she was beaten to death on 23 January 249.

Messalina is venerated as a saint in the Catholic Church and Eastern Orthodox Church. Her major shrine is at Foligno Cathedral.
