= Diocese of Foligno =

Roman Catholic diocese in Italy

Coordinates: 42.9500°N 12.7000°E

Diocese of Foligno Dioecesis Fulginatensis

Catholic
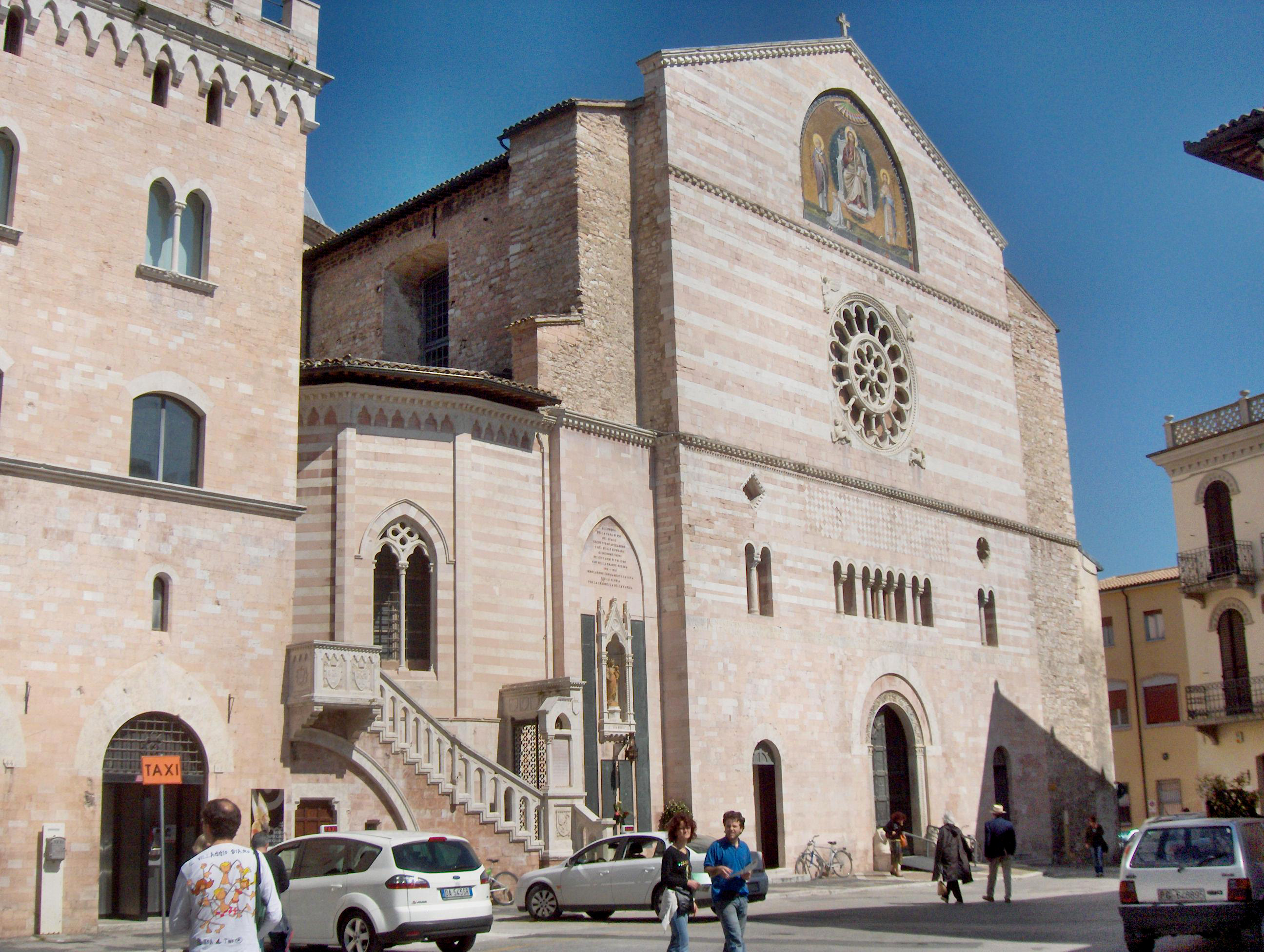
- Foligno Cathedral

Location
- Country: Italy
- Ecclesiastical province: Perugia-Città della Pieve

Statistics
- Area: 350 km^{2} (140 sq mi)
- Parishes: 39

Information
- Denomination: Catholic Church
- Sui iuris church: Latin Church
- Rite: Roman Rite
- Established: 1st century
- Cathedral: Cattedrale di S. Feliciano V.M.
- Secular priests: 32 (diocesan); 31 (Religious Orders); 15 Permanent Deacons

Current leadership
- Pope: Leo XIV
- Bishop (personal title): Domenico Sorrentino

Website
- Diocesi di Foligno (in Italian)

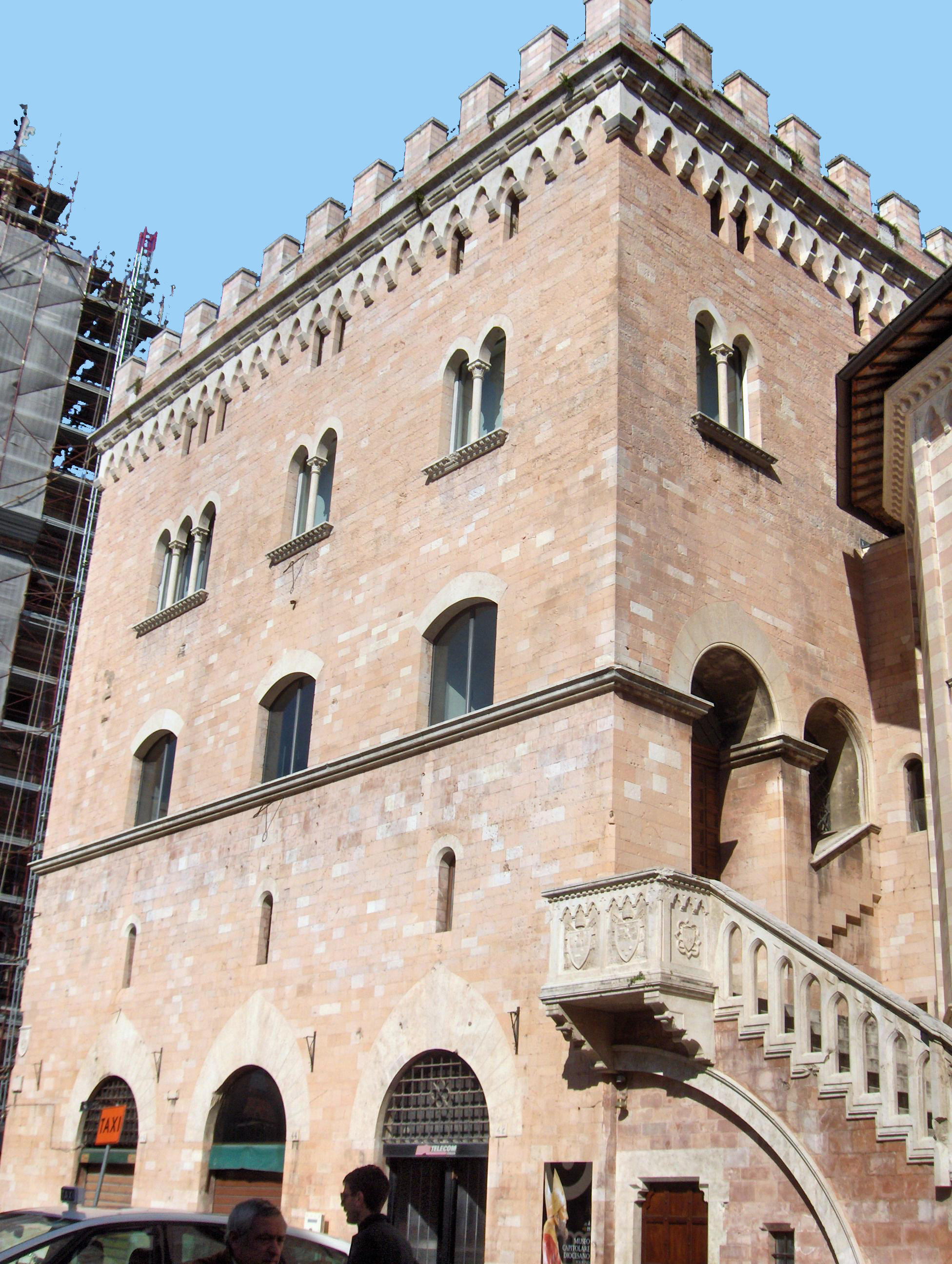
Canonica (Foligno), residence of the Canons

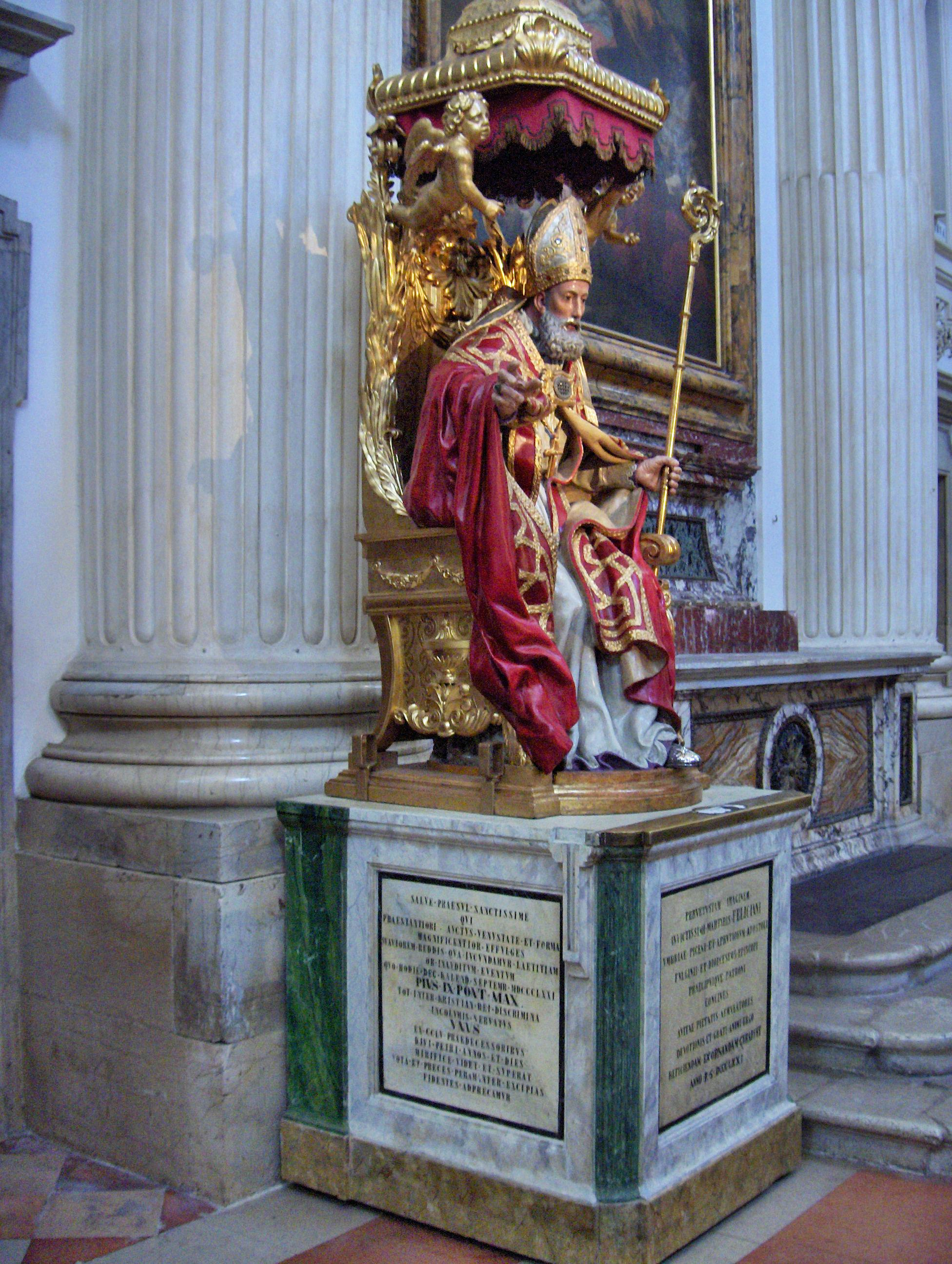
Statue of Felician, bishop of Foligno, enthroned

The Diocese of Foligno (Latin: Dioecesis Fulginatensis) is a Latin Church ecclesiastical territory or diocese of the Catholic Church in Umbria, Italy. It is a suffragan diocese in the ecclesiastical province of the metropolitan Archdiocese of Perugia-Città della Pieve.

== History ==
Tradition has it that Christianity was introduced at Foligno in the first half of the second century. Felicianus, the patron saint of the city, though certainly not the first bishop, was consecrated by Pope Victor I and martyred under Decius (24 January); the exact dates of his history are uncertain.

Until 471 no other bishop is known. Vincent of Laodicea in Syria was made bishop by Pope Hormisdas in 523.

In 740 the episcopal city of Forflamme was destroyed by the angry Lombard King Liutprand. It was not revived, and it is believed that the responsibility for the inhabitants passed to Foligno.

In February 1145, Pope Lucius II died of a wound received in street fighting in Rome, and his hastily elected successor Pope Eugene III was immediately driven out of the city and replaced with a republic. He settled in exile in Viterbo. On 10 March 1146, Cardinal Giulio Romano of S. Marcello, Legate of Eugenius III convoked a council in Foligno. The council was attended by the bishops of Narni, Amelia, Spoleto, Todi, Assisi, Perugia, Cagli, Gubbio, Urbino, Montefeltro, Rimini, Pesaro, Fossombrone, Senigallia, Ancona, Umana, Fermo, Ascoli, Escolano, Jesi, Osimo, Camerino, Nocera, and Bishop Benedetto of Foligno. Also present were numerous Provosts, Archdeacons, Archpriests, Abbots and Priors. On 10 March 1146, the assembled clergy participated in the consecration of the cathedral of Foligno, dedicated to S. John the Baptist, S. Feliciano, and S. Fiorenzio.

=== Cathedral, churches, and monasteries ===
Foligno Cathedral, of very early date, and possessing a beautiful crypt, was rebuilt beginning in 1133; in 1201 a wing, with a façade, was added, famous for its sculptures by Binello and Rodolfo (statues of Frederick Barbarossa and of Bishop Anselm), restored in 1903. No Provost or Canon of the cathedral Chapter could be installed without the consent of the bishop. The privileges of the Canons of the cathedral Chapter were confirmed by Pope Innocent II in 1138. The Canonica, residence of the Canons, already existed in 1078, when Bishop Bonfilius made extensive grants of property to the Prior and Canons, especially half of the cloister of the cathedral and two gardens.

In 1684, the cathedral was administered and served by a Chapter consisting of three dignities and sixteen Canons. The dignities were: the Prior, the Dean, and the Archpriest. In 1777, there were still three dignities, but only twelve Canons.

Other churches are: Santa Maria infra Portas, of the Lombard period, with Byzantine frescoes; San Claudio (1232); San Domenico (1251); San Giovanni Profiamma (1231), whose name recalls the ancient city of Forum Flaminii.

The Monastery of Sassovivo, founded c. 1080, eventually held control over 92 other monasteries and 41 churches, including the Church of Ss. Quatuor Coronatorum and the Church of Ss. Sergius and Bacchus in Rome. It had a remarkable cloister of 120 columns.

=== Synods ===
A diocesan synod was an irregularly held, but important, meeting of the bishop of a diocese and his clergy. Its purpose was (1) to proclaim generally the various decrees already issued by the bishop; (2) to discuss and ratify measures on which the bishop chose to consult with his clergy; (3) to publish statutes and decrees of the diocesan synod, of the provincial synod, and of the Holy See.

Among the notable bishops of Foligno was Isidoro Chiari (1547–1555), a Benedictine biblical scholar and theologian, who participated in the early sessions of Council of Trent (1545–1547). He did not attend the later sessions that resumed in 1551, but he submitted a memorandum urging the necessity of bishops being resident in their dioceses. At the beginning of his tenure, Bishop Isidoro Chiari summoned and presided over a diocesan synod, which met on 14 November 1547. He held a second synod on 22 October 1548. A third synod took place on 14 October 1549, and a fourth on 15 October 1550.

Bishop Tommaso Orsini (1568–1576) held a diocesan synod in Foligno on 17 January 1571, and had its constitutions published.

Bishop Giulio Troili (1698–1712) held a diocesan synod on 21–22 May 1703. A diocesan synod was held by Bishop Giosafatte Battistelli (1717–1735) on 21 June 1722.

=== Suffragan ===
The diocese of Foligno had always been directly subject (a suffragan) of the Holy See (the Pope). In accordance with the decree Christus Dominus, chapter 40, of the Second Vatican Council, on 15 August 1972 Pope Paul VI issued the decree Animorum utilitate, in which he changed the status of the diocese of Perugia, from being directly dependent upon the Holy See to being a Metropolitan archdiocese. The ecclesiastical province of Perugia was to contain as suffragans the dioceses of Assisi, Citta di Castello, Citta della Pieve, Foligno, Nocera and Tadinum, and Gubbio. The diocese of Foligno ceased to be directly dependent upon the Holy See.

== Bishops of Foligno ==
=== to 1200 ===
Crispoldus of Jerusalem
Brictius (San Brizio) (also bishop of Spoleto and Foligno)
Felicianus (193–249)

[Felicianus II (303)]
[Paul (Paolo) (350)]

- Urbanus (475–498)
- Fortunatus (attested 499, 501, 502)
- Vincentius (523–551)

[Candidus of Foligno (590–602)]
...
Jacobus (Giacomo) (602–642)
...

- Florus (676–700)

...

- Eusebius (740–760)

...

- Dorotheus (attested 830)
- Dominicus (attested 850, 853)
- Argisius (attested 861)
- Onuphrius (attested 870)

...

- Benedictus (attested 967, 968)

...

- Longinus (Longino) (995–1024)
- Berardus (Berardo) (attested 1024, 1029)
- Henricus (Enrico) (attested 1031)
- Sigemannus (Sigemanno) (attested 1047)
- Azzo degli Atti (1049–1059)
- Bonfilius (attested 1072, 1078–1094)
- Andreas (1099– attested 1120)
- Marcus (attested 1123)
- Benedictus (attested 1138, 1145)
- Anselmo degli Atti (1155–1201)

=== from 1200 to 1500 ===
Sede vacante (1201–1208)
[Gerardo da Sora (1201–1208)]

- Egidio degli Atti (1208–1243)

Diocese suppressed (1243–1265)

Bernardo Merganti (1243–1264) Administrator

Diocese restored (31 March 1265)

- Paperone de' Papareschi (1265–1285)
- Berardo de Comitibus (1285–1296)

[Giacomo degli Anastasi (1296)]

- Bartolomeo Caetani (1296–1304)
- Ermanno degli Anastasi (1304–1307) Bishop-elect
- Bartolòmino Giuntoncini Sigisbuldi (1307–1326)
- Paolo Trinci (1326–1363)
- Rinaldo Trinci (1363)
- Giovanni Angeletti (1364–1397)
- Onofrio Trinci (1397–1403)
- Federico Frezzi (1403–1416) (Roman Obedience)
- Niccolò Ferragatti (1417–1421)

[Gaspare (1421)] Bishop-elect

- Giacomo Berti (1423–1437)

[Rinaldo (II) Trinci (1437–1439)]

- Cristoforo Corsini Boscari (Berti) (1437–1444)
- Antonio Bolognini (1444–1461)

Bartolomeo Tonti (1461) Apostolic Administrator

- Antonio Bettini (1461–1487)
- Francesco Rosa (22 November 1486 – 3 March 1489)
- Luca Borsciani Cybo (1489–1522)

=== from 1500 to 1800 ===
- Cardinal Bernardino Carvajal (1522–1523) Administrator
- Rodrigo Carvajal (4 February 1523 – 1539)
- Fabio Vigili (9 September 1539 –1540)
- Blosio Palladio (4 November 1540 – 27 January 1547)
- Isidoro Chiari da Brescia (28 January 1547 – 18 March 1555)

[Ercole Tambusio (March 1555 – September 1555) Bishop-elect]

- Sebastiano Portico (18 September 1555 – 27 February 1556)
- Giovanni Angelo Medici (1556–1557)
- Giovanni Antonio Serbelloni (7 May 1557 – 13 March 1560 named bishop of Novara
- Clemente d'Olera (13 March 1560 – 6 January 1568)
- Tommaso Orsini (1568–1576)
- Ippolito Bosco (1576–1582)
- Troilo Boncompagni (1582–1584)
- Constantinus Barzellini (1584–1585)
- Marcantonio Bizzoni (1586–1606)
- Francesco Simonetta (1606–1612)
- Porfirio Feliciani (2 April 1612 – 2 October 1634)
- Cristoforo Caetani (1634–1642)
- Antonio Montecatini (December 1642 – 7 January 1668)
- Marcantonio Vicentini (1 April 1669 – 1683)
- Giovanni Battista Pallotta (24 April 1684 – 17 January 1698)
- Giulio Troili (15 September 1698 – 6 July 1712)
- Dondazio Alessio Malvicini Fontana (1712–1717)
- Giosafatte Battistelli (11 May 1717 – 21 March 1735)
- Francesco Maria Alberici (1735–1741)
- Mario Antonio Maffei (1741–1777)
- Giuseppe Maria Morotti, (1777) Bishop-elect
- Gaetano Giannini, (15 December 1777 – 28 March 1785)
- Filippo Trenta (3 April 1785 – 4 March 1796)

=== since 1800 ===
- Marco Antonio Moscardini (1796–1818)
- Stanislao Lucchesi (October 1818 – 2 November 1830)
- Ignazio Giovanni Cadolini (1831–1832)
- Arcangelo Polidori (8 October 1834 – 6 May 1843)
- Nicola Belletti (19 June 1843 – 1864)
- Nicola Crispigni (or Grispigni) (27 March 1867 – 1879)
- Vincenzo Serarcangeli (19 September 1879 – 1888)
- Federico Federici (1888–1892)
- Albino Angelo Pardini, C.R.L. (16 January 1893 – 22 December 1894)
- Carlo Bertuzzi (18 March 1895 – 10 May 1910)
- Giorgio Gusmini (15 April 1910 –1914)
- Carlo Sica (22 January 1915 – 20 December 1917)
- Stefano Corbini (18 June 1918 – 1 October 1946)
- Secondo Chiocca (18 January 1947 – 15 April 1955)
- Siro Silvestri (21 July 1955 –1975)
- Giovanni Benedetti (25 March 1976 – 10 October 1992)
- Arduino Bertoldo (10 October 1992 – 3 July 2008)
- Gualtiero Sigismondi (3 July 2008 – 7 March 2020)
- Domenico Sorrentino (26 June 2021 – 10 January 2026)
- Felice Accrocca (10 January 2026 – present) Archbishop ad personam

== Books ==
=== Reference works for bishops ===
- Gams, Pius Bonifatius (1873). Series episcoporum Ecclesiae catholicae: quotquot innotuerunt a beato Petro apostolo (in Latin). Ratisbon: Typis et Sumptibus Georgii Josephi Manz. pp. 695–697.
- Eubel, Conradus, ed. (1913). Hierarchia catholica (in Latin). Vol. Tomus 1 (second ed.). Münster: Libreria Regensbergiana. (in Latin)
- Eubel, Conradus, ed. (1914). Hierarchia catholica (in Latin). Vol. Tomus 2 (second ed.). Münster: Libreria Regensbergiana.
- Gulik, Guilelmus (1923). Eubel, Conradus (ed.). Hierarchia catholica (in Latin). Vol. Tomus 3 (second ed.). Münster: Libreria Regensbergiana.
- Gauchat, Patritius (Patrice) (1935). Hierarchia catholica. Vol. Tomus IV (1592-1667). Münster: Libraria Regensbergiana.
- Ritzler, Remigius; Sefrin, Pirminus (1952). Hierarchia catholica medii et recentis aevi. Vol. Tomus V (1667-1730). Patavii: Messagero di S. Antonio.
- Ritzler, Remigius; Sefrin, Pirminus (1958). Hierarchia catholica medii et recentis aevi. Vol. Tomus VI (1730-1799). Patavii: Messagero di S. Antonio.
- Ritzler, Remigius; Sefrin, Pirminus (1968). Hierarchia Catholica medii et recentioris aevi (in Latin). Vol. VII (1800–1846). Monasterii: Libreria Regensburgiana.
- Remigius Ritzler; Pirminus Sefrin (1978). Hierarchia catholica Medii et recentioris aevi (in Latin). Vol. VIII (1846–1903). Il Messaggero di S. Antonio.
- Pięta, Zenon (2002). Hierarchia catholica medii et recentioris aevi (in Latin). Vol. IX (1903–1922). Padua: Messagero di San Antonio. ISBN 978-88-250-1000-8.

=== Studies ===
- Bragazzi, Giuseppe (1864). La rosa dell'Umbria, ossia Piccola guida storico-artistica di Foligno e città-contermine Spello, Asisi, Nocera, Trevi, Montefalco, Bevagna (in Italian). Foligno: Campitelli. [presents the traditional hagiography]
- Cappelletti, Giuseppe (1846). Le chiese d'Italia: dalla loro origine sino ai nostri giorni (in Italian). Vol. quatro. Venezia: G. Antonelli. pp. 397–439.
- Faloci-Pulignani, Michele (1904). XVII centenario di S. Feliciano: vescovo di Foligno, 1903-1904 (in Italian). Foligno: F. Salvati. [information on the cathedral, etc.]
- Jacobilli, Lodovico (1646). Discorso della città di Foligno (in Italian). Foligno: Agostino Alterii. [catalog of bishops, pp. 31–39]
- Kehr, Paul Fridolin (1909). Italia pontificia Vol. IV (Berlin: Weidmann 1909), pp. 43–50. (in Latin)
- Lanzoni, Francesco (1927). Le diocesi d'Italia dalle origini al principio del secolo VII (an. 604). Faenza: F. Lega, pp. 446–451. (in Italian)
- Schwartz, Gerhard (1907). Die Besetzung der Bistümer Reichsitaliens unter den sächsischen und salischen Kaisern: mit den Listen der Bischöfe, 951-1122. Leipzig: B.G. Teubner. pp. 236–238. (in German)
- Ughelli, Ferdinando; Coleti, Niccolo (1717). Italia sacra sive de Episcopis Italiae, et insularum adjacentium, rebusque ab iis praeclare gestis ... opus singulare, provinciis XX distinctum ... auctore D.F. Ughello (in Latin). Vol. Tomus primus. Venice: Apud Sebastianum Coleti. pp. 680–718.

==== Acknowledgment ====
- U. Benigni, "Foligno", in: The Catholic Encyclopedia. Vol. VI. New York: Universal Knowledge Foundation. 1913. pp. 124–125.
