= Arduino Bertoldo =

- Bishop of the Diocese of Foligno
- Church: Roman Catholic Church
- See: Diocese of Foligno
- In office: 1992 -2008
- Predecessor: Giovanni Benedetti
- Successor: Gualtiero Sigismondi

Orders
- Ordination: 22 March 1958
- Consecration: 21 November 1992

Personal details
- Born: 30 December 1932; Isola Vicentina, Kingdom of Italy
- Died: 3 April 2012 (aged 79); Vicenza, Italy

Styles of Arduino Bertoldo
- Reference style: His Excellency
- Spoken style: Your Excellency
- Religious style: Bishop

Arduino Bertoldo (December 30, 1932 – April 3, 2012) was the Roman Catholic bishop of the Roman Catholic Diocese of Foligno, Italy.

Ordained to the priesthood in 1958, Bertoldo became bishop in 1992 and retired in 2008.

== Notes ==
- Cheney, David M. "Diocese of Foligno". Catholic-Hierarchy.org. (for Chronology of Bishops)^{self-published}
- Chow, Gabriel. "Diocese of Foligno". GCatholic.org. (for Chronology of Bishops)^{self-published}

Catholic Church titles
Preceded by Giovanni Benedetti	Bishop of Foligno; 1976–1992	Succeeded by Gualtiero Sigismondi
