= Carlo Colombo =

Italian sports shooter

Personal information
- Nationality: Italian
- Born: 28 April 1960 (age 64); Milan, Italy

Sport
- Sport: Sports shooting

Carlo Colombo (born 28 April 1960) is an Italian sports shooter. He competed at the 1992 Summer Olympics and the 1996 Summer Olympics.
