= Pila, Aosta Valley =

Alpine ski-resort in the Aosta Valley, Italy

Coordinates: 45°43′07″N 7°17′18″E

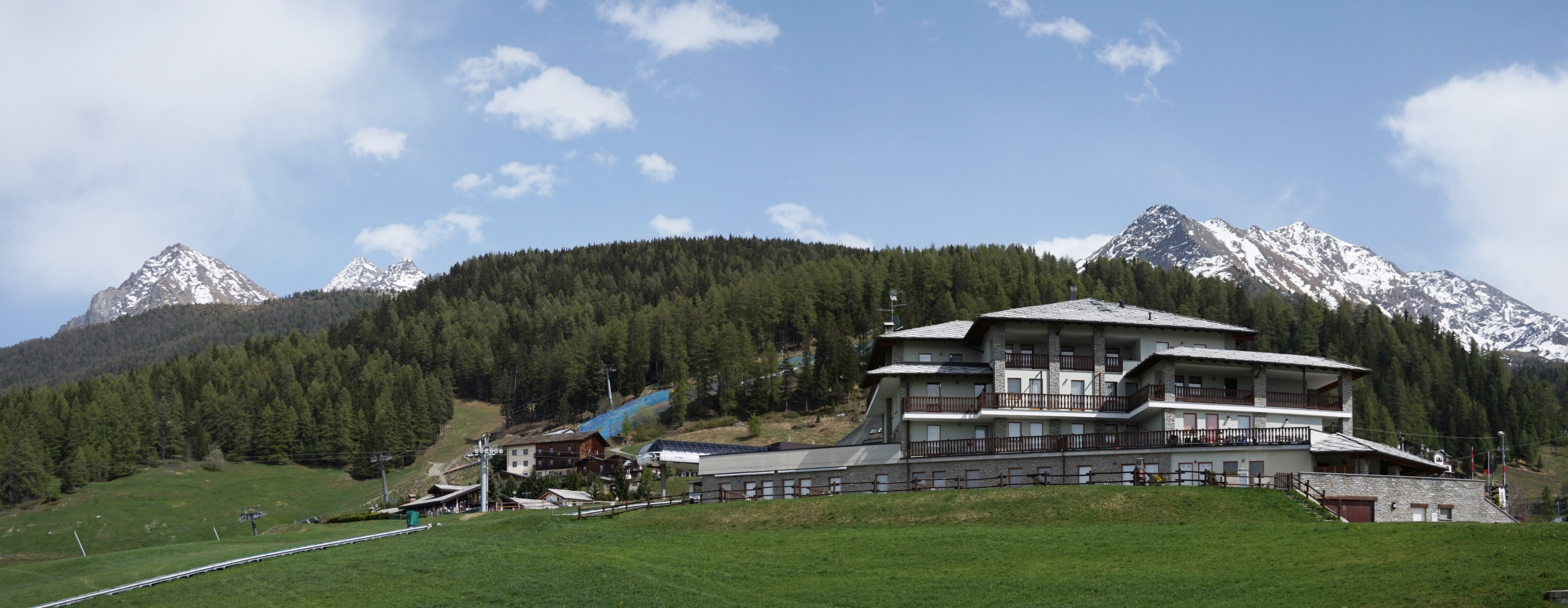
Pila

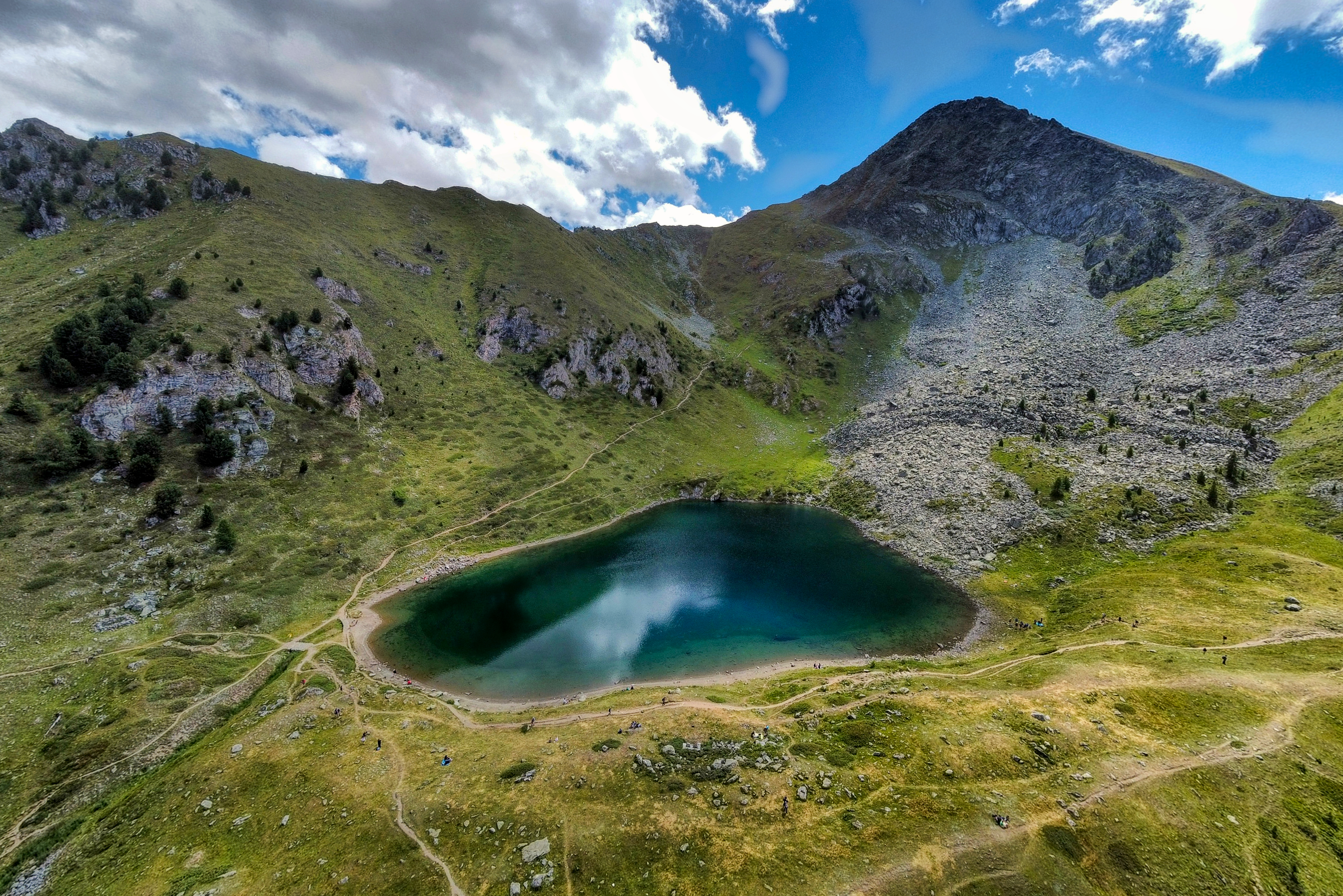
Chamolé lake

Pila is an Alpine ski-resort in the Aosta Valley region of northern Italy. It is a frazione of the comune of Gressan.

There are more than 24 pistes (>70 km total length), including 4 blue runs, 29 red runs and 4 black runs, with a pipe zone and a slopestyle zone. There is one cable car, 2 gondolas, 8 chairlifts and 5 conveyors. The resort itself is at 1,814 metres altitude, while the highest skiing can be done at 2,700m.

The nearest city to Pila is Aosta, to which it is connected by road and also a cable car system.

It is the site of one of Laurent Chappis's works.
