= Felician of Foligno =

Italian saint

Saint Felician of Foligno
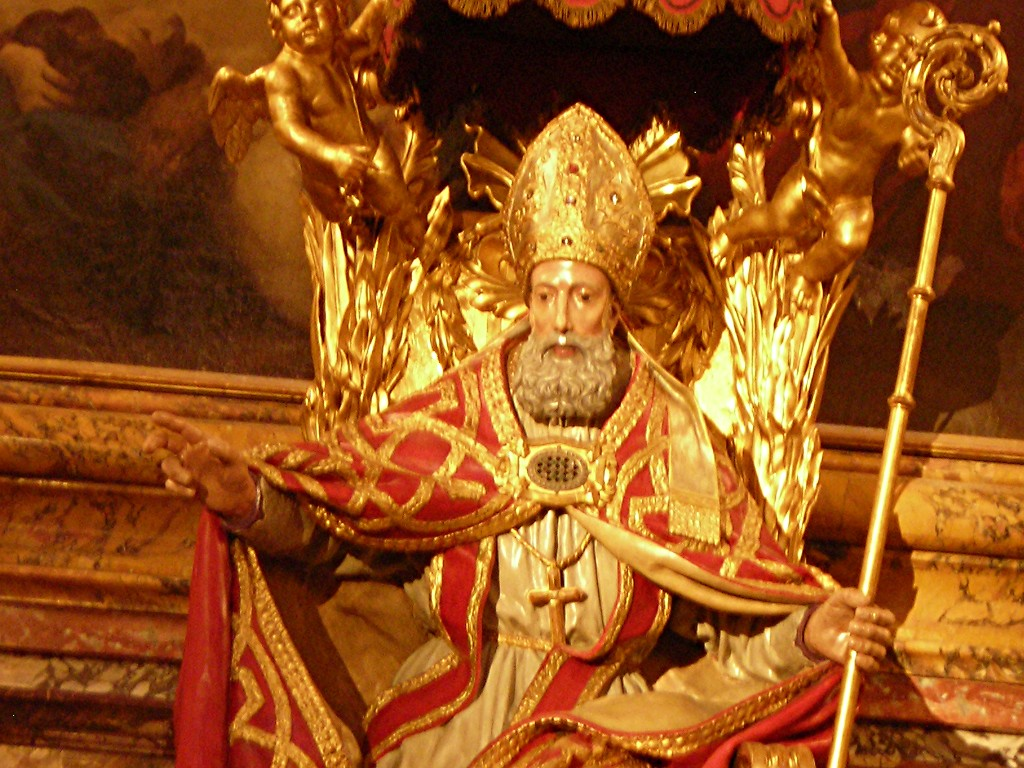
- Statue of San Feliciano di Foligno in Foligno

Bishop and martyr
- Born: 160; Forum Flaminii
- Died: 250; Foligno
- Venerated in: Roman Catholic Church; Eastern Orthodox Church
- Major shrine: Foligno Cathedral
- Feast: 24 January; formerly 20 October
- Attributes: old bishop with holes bored through his feet and hands
- Patronage: Foligno

Felicianus of Foligno (Italian: San Feliciano di Foligno) (c. 160 – c. 250) is the patron saint of Foligno.

== Biography ==
According to Christian tradition, he was born in Forum Flaminii (present-day San Giovanni Profiamma), on the Via Flaminia, of a Christian family, around 160. He was the spiritual student of Pope Eleuterus and evangelized in Foligno, Spello, Bevagna, Assisi, Perugia, Norcia, Plestia, Trevi, and Spoleto.

He was later consecrated bishop of Foligno by Pope Victor I around 204 (he was the first bishop to receive the pallium as a symbol of his office). He ordained Valentine of Terni as a priest. His episcopate lasted for more than 50 years; he was one of the first Christian bishops of northern Italy. He was arrested at the age of 94 for refusing to sacrifice to the Roman gods during the persecutions of Decius. During his imprisonment, one of his disciples, Messalina of Foligno, visited him. He was tortured and scourged, and died outside Foligno while being conveyed to Rome for his execution.

== Veneration ==
A church was built over his grave at Foligno. His relics were transferred to Metz on October 4, 970. In 965 some relics were translated to Minden in Germany; Felician was thus erroneously considered a bishop of that German city (and he had a separate feast day of October 20), an error that entered the Roman Martyrology. Some of his relics were later returned to Foligno in 1673–4.

Foligno Cathedral preserves a statue of the saint, of silver and bronze, made by the sculptor Giovanni Battista Maini.

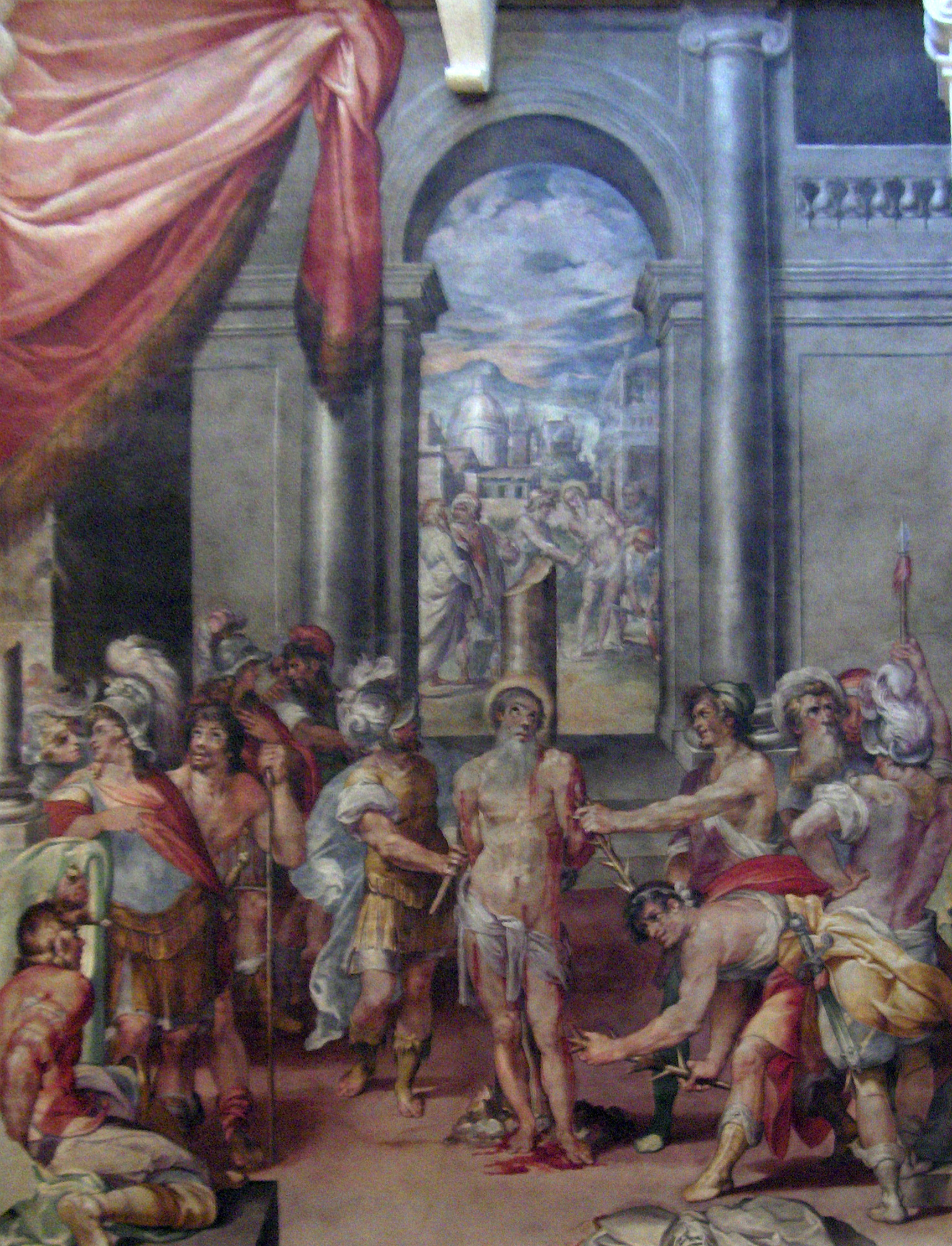
Scene from the Life of St. Felician

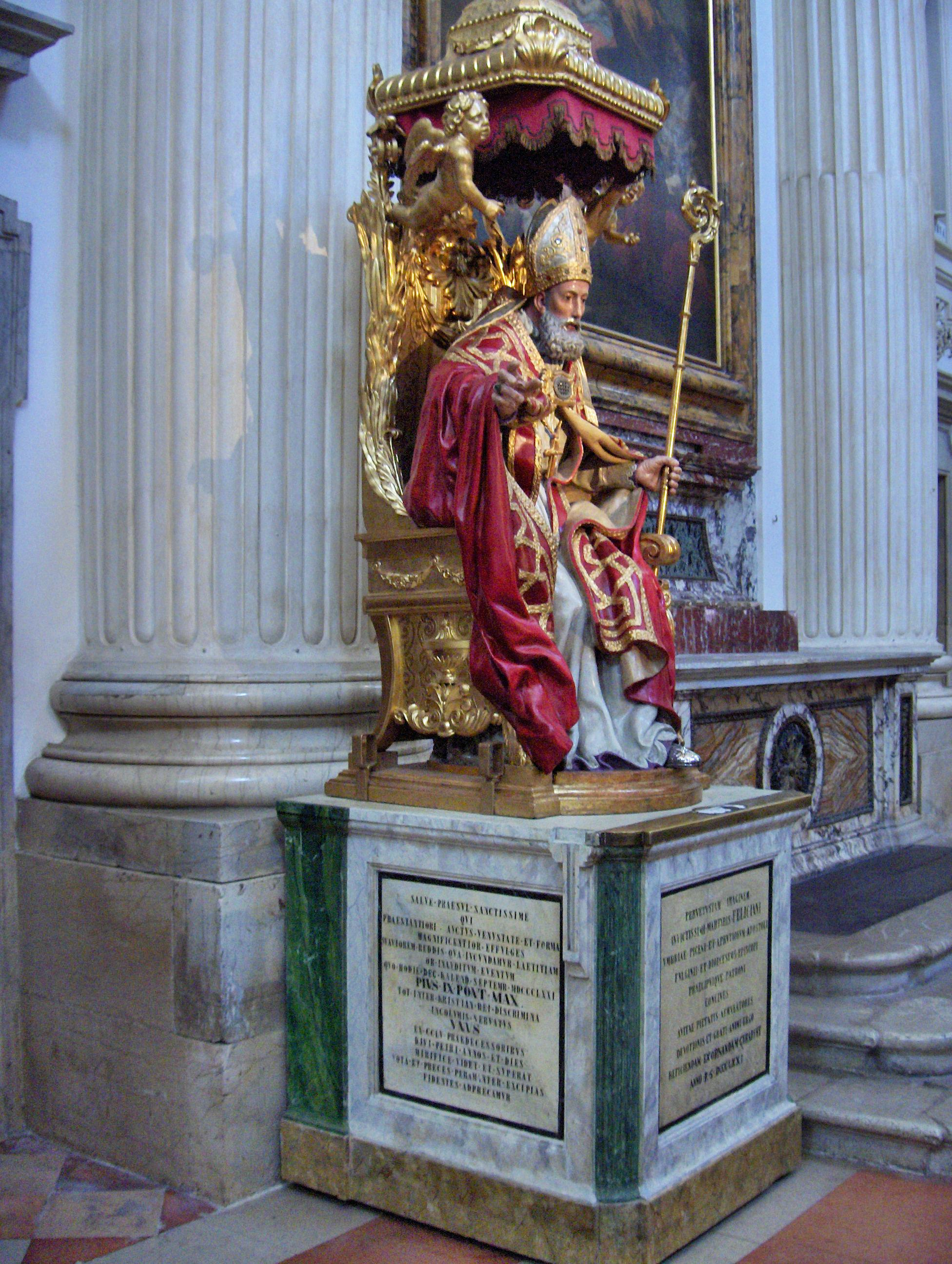
Statue of Felician enthroned

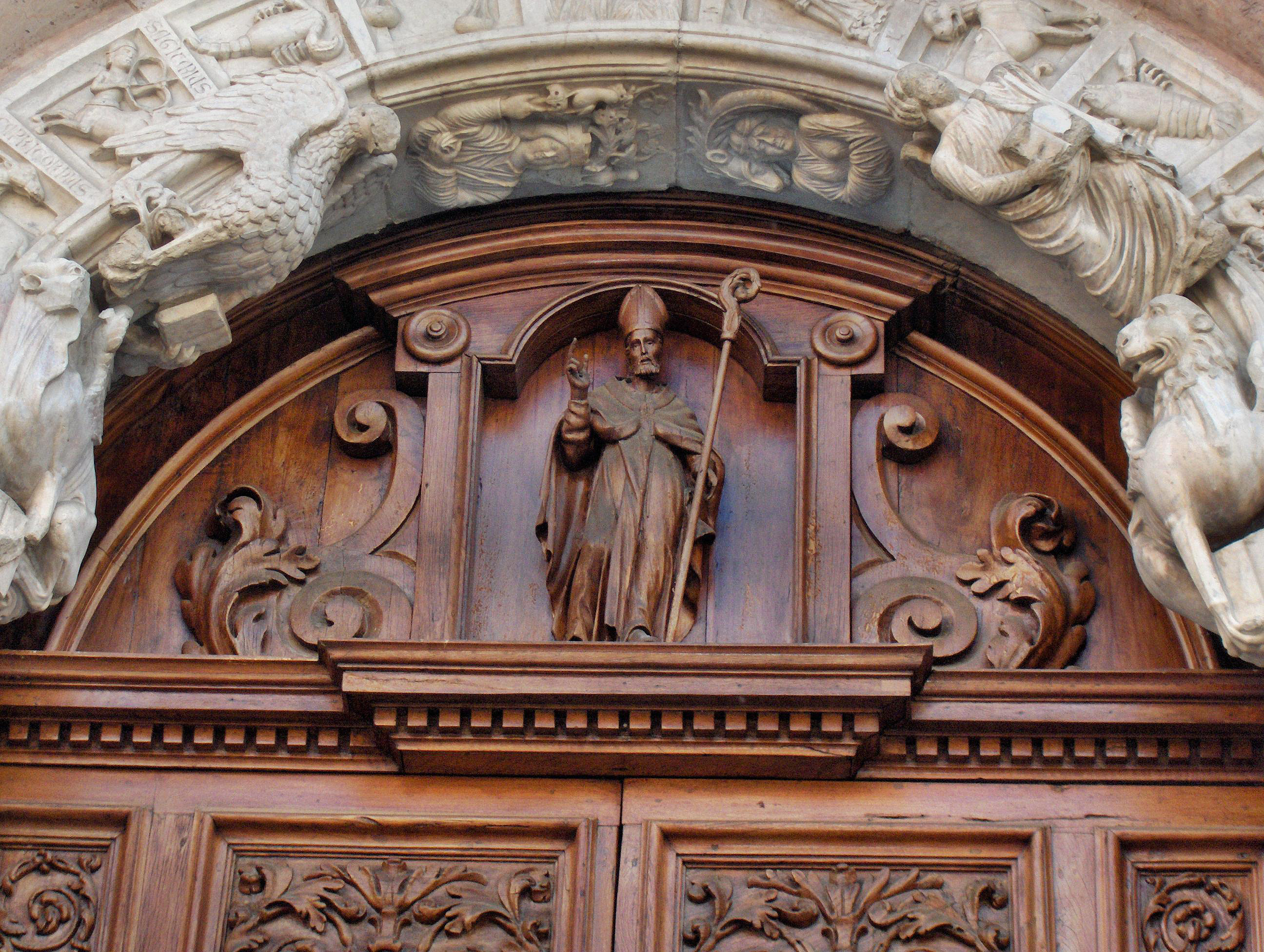
Depiction of Felician. Cathedral of Foligno.
