= Foligno Cathedral =

Church building in Foligno, Italy

Coordinates: 42°57′23″N 12°42′12″E

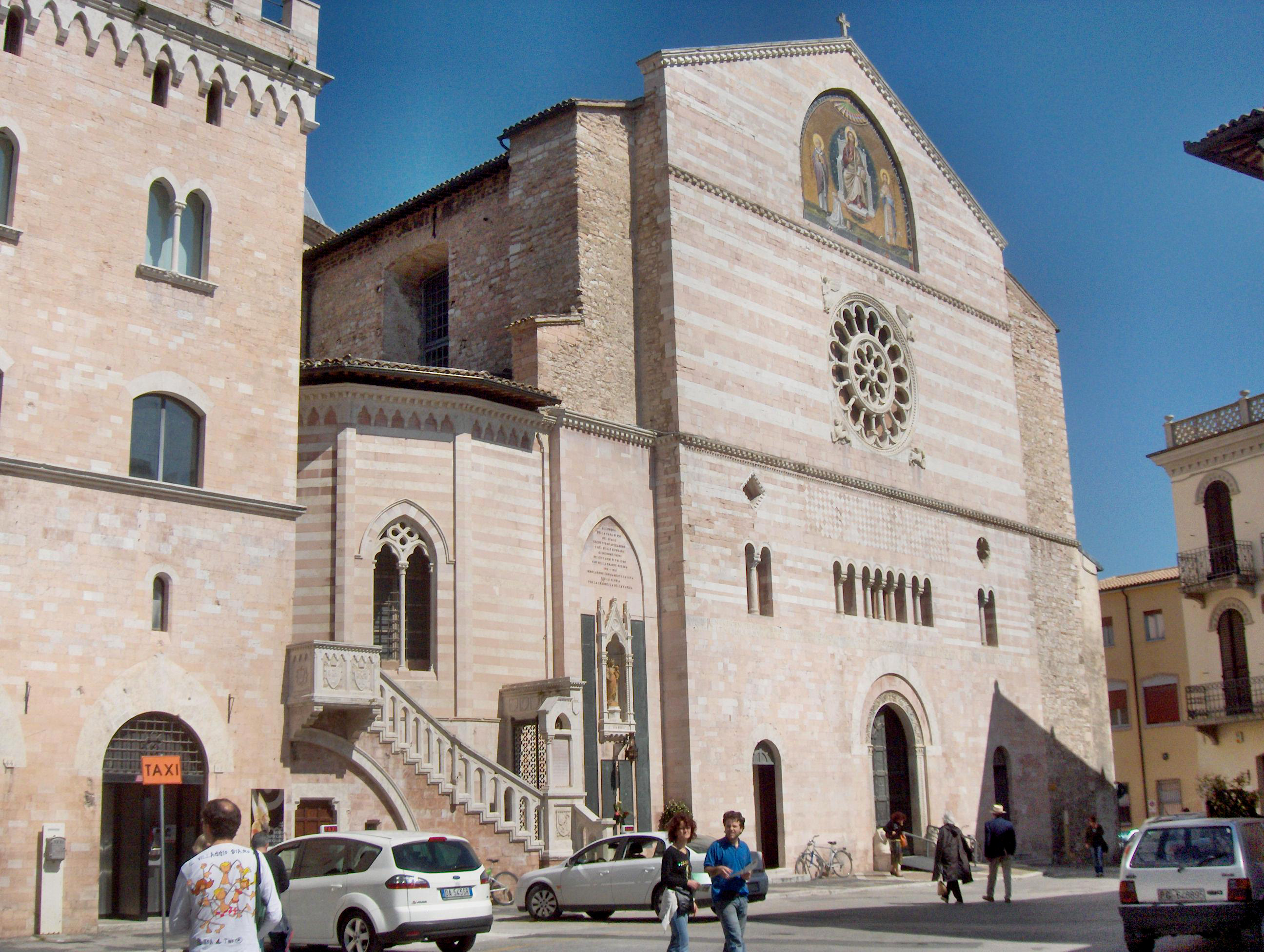
Main façade

Foligno Cathedral (Italian: Basilica Cattedrale di San Feliciano; Duomo di Foligno) is a Catholic cathedral situated on the Piazza della Repubblica in the center of Foligno, Italy. The cathedral, built on the site of an earlier basilica, is dedicated to the patron saint of the city, the martyr Felician of Foligno (San Feliciano), who was buried here in 251 AD. It is the seat of the Bishop of Foligno. It contains the cathedra for the Diocese of Foligno.

== History ==
The church was built in Romanesque style in the period 1133–1201. Bishop Marco began the construction in 1133. The renewed church was consecrated in 1149 by Cardinal Giulio di San Marcello.

The cathedral has two façades, the principal façade, or west front, facing the Piazza Grande, and the secondary façade facing the Piazza della Repubblica. The north transept and the secondary façade were commissioned in 1204 by Bishop Anselmo degli Atti, as attested by an inscription on the façade. The south transept was opened in 1513, giving the church its present Latin cross configuration.

== Façade ==
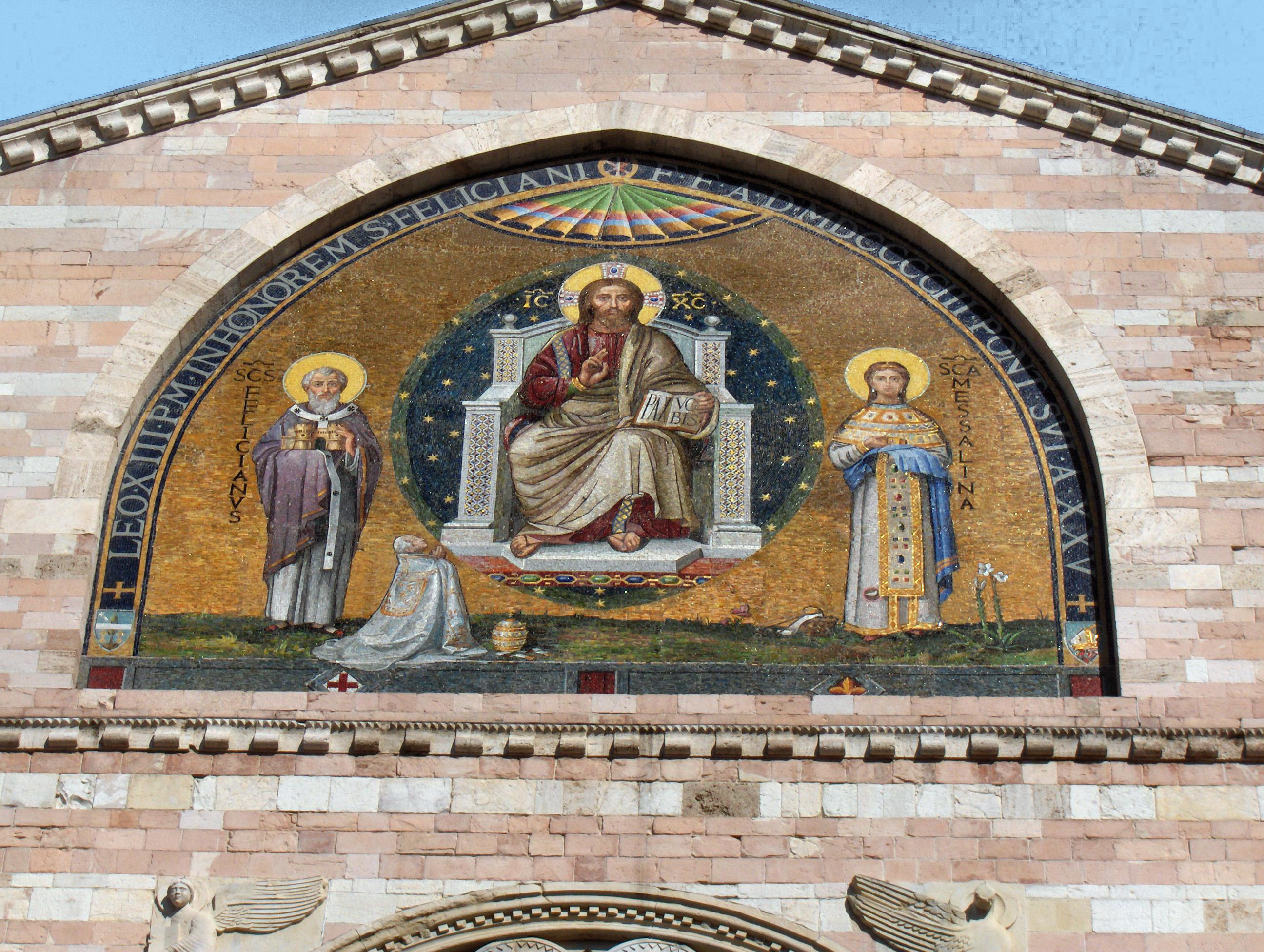
Mosaic on top of the façade

The principal façade was built in 1133, soon after Foligno had become a bishop. The upper tympanum is an addition from the 16th century. This façade was restored in 1904, when the mosaic in the tympanum, made in the workshop of the Vatican, was added. It shows Christ enthroned between Saints Felician and Messalina, with Pope Leo XIII, who had commissioned the mosaic, praying on his knees. The corners of the square around the rose window are decorated with the evangelistic symbols. The bronze door is flanked by two stone lions.

The secondary façade on the Piazza della Repubblica dates from 1201. It was commissioned by bishop Anselmo and is the work of the sculptors and architects Rodolfo and Binello. The upper part was finished by Ugolino III Trinci in the 14th century. It was enlarged in the 15th century and restored to something resembling the original in 1904 by the architect Vincenzo Benvenuti. It has multiple arches and three rose windows, of which the centre one, with its double pillars on the outside and twisted pillars on the inside, is among the most beautiful in Umbria. The two stone griffins underneath were sculpted to commemorate the victory of Foligno over Perugia. The carved wooden door is surrounded by five Romanesque arches decorated with bas-reliefs, representing Frederick Barbarossa and Pope Innocent III. The innermost arch is decorated with the signs of the zodiac, the stars, the sun, the moon, the hours and the attributes of the Four Evangelists. An inscription in the keystone of the upper arch says that "the stars, the sun, and the moon revealed a time of purity”. A new epoch of harmony was expected to begin between the Church and the Holy Roman Empire, as Pope Innocent III had just recognized Otto of Brunswick as Emperor Otto IV of the Holy Roman Empire.

The Gothic building on the left of the main façade is the baptistery of the cathedral. The steps next to it lead to the Palazzo delle Canoniche (Palace of the Canons).

== Interior ==
The interior of the cathedral has been redesigned and restored on several occasions. Its present grandiose interior is Neoclassical. The nave was enlarged in 1513 in the form of a Latin cross, and modified in the 16th century. The present appearance of the cathedral is attributable to the reconstruction by architect Giuseppe Piermarini (1734–1808) who removed earlier alterations. This local architect worked from the plans drawn by the architect and engineer Luigi Vanvitelli. Of the ancient Romanesque church, only the crypt remains. The cathedral was modified again at the beginning of the 20th century.

Among the most important works of art in the cathedral is the Chapel of the Sacrament by Antonio da Sangallo the Younger (1527). Vespasiano Strada and Baldassare Croce painted in this chapel two large frescoes depicting the life of San Feliciano. This saint is also represented by an elaborate silver statue. The canvases on the side walls date from the 13th - 19th centuries. The large fresco of Angela of Foligno in the apse dates from 1719 and is the work of Francesco Mancini (1679–1758). Among the other works of art are a Crucifixion, painted on wood by Niccolò Alunno and two busts of Roscioli spouses by the great Gian Lorenzo Bernini.

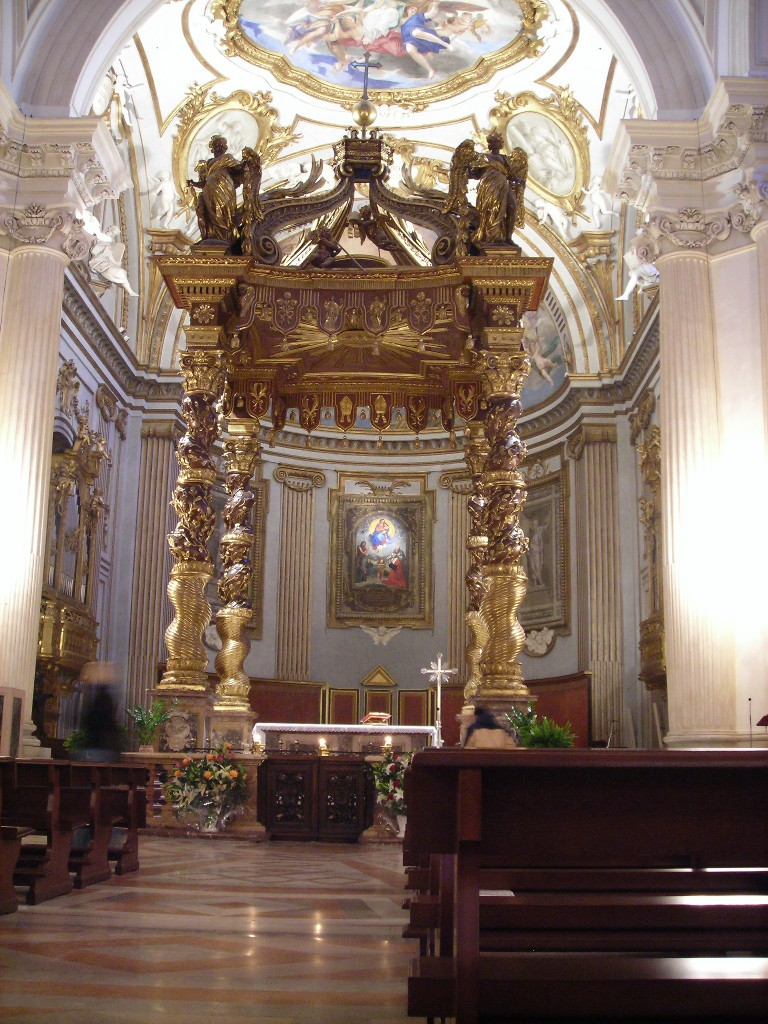
Baldacchino over altar.

The gilded Baroque baldachin over the main altar, built in the 18th century by Antonio Calcioni for the benefit of the family Salvi Roscioli, is a faithful reproduction of Bernini's baldacchino in St. Peter's Basilica in Rome. The arms of the Roscioli family appear at the base of the columns.

Twenty-six stucco statues of saints, the work of Brunelli and Ottaviani, are ranged in niches along the walls along with a new work by Cody Swanson depicting Saint Emygdius. This modern addition was commissioned by Giuseppe Betori, Cardinal of Florence, as a gift to replace an earlier version destroyed during the Second World War.

The elegant dome was added to the cathedral during the period 1543-1548 by the architect and woodworker Giuliano di Baccio d'Agnolo and Cola di Caprarola.

The upper part of the bell tower of the cathedral was renovated in 1847 by the architect Vitali, while the lower part is still original. Inside the campanile is the cell where the Blessed Pietro Crisci lived, decorated with frescoes from the 15th century.

It was in this cathedral that Angela of Foligno made her confession to the Franciscan Brother Arnaldo. This was a turning point in her life, as she embarked on the way of penance. Brother Arnaldo later became the writer of her revelations in the Book of Visions and Instructions.

During the 1997 earthquake, the cathedral suffered heavy damage, including the detachment of the façade, and was reopened in 1999. Damaged again during the 2016 earthquake, it is now closed and waiting for new works.
