= Arch of Augustus =

The Arch of Augustus may mean the triumphal arch of Augustus at any of the following sites:

- Arch of Augustus (Aosta)
- Arch of Augustus (Fano)
- Arch of Augustus (Rimini)
- Arch of Augustus, Rome
- Arch of Augustus (Susa)
- Etruscan Arch at Perugia
