= Salassi =

Ancient Alpine tribe

The Salassi or Salasses were a Gallic or Ligurian tribe dwelling in the upper valley of the Dora Baltea river, around present-day Aosta (Aosta Valley), during the Iron Age and the Roman period. They controlled the valley routes leading to the Great and Little St Bernard Passes and the gold deposits of the Dora Baltea basin. After resisting Roman expansion for more than a century, they were destroyed as a people in 25 BC by the army of Augustus, and their territory was given over to the new colony of Augusta Praetoria (modern Aoste).

== Name ==
They are mentioned as dià Salassō̃n (διὰ Σαλασσῶν) by Polybius (2nd c. BC) and Strabo (early 1st c. AD), as Salassi by Livy (late 1st c. BC), as Salassos by Pliny (1st c. AD), as Salasíon (Σαλασίον) by Ptolemy (2nd c. AD), and as Salassoí (Σαλασσοί) by Appian (2nd c. AD).

The origin of the name Salassi is uncertain. If Celtic, it may derive from the root sal-, though the word-formation admits of several explanations.

Ancient authors disagree on the tribe's affiliation. Cato the Elder, quoted by Pliny, linked the Salassi, like the neighbouring Lepontii, to the Taurisci and treated them as Celts, whereas Strabo and Pliny present them as Ligurians. In the sources for the war of 143 BC the Salassi are treated as Gauls: Orosius calls them Salassi Galli, and the Sibylline response that allowed the war to be resumed prescribed a sacrifice "whenever war was to be waged on the Gauls". Their Gallic or Ligurian character remains debated; Barruol considered them culturally closer to the Ligurians.

== Geography ==
The Salassi occupied the whole upper basin of the Dora Baltea, a territory bounded to the north by Mont Blanc, the Great St Bernard, the Grand Combin, the Matterhorn and Monte Rosa, and to the south by the Gran Paradiso massif. Their land carried the principal route from Italy across the western Alps, which divided at Aosta into a branch toward the Pennine pass (Great St Bernard) and a more westerly branch toward the pass in the territory of the Ceutrones (Little St Bernard). Cesare Letta has argued that before the conquest the Salassi held the plain of Ivrea as well as the valley. The Barrington Atlas locates their territory south of the Veragri, north of the Iemerii and Taurini, west of the Lepontii, Montunates and Votodrones, and east of the Ceutrones and Acitavones.

Rather than the passes themselves, the Salassi held the approach routes leading up to them, levying tolls on travellers while maintaining the roads and their bridgeworks; the passes proper lay in the hands of neighbouring peoples, the Ceutrones and the Veragri. Strabo nonetheless records that some of their holdings reached the Alpine crest. They obtained the salt they needed from Maurienne and the Tarentaise.

== History ==
=== Roman seizure of the gold district (143 BC) ===
The first Roman intervention is usually identified with the campaign of the consul Appius Claudius Pulcher in 143 BC, perhaps continuing into the two following years, possibly as late as 140 BC.

By the mid-2nd century the Salassi extended their influence to the foothills near Vercellae (modern Vercelli), and a dispute with the Libui over the waters of the Dora, which the Salassi diverted for their mining, drew in Rome on behalf of the plain-dwellers. After an initial defeat, the Senate consulted the Sibylline Books, whose prescription of a sacrifice in enemy territory allowed the war to be resumed and won. The southern part of the territory was confiscated as public land, but the tribe, pushed back into the mountains, retained the valley and the approaches to the passes.

=== Eporedia (100 BC) ===
In 100 BC the first colony of Roman citizens in the western Transpadana was founded at Eporedia (modern Ivrea), again on a Sibylline prescription. Strabo states that it was established as a garrison against the Salassi, but modern scholarship reads the foundation primarily as a measure to protect the mining interests of the district.

=== Tolls and resistance (43–34 BC) ===
The Salassi continued to control the approaches to the passes and to levy heavy tolls. In 43 BC Decimus Brutus, crossing toward Gaul by way of Eporedia, had to pay them a drachma for each man of his escort. In 35–34 BC the general Gaius Antistius Vetus blockaded the valley approaches for about two years; short of salt, the Salassi admitted Roman garrisons, then drove them out once resupplied. A further campaign attributed to Marcus Valerius Messalla Corvinus in 28–27 BC is sometimes said to have forced their surrender, though Ronald Syme doubts that Messalla achieved anything at any time and assigns the conquest itself to Varro. (Note: The dating of Messalla's campaign against the Salassi is disputed. Three authors connect him with the people in mutually discordant ways: Dio places the action within his summary of the Dalmatian campaign of 34 BC, Strabo has him buying firewood from the Salassi while in winter quarters, and Appian has him reduce them by famine after Actium. Most scholars take Dio to be in error and assign these operations to Messalla's governorship of Gaul in 28–27 BC. The proposal that these were an Illyrian tribe of Salassi, rather than the Alpine people, has been rejected.)

=== Destruction and Augusta Praetoria (25 BC) ===
In 25 BC the army of Augustus under Aulus Terentius Varro Murena conquered the Salassi and eliminated them as a people, an outcome later writers regarded as exceptionally harsh. (Note: Dio dates the conquest to 25 BC, alongside the Spanish campaigns of 26 and 25; some scholars place it in 26 BC. The commander is generally identified with Varro Murena, the later conspirator.) According to Strabo, some 36,000 of them were sold at auction at Eporedia, and the colony of Augusta Praetoria (Aosta) was founded on the site of Varro's camp; control of the Alpine routes thereby passed to Rome. The replacement of the indigenous capital's name by Augusta has been read as a sign of the tribe's annihilation, in contrast with neighbouring districts where Rome retained the native names.

The conquest was commemorated by the Arch of Augustus at Aosta. The Salassi are named among the gentes Alpinae devictae on the Tropaeum Alpium at La Turbie, listed between the Veragri and the Acitavones, although their subjugation in 25 BC preceded the monument's dedication in 7–6 BC by nearly two decades.

== Economy ==
The Dora Baltea basin held gold deposits that, according to Strabo, had been the foundation of the tribe's wealth and power before the Roman conquest; Strabo describes the extraction method, a form of gold-washing. The workings are commonly identified with the open-cast site of the Bessa (between modern Biella and Ivrea), near the settlement of Victimulae, which rests on matching Strabo's description to the archaeological remains. This connection has been drawn repeatedly but has also been debated by some scholars. Other localisations have been proposed: Perelli held the mines to be vein deposits further up the valley, while Giorcelli Bersani places them in the lower central valley of the Dora, at Tour d'Hérères, Émarèse and around Courmayeur.

The site of Bessa preserves extensive remains of alluvial gold-working, a network of channels for sorting the gravels and large spoil heaps, on a scale that has been taken to support the identification with the deposits Strabo describes. Finds from the site, including pottery and a coin hoard dated between the mid-2nd and early 1st century BC, indicate that extraction was under way before the first Roman operations, consistent with Strabo's statement that the Salassi worked the gold by water before the conquest. The centre of Victimulae, placed near present-day Cerrione and San Secondo, has been regarded as a former pagus of the Salassi, although Pliny locates Victimulae in the territory of Vercellae, and whether the mines fell under Vercellae or under Eporedia remains unresolved.

After the first Roman intervention the deposits were confiscated and leased to companies of public contractors (publicani); Pliny preserves a lex censoria (a censors' regulation) that capped the workforce of the Victimulae mines at five thousand, and Strabo reports that the Salassi, dispossessed of the mines but still holding the watercourses these required, sold water to the contractors, a recurring source of friction.
