= Bridge of Grand Arvou =

Aqueduct-bridge in Aosta, Italy

Coordinates: 45°45′30″N 7°19′41″E

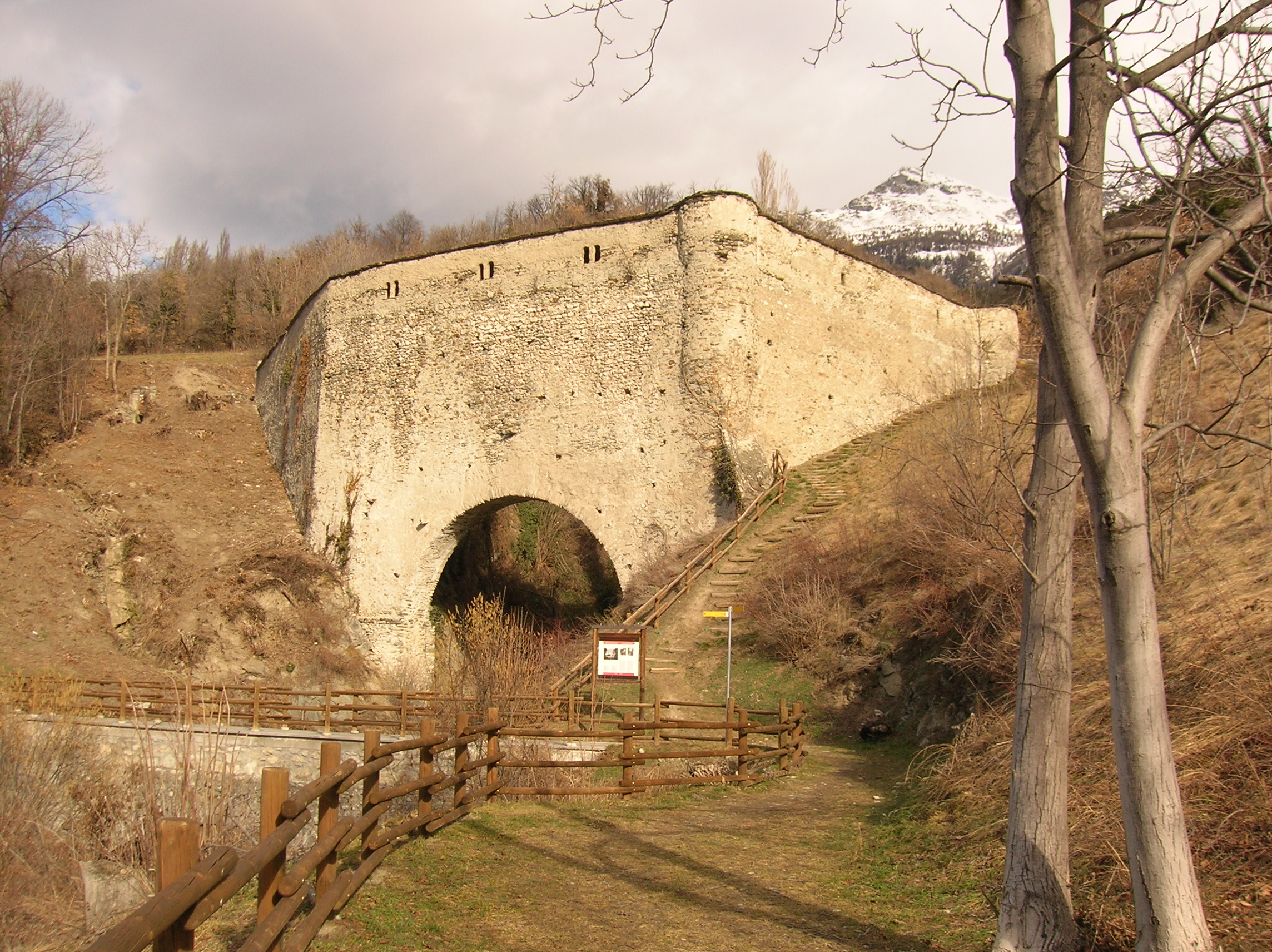
The Bridge of Grand Arvou

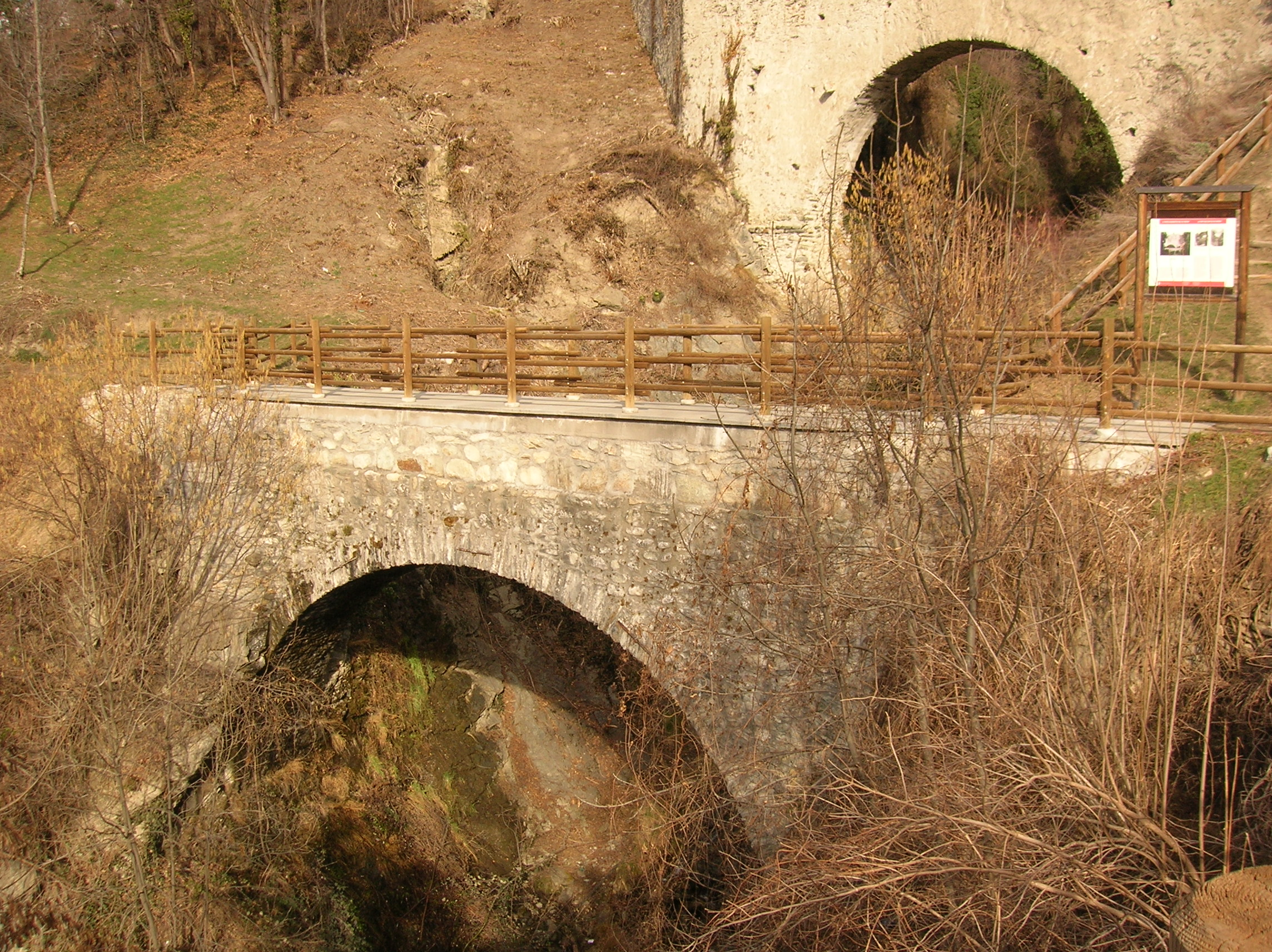
The Petit Arvou

The Bridge of Grand Arvou (Italian: Ponte acquedotto di Grand Arvou, French: Pont aqueduc du Grand Arvou) is an aqueduct-bridge in the frazione Porossan of Aosta, north-western Italy. It span the Rû Prévôt irrigation canal, and includes a large corridor covered by flagstones. Another aqueduct-bridge, the Petit Arvou, is located a few meters downstream.

== History ==
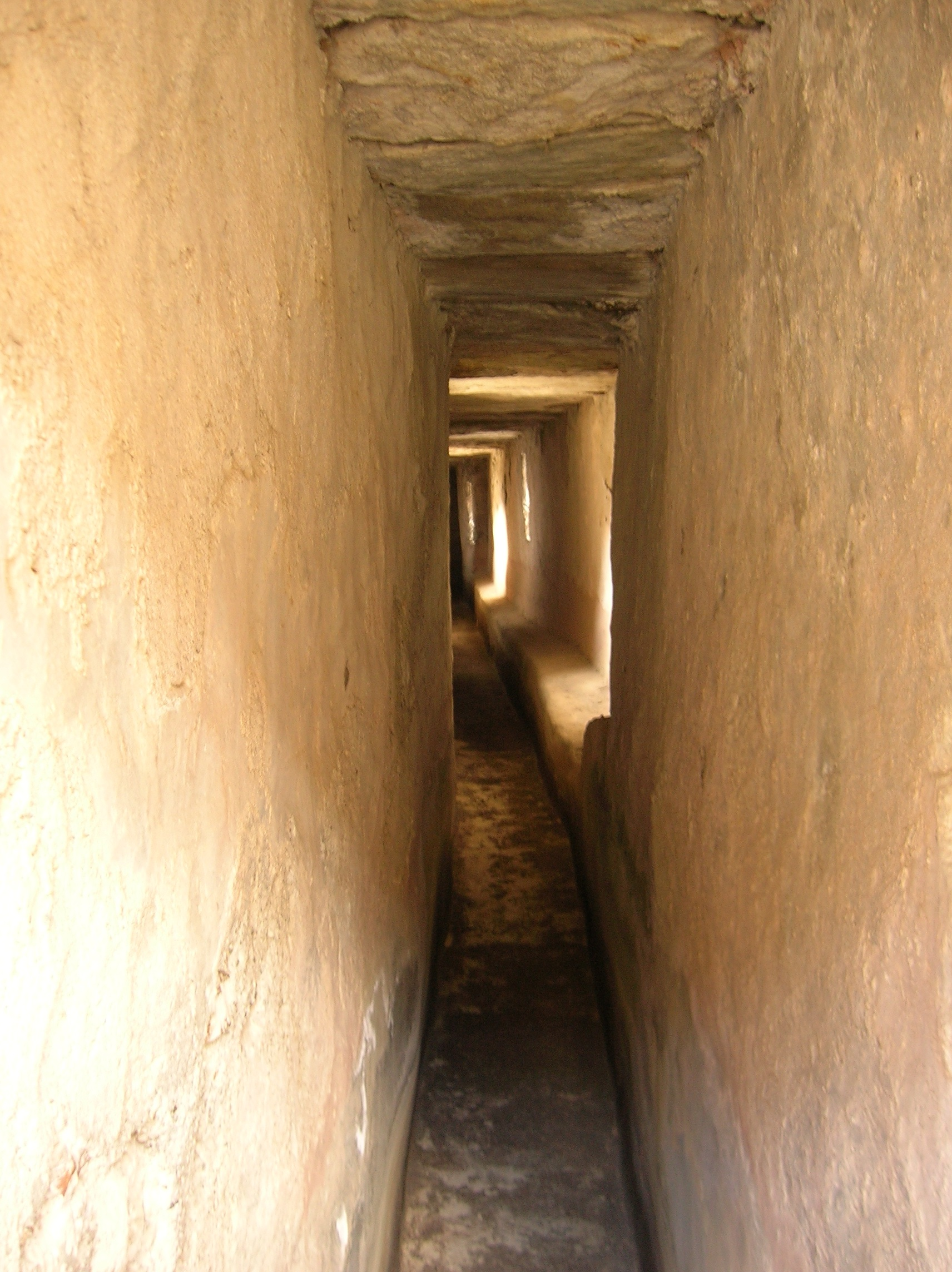
Interior view

In the late 13th-early 14th century, there was a series of programs aiming to improve the irrigation level in Aosta Valley, due to increased demand of animal husbandry. One of these was the construction of a canal, the Rû Prévôt, by will of Henry of Quart, provost (hence the name) of the Aosta Cathedral. This included also the pair of bridge-aqueducts which are now visible.

The income of the canal exploitation was later acquired by the Dukes (later Kings) of Savoy.

In the 20th century, the canal was mostly (11,9 km out of 12) channeled into pipes.

== Description ==
The Grand Arvou is an arch bridge, with a span of 68.5 m and an elevation of 13,60 m between the arch's top and the ground; the distance between the roof and the base of the arch is 10,5 m.

The bridge is built in mortar and small incoherent stones, with partial plastering. The plan is irregular, with a general trapezoidal shape, but without the main parallel side; the wall's thickness varies from 50 to 55 cm. The roof is covered by flagstones, which helped it resist to the centuries.
