= Aosta =

Capital city of the Aosta Valley, Northern Italy

Aosta Aoste (French)
- Comune
- Città di Aosta; Ville d'Aoste
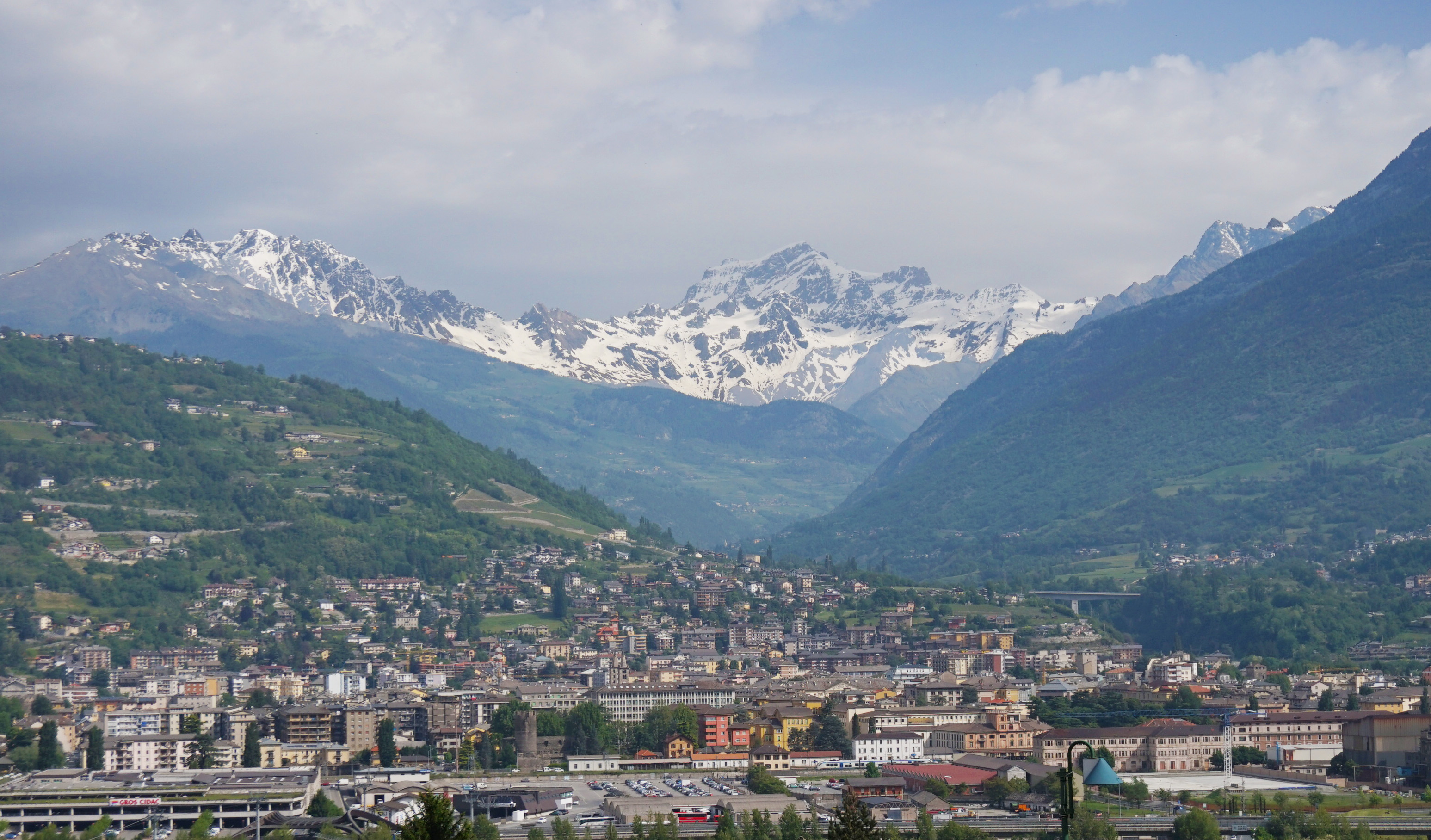
- Aerial view of Aosta

- Flag Coat of arms

- Location within Aosta Valley Location within Italy Location within Europe
- Coordinates: 45°44′N 7°19′E
- Country: Italy
- Region: Aosta Valley
- Frazioni: Arpuilles, Beauregard, Bibian, Bioulaz, Borgnalle, Brenloz, Busséyaz, Cache, La Combe, Les Capucins, Chabloz, Champailler, Collignon, Cossan, Cotreau, Duvet, Entrebin, Excenex, Les Fourches, Laravoire, Montfleury, Movisod, Pallin, Papet, Pléod, Porossan, La Riondaz, La Rochère, Roppoz, Saraillon, Saumont, Seyssinod, Signayes, Talapé, Tsanté, Tzambarlet, Vignole

Government
  - Mayor: Raffaele Rocco (Ind.)

Area
  - Total: 21.39 km^{2} (8.26 sq mi)
- Elevation: 583 m (1,913 ft)

Population (2026)
  - Total: 33,127
  - Density: 1,549/km^{2} (4,011/sq mi)
- Demonyms: Italian: aostani; French: Aostois; Arpitan: veullatsù
- Time zone: UTC+1 (CET)
  - Summer (DST): UTC+2 (CEST)
- Postal code: 11100
- Dialing code: 0165
- Patron saint: St. Gratus
- Saint day: September 7
- Website: Official website

Aosta (Note: English: UK: /ɑːˈɒstə/ ah-OST-ə, US: /ɑːˈɔːstə/ ah-AW-stə, Italian: [aˈɔsta].) (official French: Aoste; (Note: Pronounced [ɔst] in Aostan French and [aɔst] in Standard French, formerly known as Aouste.) Valdôtain: Aoûta) (Note: Pronounced [ˈuta], and also known as Ohta [ˈohta] or Veulla [ˈvəla]; Walser: Augschtal or Ougstal; Piedmontese: Osta.) is the capital and largest city of the Aosta Valley, a bilingual region in the Alps, 110 km (68 mi) north-northwest of Turin in Italy. It has 33,127 inhabitants.

It is situated near the Italian entrance of the Mont Blanc Tunnel and the Great St Bernard Tunnel, at the confluence of the Buthier and the Dora Baltea, and at the junction of the Great and Little St Bernard Pass routes.

== History ==
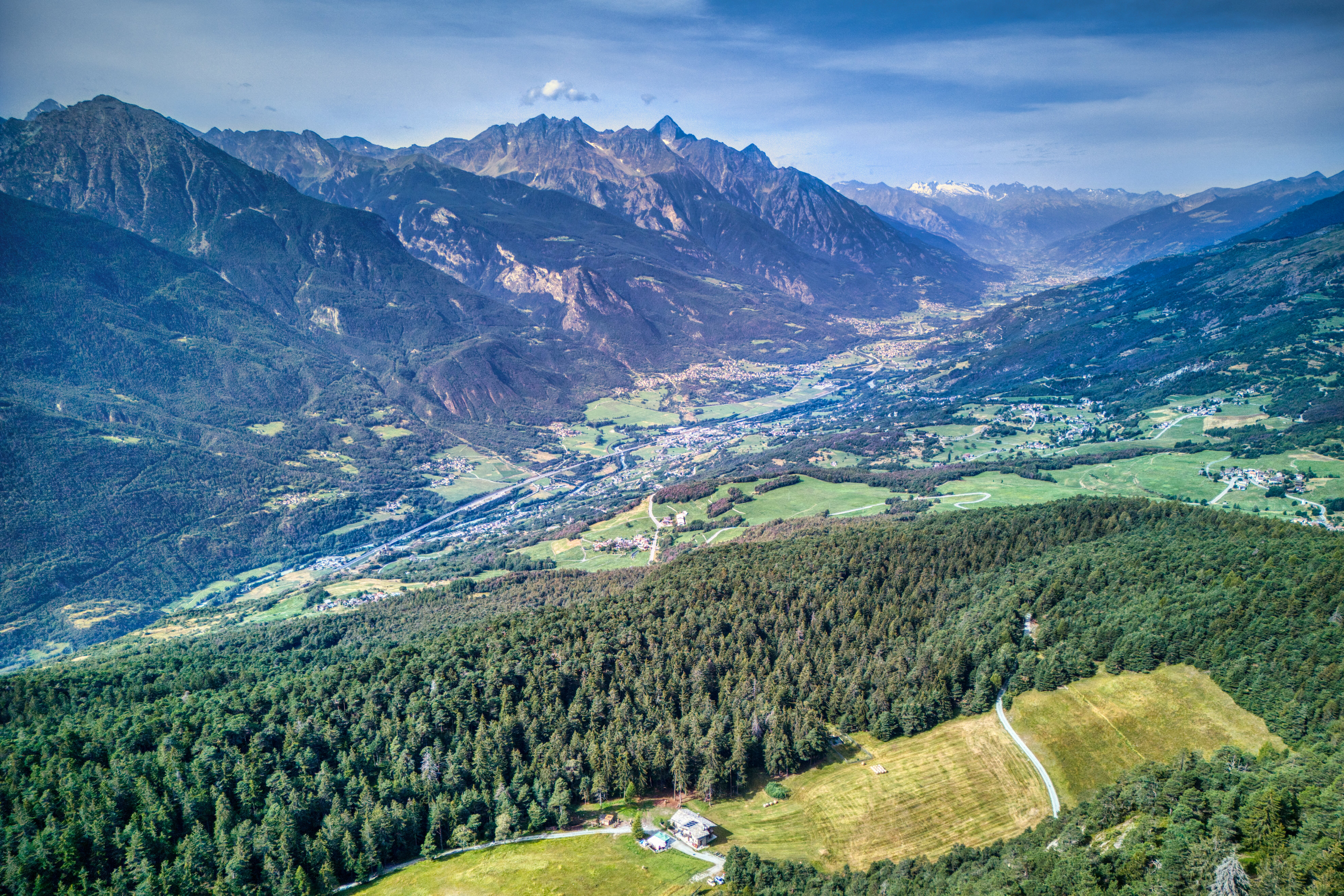
View of the plaine aostoise and the Monte Emilius

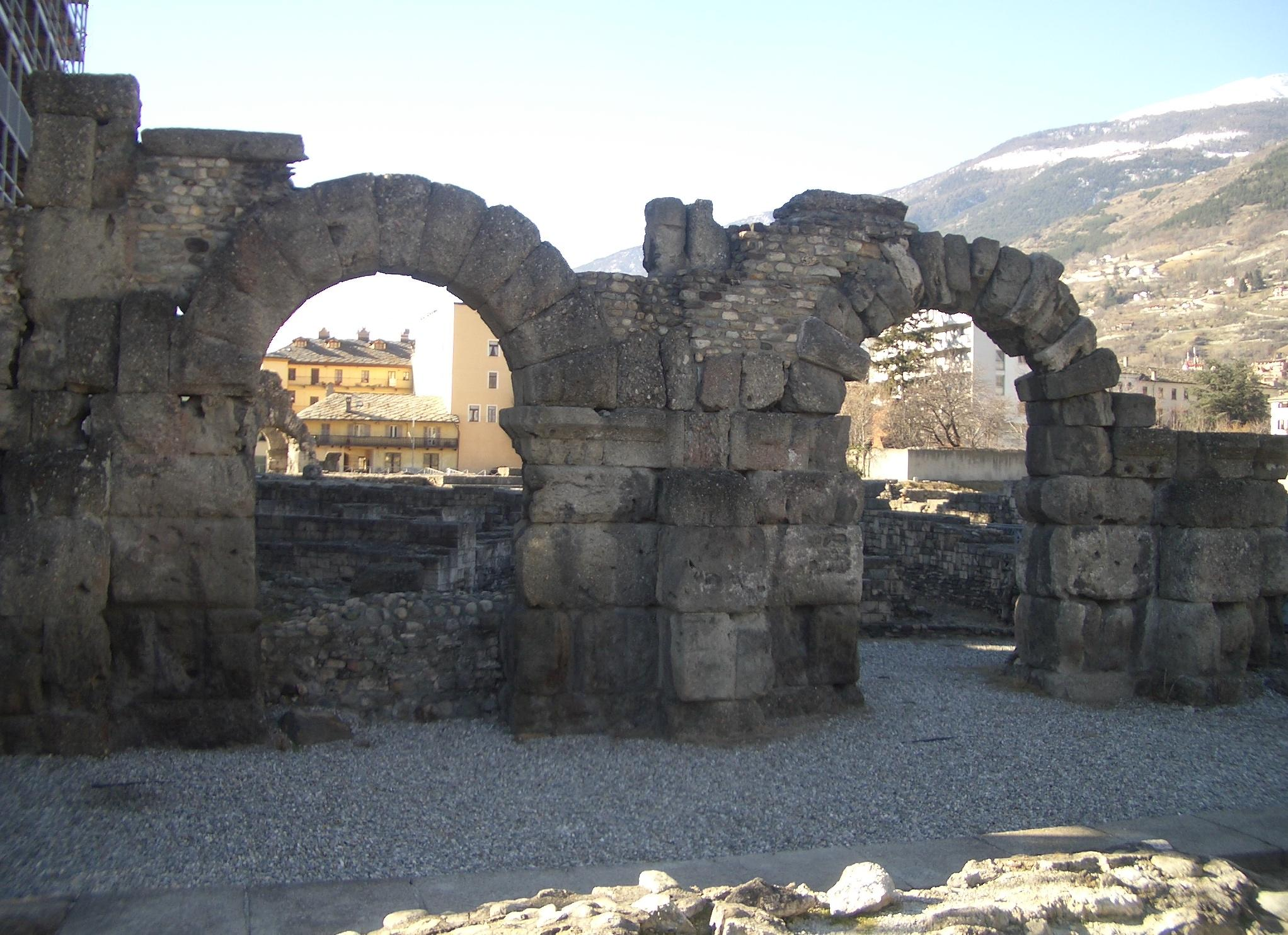
Arches of the Roman Theatre

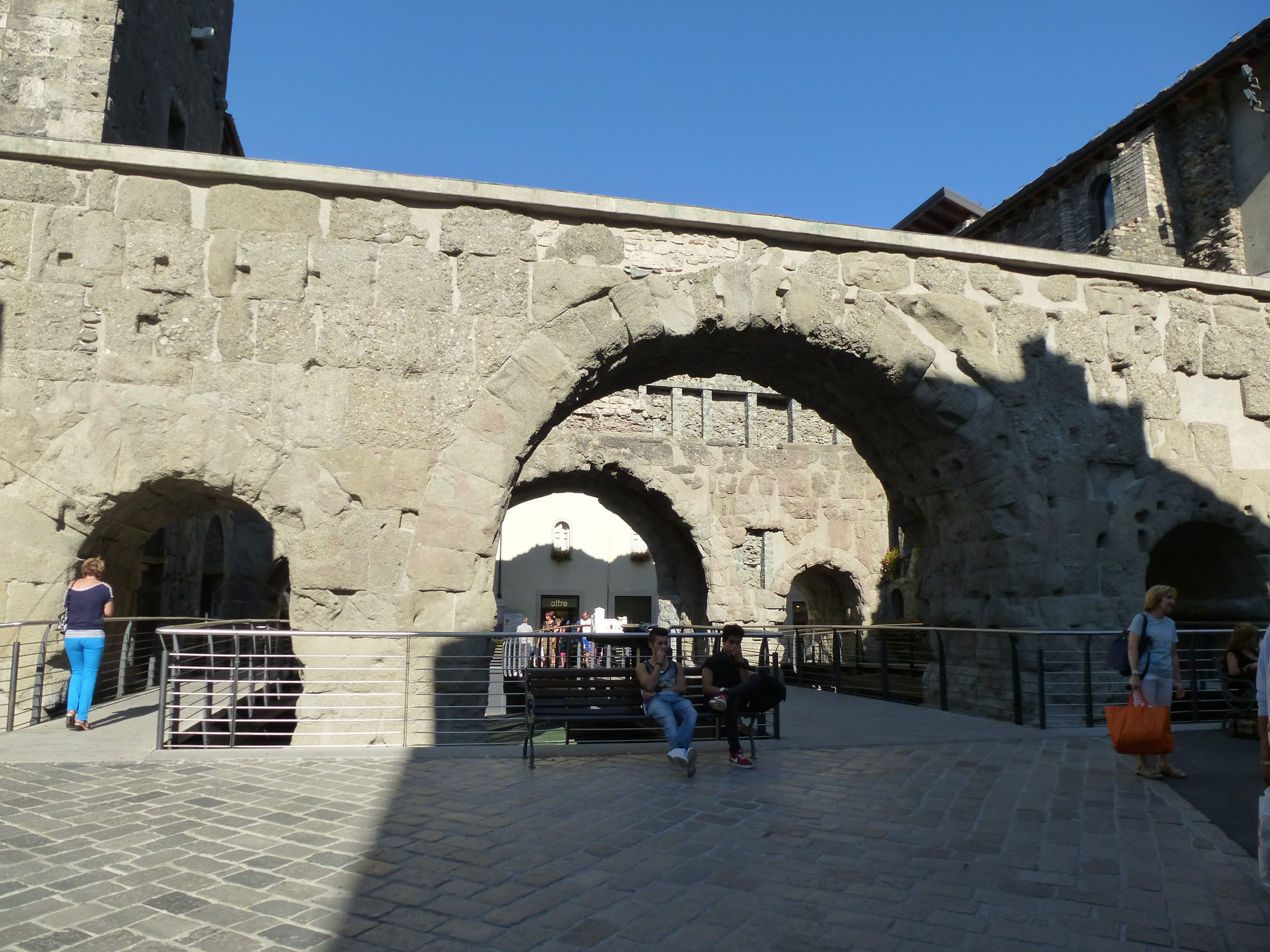
Porta Prætoria

Aosta was settled in proto-historic times and later became a centre of the Salassi, many of whom were killed or sold into slavery by the Romans in 25 BC. The campaign was led by Terentius Varro, who then founded the Roman colony of Augusta Praetoria Salassorum, housing 3,000 retired veterans. After 11 BC Aosta became the capital of the Alpes Graies province of the Empire. Its position at the confluence of two rivers, at the end of the Great and the Little St Bernard Pass, gave it considerable military importance, and its layout was that of a Roman military camp.

After the fall of the Western Empire, the city was conquered, in turn, by the Burgundians, the Ostrogoths, and the Byzantines. The Lombards, who had annexed it to their Italian kingdom, were expelled by the Frankish Empire under Pepin the Short. Under his son, Charlemagne, Aosta acquired importance as a post on the Via Francigena, leading from Aachen to Italy. After 888 AD it was part of the renewed Kingdom of Italy under Arduin of Ivrea and Berengar of Friuli.

In the 10th century Aosta became part of the Kingdom of Burgundy. After the fall of the latter in 1032, it became part of the lands of Count Humbert I of Savoy.

The privilege of holding the assembly of the states-general was granted to the inhabitants in 1189. An executive council was nominated from this body in 1536, and continued to exist until 1802. After the Congress of Vienna restored the rule of Savoy it was reconstituted and formally recognized by Charles Albert of Sardinia, at the birth of his grandson Prince Amedeo, who was created duke of Aosta.

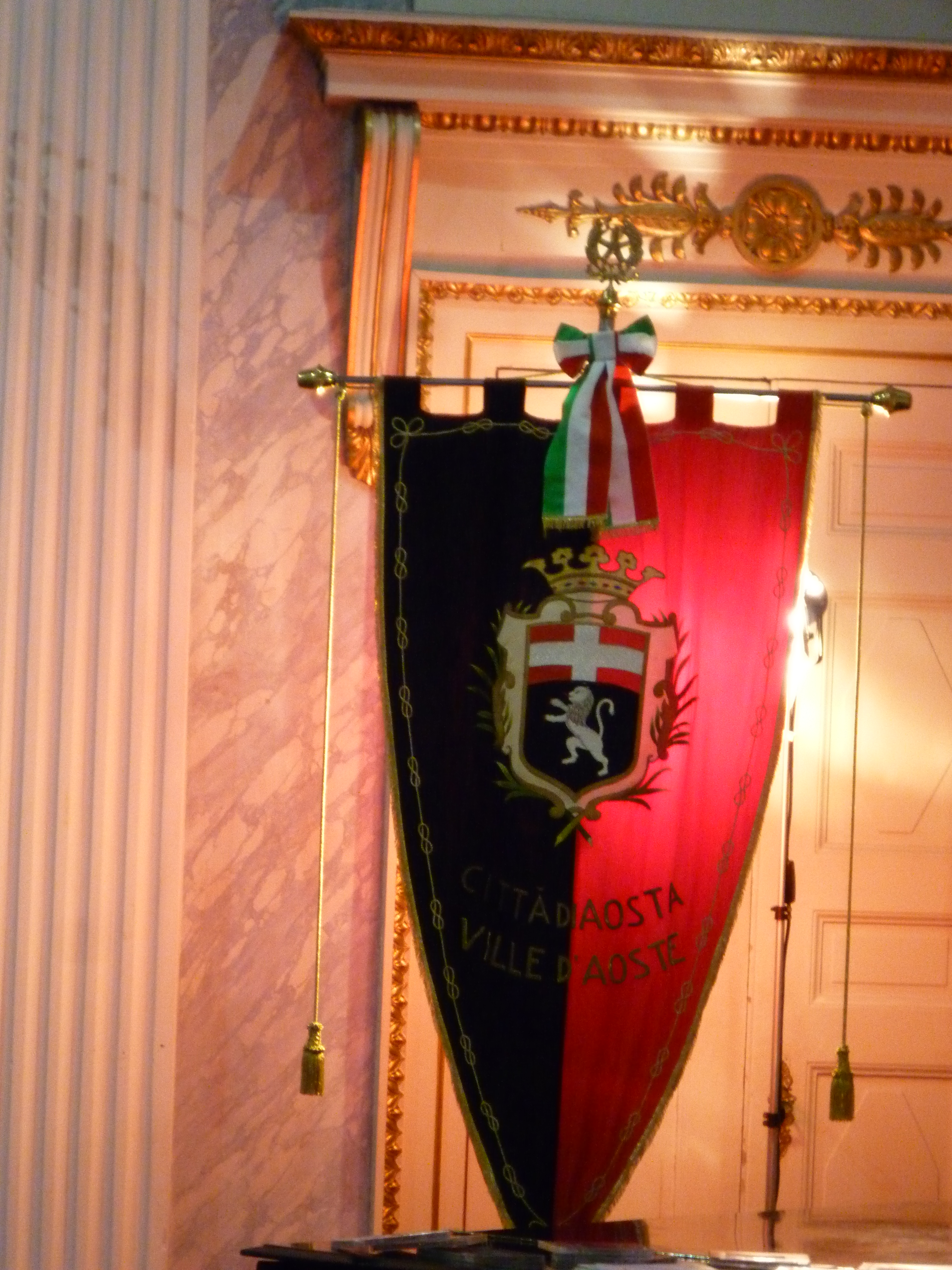
The gonfalon of Aosta/Aoste in the salon ducal of the Hôtel-de-Ville

== Climate ==
Aosta is in the rain shadow of the Mont Blanc massif and features a humid subtropical climate (Köppen: Cfa), bordering on a cool semi-arid climate (Köppen: BSk), also bordering on an oceanic climate (Köppen: Cfb) and under the Köppen climate classification due to its low average annual rainfall. It is considered temperate oceanic (Trewartha: Do) in the Trewartha climate classification.

The city experiences cool to very cold winters, hot summers and relatively dry conditions throughout the year.

Climate data for Aosta (1991–2020 normals), 547 m asl, extremes since 1984
Month	Jan	Feb	Mar	Apr	May	Jun	Jul	Aug	Sep	Oct	Nov	Dec	Year
Record high °C (°F)	22.9 (73.2)	26.0 (78.8)	26.3 (79.3)	29.3 (84.7)	32.2 (90.0)	40.4 (104.7)	36.5 (97.7)	38.0 (100.4)	34.0 (93.2)	32.0 (89.6)	23.0 (73.4)	21.7 (71.1)	40.4 (104.7)
Mean daily maximum °C (°F)	6.2 (43.2)	10.0 (50.0)	14.6 (58.3)	18.1 (64.6)	21.5 (70.7)	25.1 (77.2)	28.8 (83.8)	28.1 (82.6)	23.1 (73.6)	17.6 (63.7)	11.5 (52.7)	5.1 (41.2)	18.3 (64.9)
Daily mean °C (°F)	1.5 (34.7)	4.2 (39.6)	8.4 (47.1)	11.6 (52.9)	15.8 (60.4)	19.2 (66.6)	22.2 (72.0)	21.5 (70.7)	17.5 (63.5)	12.2 (54.0)	6.4 (43.5)	0.8 (33.4)	11.7 (53.1)
Mean daily minimum °C (°F)	−3.2 (26.2)	−1.7 (28.9)	2.2 (36.0)	5.3 (41.5)	9.7 (49.5)	13.3 (55.9)	15.5 (59.9)	14.9 (58.8)	11.7 (53.1)	6.8 (44.2)	1.4 (34.5)	−3.4 (25.9)	6.0 (42.8)
Record low °C (°F)	−17.6 (0.3)	−15.0 (5.0)	−15.9 (3.4)	−8.6 (16.5)	−3.8 (25.2)	4.0 (39.2)	7.0 (44.6)	6.2 (43.2)	−3.7 (25.3)	−12.6 (9.3)	−14.1 (6.6)	−18.1 (−0.6)	−18.1 (−0.6)
Average precipitation mm (inches)	33.1 (1.30)	19.1 (0.75)	37.3 (1.47)	28.9 (1.14)	48.9 (1.93)	41.2 (1.62)	27.9 (1.10)	27.2 (1.07)	27.0 (1.06)	42.8 (1.69)	52.9 (2.08)	28.0 (1.10)	414.3 (16.31)
Average precipitation days (≥ 1 mm)	4.1	3.9	4.7	4.5	7.4	7.3	5.5	5.1	4.1	5.3	4.9	5.0	61.8
Source: Météo Climat

== Demographics ==
Historical population
Year	Pop.	±%
1861	8,231	—
1871	7,749	−5.9%
1881	7,376	−4.8%
1901	7,554	+2.4%
1911	7,008	−7.2%
1921	9,554	+36.3%
1931	13,962	+46.1%
1936	16,130	+15.5%
1951	24,215	+50.1%
1961	30,633	+26.5%
1971	36,906	+20.5%
1981	37,194	+0.8%
1991	36,214	−2.6%
2001	34,062	−5.9%
2011	34,102	+0.1%
2021	33,223	−2.6%
Source: ISTAT

As of 2026, the population is 33,127, of which 47.4% are male, and 52.6% are female. Minors make up 13.5% of the population, and seniors make up 29.0%.

=== Immigration ===
As of 2025, immigrants make up 13.7% of the population. The 5 largest foreign countries of birth are Morocco, Romania, Albania, the Dominican Republic, and France.

== Sights ==
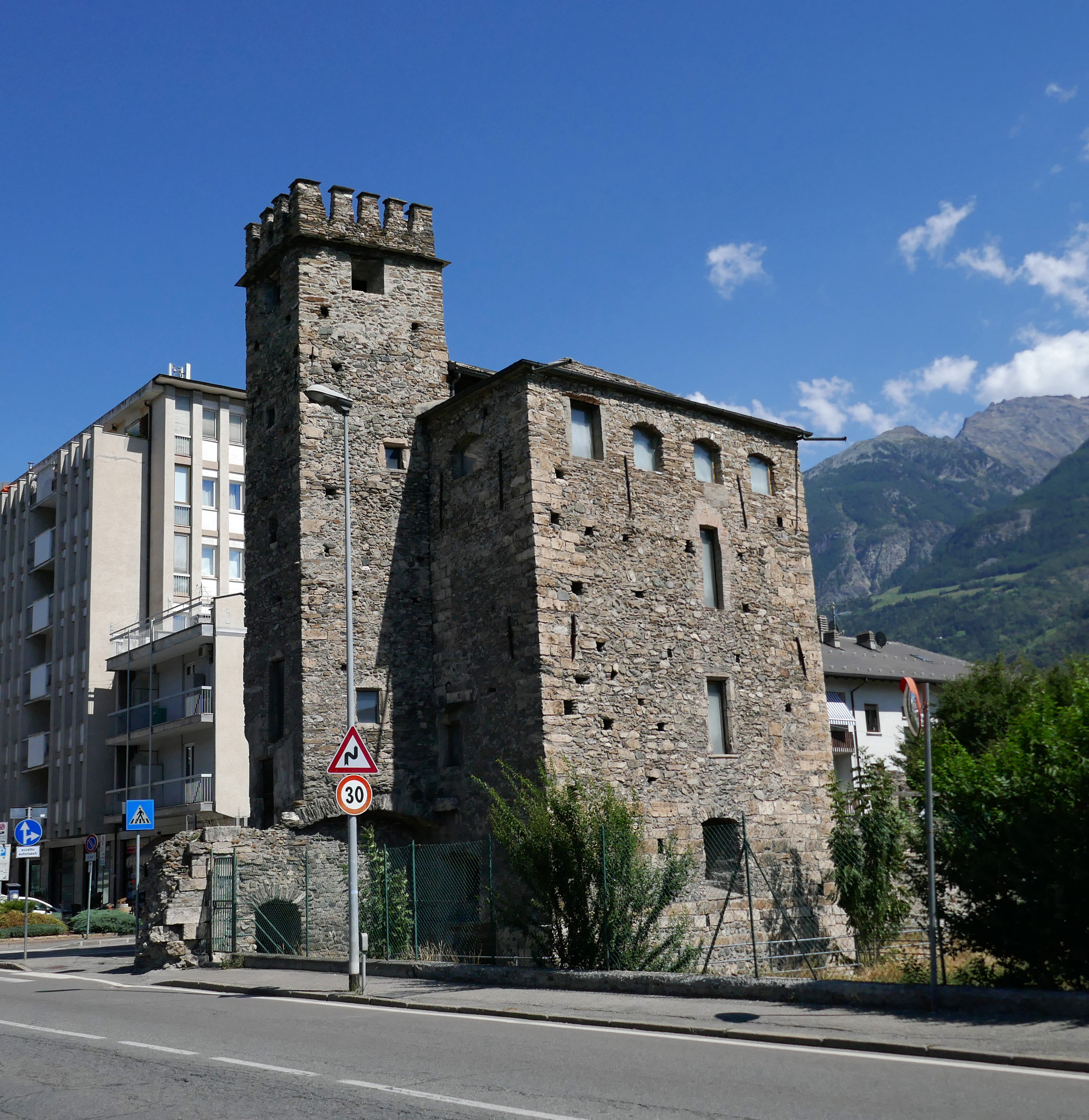
Tour du Lépreux

The ancient town walls of Augusta Prætoria Salassorum are still preserved almost in their entirety, enclosing a rectangle 724 by 572 metres (2,375 by 1,877 ft). They are 6.4 metres (21 ft) high, built of concrete faced with small blocks of stone. At the bottom, the walls are nearly 2.75 metres (9.0 ft) thick, and at the top 1.83 metres (6.0 ft).

Towers stand at angles to the enceinte and others are positioned at intervals, with two at each of the four gates, making twenty towers in total. They are roughly 6.5 metres (21 ft) square, and project 4.3 metres (14 ft) from the wall. Of the 20 original towers, the following are well preserved:

- Tour du Lépreux (French for Leper's Tower), was given this name after a leper called Pierre-Bernard Guasco who was jailed there in the late 17th century. Le lépreux de la cité d'Aoste, a novel by Xavier de Maistre, is also named after this leper.
- Tourneuve (13th century).
- Tour du Pailleron.
- Tower (Castle) of Bramafan, built in the 11th century over a Roman bastion. It was the residence of the Savoy viscounts. In Franco-Provençal, Bramé la fan means "To scream for hunger".
- Tour du Baillage.
- Tour Fromage.

The south and east gates exist intact. The latter, a double gate with three arches flanked by two towers known in Latin as the Porta Prætoria (It. Porta pretoriana, Fr. Porte prétorienne, 1st century AD) was the eastern gate to the city, and has preserved its original form apart from the marble covering. It is formed by two series of arches enclosing a small square.

The rectangular arrangement of the streets is modeled on a Roman plan dividing the town into 64 blocks (insulae). The main road, about 10 metres (33 ft) wide, divides the city into two equal halves, running from east to west. This arrangement makes it clear that guarding the road was the main raison d'être of the city.

The Roman theatre, of which the southern façade remains today, is 22 metres (72 ft) tall. The structure, dating from the late reign of Augustus, occupied an area of 81 by 64 metres (266 by 210 ft); it could contain up to 4,000 spectators. In the nearby was the amphitheatre, built under Claudius. A marketplace surrounded by storehouses on three sides with a temple in the centre with two on the open (south) side, as well as a thermae, have also been discovered.

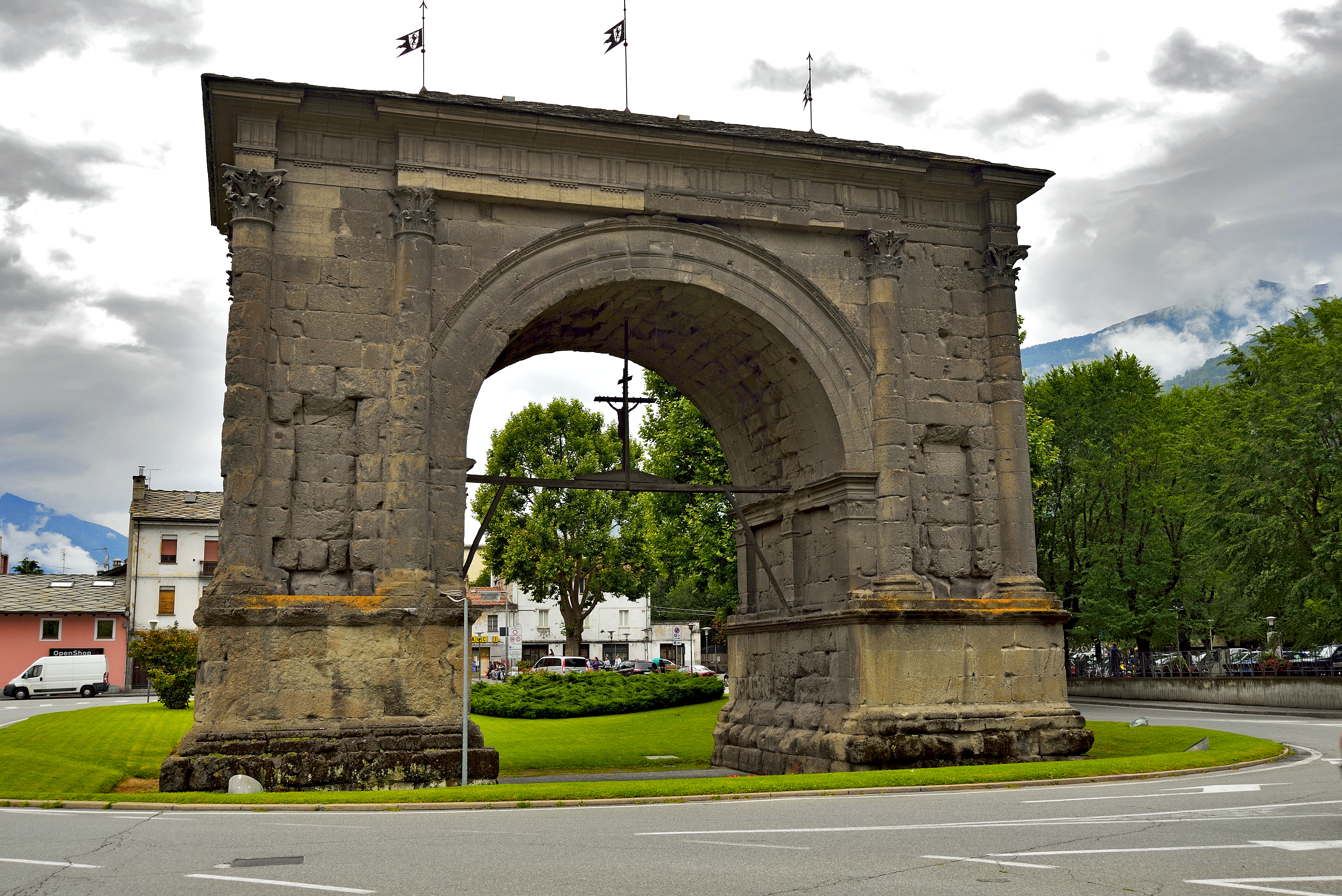
Arch of Augustus

Outside the town walls is the Arch of Augustus, a triumphal arch in honour of Augustus, built in 35 BC to celebrate the victory of consul Varro Murena over the Salassi. About 8 kilometres (5 miles) to the west is a single-arched Roman bridge, called the Pont d'Aël. It has a closed passage, lighted by windows for foot passengers in winter, and above it an open footpath.

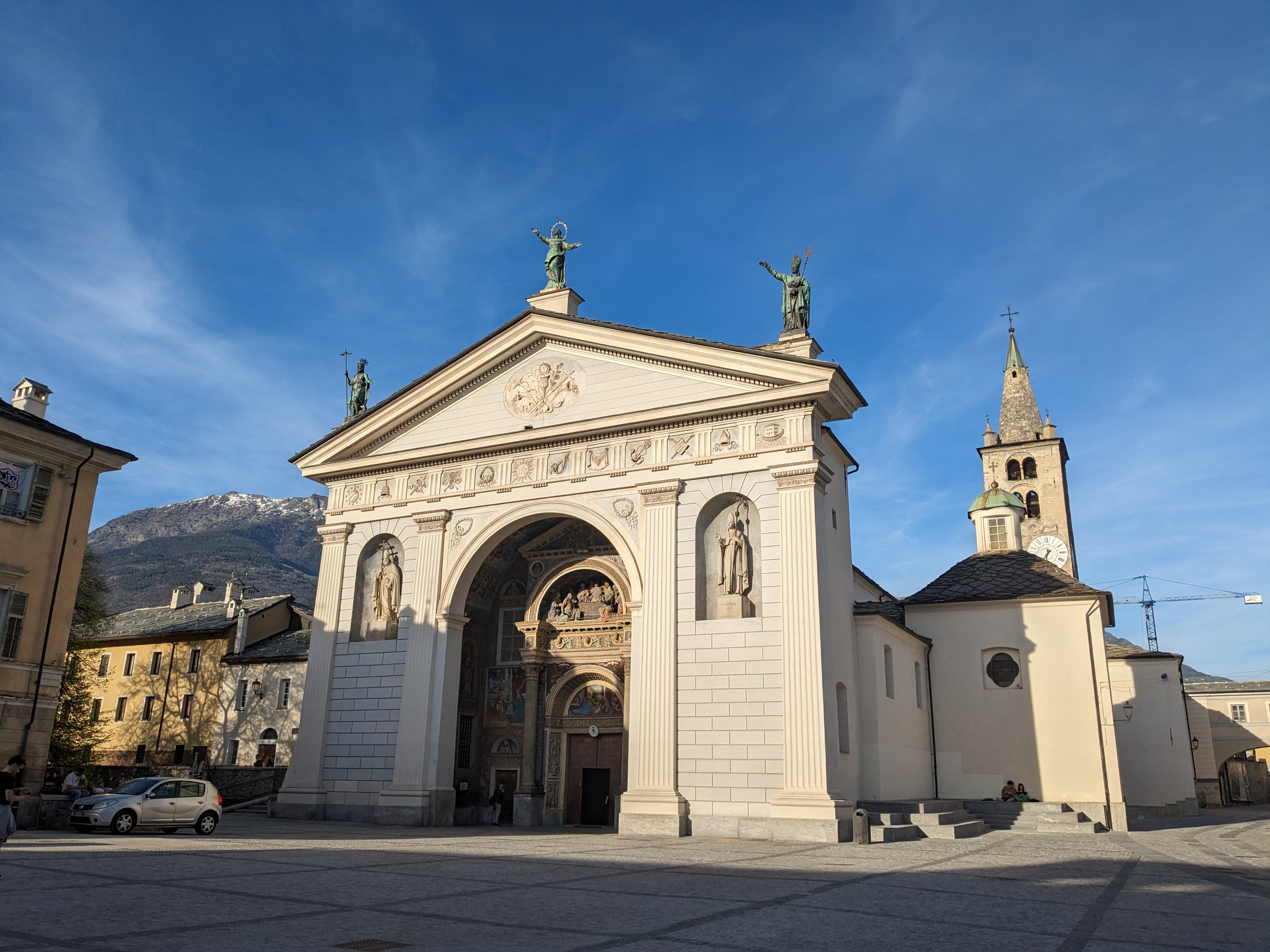
Aosta Cathedral

There are considerable remains of the ancient road from Eporedia (modern Ivrea) to Augusta Praetoria into the Aosta Valley. The modern railway follows this route, notable for the Pont Saint-Martin, which has a single arch with a span of 35 metres (115 ft) and a roadway 4.5 metres (15 ft) wide; the cutting of Donnas; and the Roman bridges of Cillian (Saint-Vincent), Aosta (Pont de Pierre).

Other sights include:

- Saint-Martin-de-Corléans Megalithic Area with artifacts and tombs dating to the Neolithic era.
- The Cathedral, built in the 4th century and replaced in the 11th century by a new edifice dedicated to the Madonna. It is annexed to the Roman Forum.
- The Romanesque-Gothic Collegiate church of Saint Ursus (Saint-Ours). Its most evocative feature is the cloister, which can be entered through a hall on the left of the façade. It is dedicated to Ursus of Aosta.
- The Saint-Bénin College, built about 1000 by the Benedictines. It is now an exhibition site.
- The Bridge of Grand Arvou, a medieval arch bridge-aqueduct.

== Transport ==
Aosta lies on the crossroad of two major trans-alpine trunk roads: national road 26 (Italian: SS26, French: RN26) connecting the city of Chivasso to Little St Bernard Pass on the Italy-France border, and national road 27 (Italian: SS27, French: RN27) connecting the city of Aosta to the Great St Bernard Pass on the Italy-Switzerland border. Aosta is also served by the A5 motorway between Turin and Courmayeur.

Aosta railway station, opened in 1886, forms part of the Chivasso–Ivrea–Aosta railway. Direct trains only connect Aosta up to the city of Ivrea. The branch line to nearby Pré-Saint-Didier, in the Valdigne, on the way towards Courmayeur was closed in 2015. Train service is operated by Trenitalia.

The main bus hub is located near the Aosta train station. Buses connect the city of Aosta to the nearby valleys and to destinations outside the region, including Turin, Milan, Chamonix (France) and Martigny (Switzerland).

Aosta airport is located 5 km to the east of the city. However, there are currently no scheduled services at the airport. The nearest airports to the city are Turin Airport which is located 65 km (40 mi) south and Geneva Airport, is located 109 km (68 mi) north west of Aosta.

== Sport ==
In 1993, the city hosted the inaugural 1993 European Youth Olympic Winter Days. Aosta also submitted an official bid to host the 1998 Winter Olympics, but the games were ultimately awarded to Nagano, Japan.

== Notable people ==
- List of mayors of Aosta
- Anselm of Aosta (1033–1109), Archbishop of Canterbury from 1093 to 1109.
- Xavier de Maistre (1763–1852), writer of Le lépreux de la cité d'Aoste ("The leper from Aosta", 1811).
- Laurent Cerise (1807–1869), a French physician born in Aosta
- Innocenzo Manzetti (1826–1877), an Italian inventor born in Aosta.

== International relations ==
=== Twin towns – sister cities ===
Aosta is twinned with:

- Chamonix-Mont-Blanc, France
- Kaolack, Senegal
- Martigny, Switzerland
- Narbonne, France
- Sinaia, Romania

== See also ==
- Duke of Aosta
- Franco-Provençal language - Valdôtain dialect.
- Aostan French
- Category:Towers in Italy
- Category:Tribes involved in the Gallic Wars
