= Ursus of Aosta =

Italian saint

Saint Ursus of Aosta
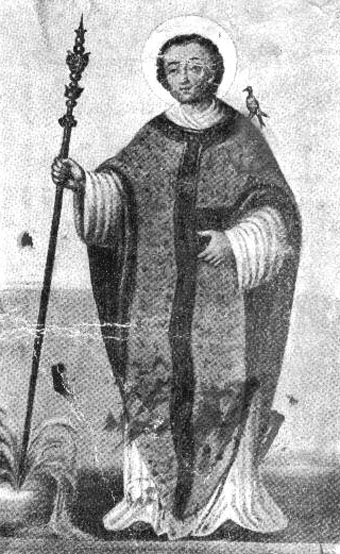
- Died: 6th century Aosta
- Venerated in: Roman Catholic Church; Eastern Orthodox Church
- Canonized: Pre-congregation
- Major shrine: Collegiate church of Saint Ursus
- Feast: February 1; June 21 (Burano)
- Attributes: archdeacon with a staff and book, bearing birds on his shoulder; wearing fur pelisse in a religious habit; striking water from a rock; or giving shoes to the poor.
- Patronage: Ivrea; Cogne; invoked in childbirth; children who die before baptism; invoked against faintness, kidney disease, and rheumatism

Ursus of Aosta (Italian: Sant'Orso d'Aosta; French: Saint Ours d'Aoste; fl. 6th century) was an Italian evangelist of the 6th century, today venerated as a saint. His feast day is February 1.

== Biography ==
Originally thought to have been of Irish origin, historians seem to agree that he came from the Val d’Aosta. He became a monk at the Abbey of San Giusto in Aosta. Ursus was later appointed archdeacon for Jucundus (in Italian, San Giocondo; in French, Saint Joconde), bishop of Aosta. He built the Church of San Lorenzo, which became the Collegiate church of Saint Ursus in Aosta. He evangelized the region of Digne and was an opponent of Arianism.

== Patronage ==
Ursus is a patron saint of Burano.

The Fiera di Sant’Orso in Aosta is held annually on January 30th and 31st.
