= Arch of Augustus (Fano) =

Coordinates: 43°50′35″N 13°0′52.5″E

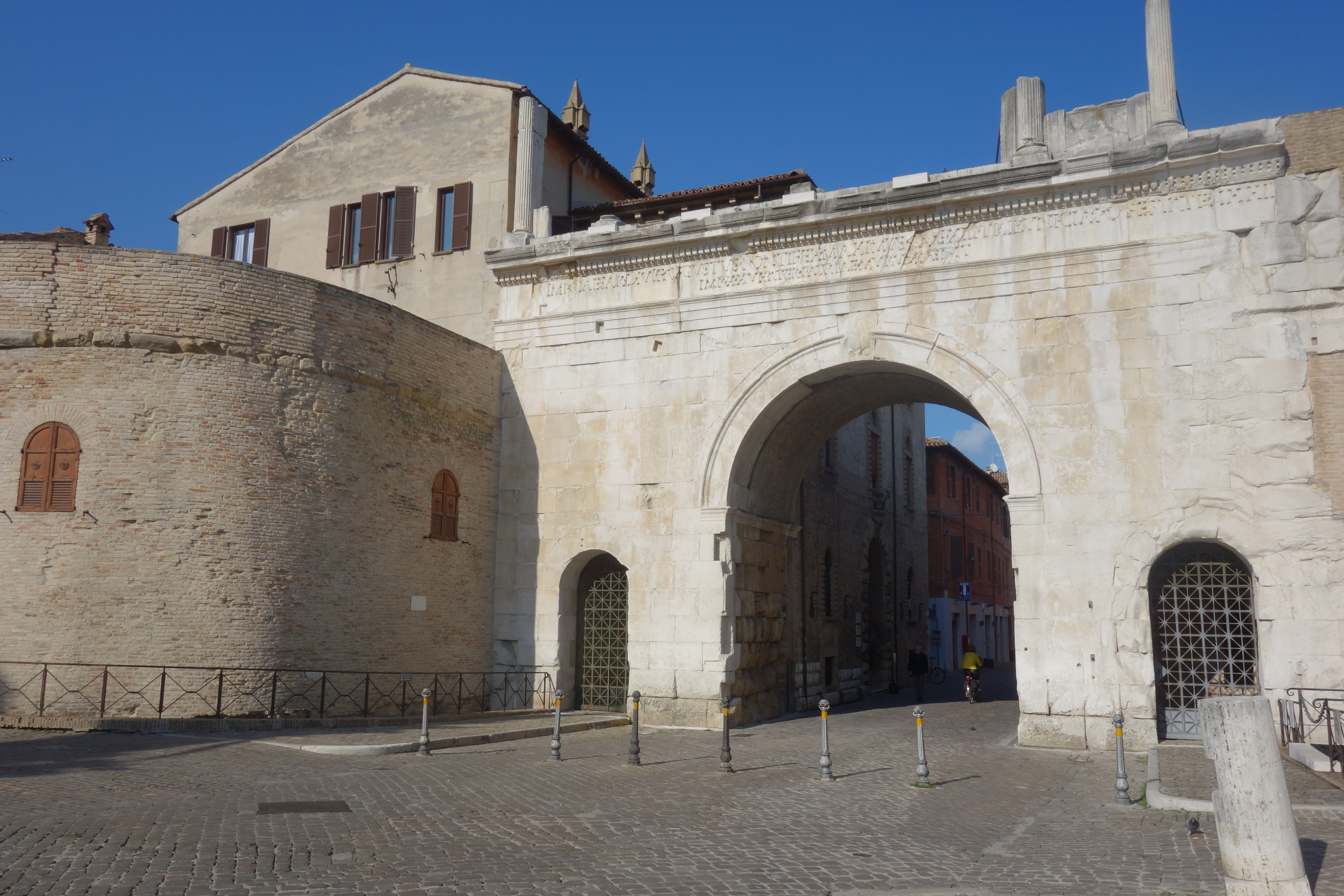
Arch of Augustus

The Arch of Augustus in Fano (in the Province of Pesaro and Urbino) is a city gate in the form of a triumphal arch with three vaults. It is the entrance to the city by the via Flaminia, which became the inside of the wall of the decumanus maximus. It is one of the symbols of the city.

== History ==
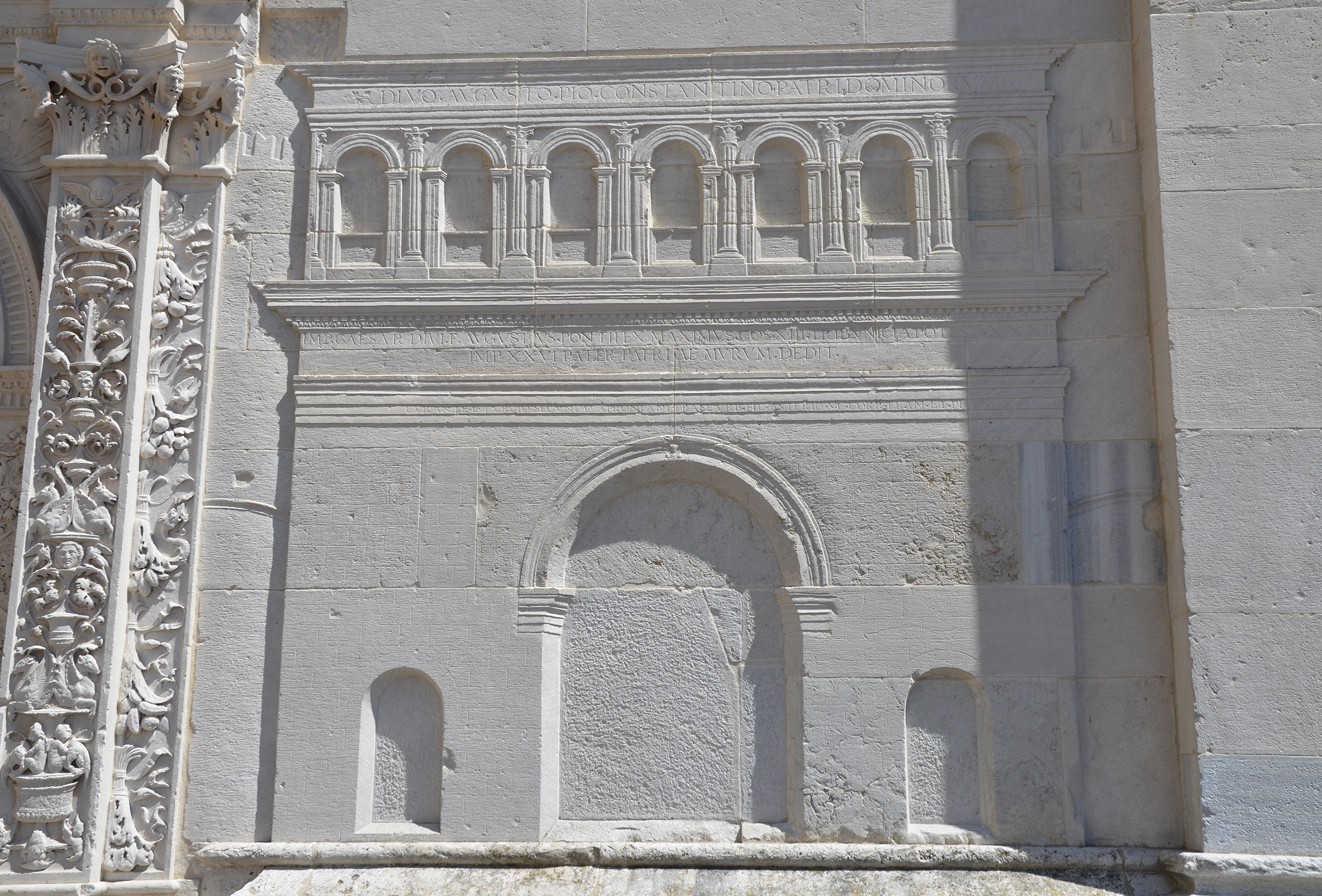
The Arch of Augustus, intact, in the bass-relief of the facade of the neighbouring church of St Michael

In the Roman period it was the principal gate of Colonia Julia Fanestris, a colonia established in the town of Fanum Fortunae (temple of Fortuna) by the Roman architect Vitruvius at the command of the Emperor Augustus, in commemoration of the victory over the Carthaginian general Hasdrubal Barca in the Battle of Metauro during the Second Punic War.

It is presumed that at least two other (now lost) gates existed in Fanum Fortunae, one to the south and the other near the sea.

Constructed at the point at which the Via Flaminia met the decumanus maximus of the city, the monument is dated to AD 9 by means of an inscription located on the frieze, with large characters carved in the rock which were once gilded in bronze. The inscription reports:

IMP. CAESAR DIVI F. AVGVSTVS PONTIFEX MAXIMVS COS. XIII TRIBVNICIA POTESTATE XXXII IMP. XXVI PATER PATRIAE MVRVM DEDIT Imperator Caesar Augustus son of a god, Pontifex Maximus, Consul 13 times, recipient of tribunician power 32 times, acclaimed imperator 26 times, father of his country donated this wall.

The arch was later rededicated by the Emperor Constantine I with a new inscription on the attic which is now lost, but the earlier inscription was not erased.

In 1463, during the siege of the city in order to expel its lord Sigismondo Pandolfo Malatesta, the artillery of Federico da Montefeltro, destroyed the attic of the monument. The fallen fragments were reused in the construction of the adjacent church and loggia of Saint Michael. The original appearance of the gate is recorded in the Renaissance bass relief carved on one side of the facade of the church.

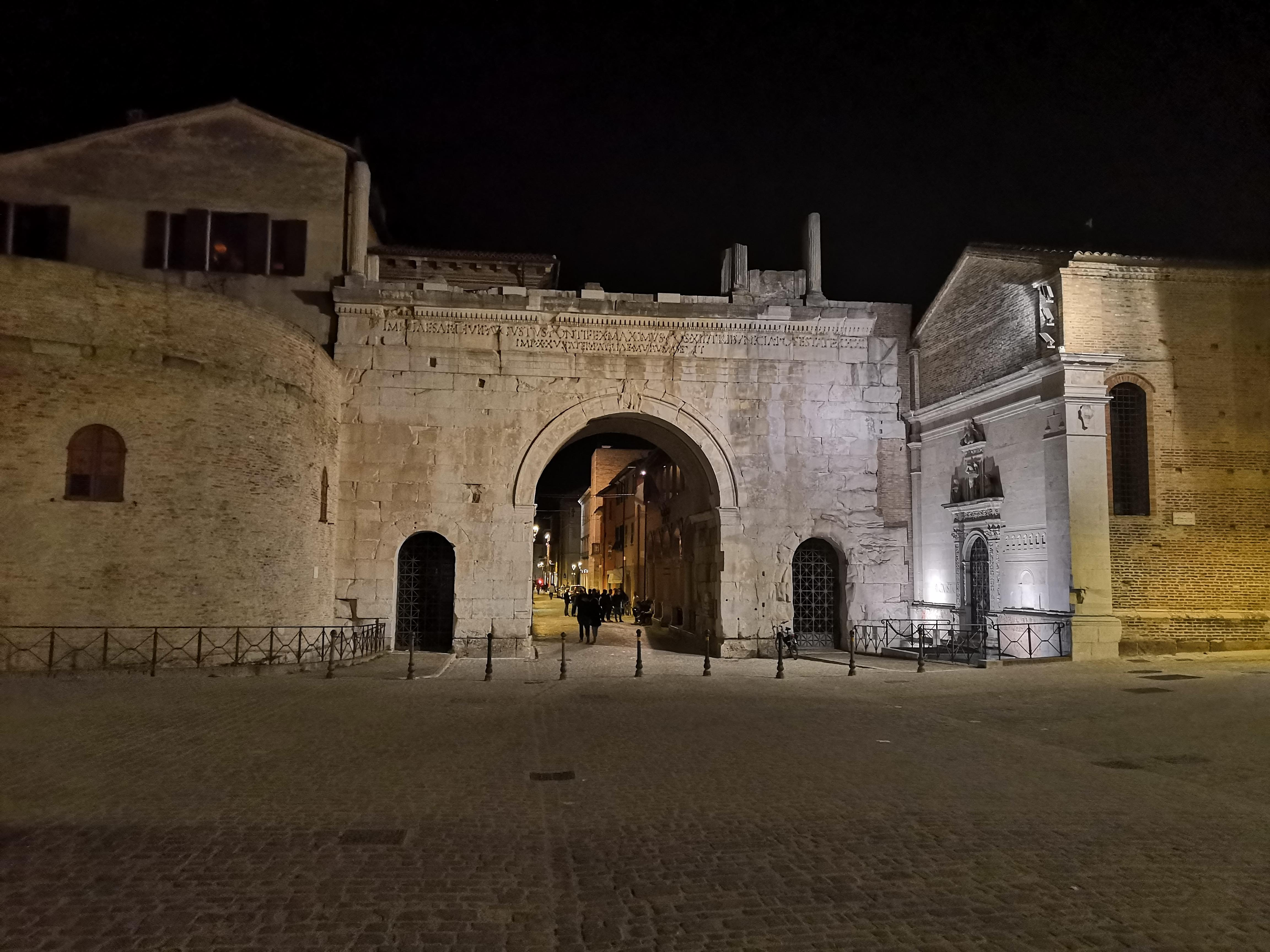
Arch of Augustus at night

== Description ==
Faced with opus quadratum from blocks of Istrian stone, the monument consists of two minor lateral arches and a larger central arch; the keystone of the latter is decorated with an image of an animal, which is no longer recognisable but which most probably depicted an elephant. The main body, still well preserved, supported a large attic which is now lost, with a Corinthian pseudo-portico, in which there were seven arched windows separated by eight pseudo-columns. The whole monument has many stylistic similarities with the Augustan gates of Spello, Aosta and particularly with Authon in Provence.

== See also ==
- List of Roman triumphal arches

== Bibliography ==
- P. M. Amiani, Dissertazione critico-lapidaria sopra l'antico Arco di Fano innalzato dall'Imperatore Cesare Augusto, Fano 1772.
- A. Aleandri, Memoria istorica sull'Arco d'Augusto esistente in Fano da "Raccolta di opuscoli scientifici e filosofici" tomo XLI, Venezia 1785.
- G. Colucci, Delle antichità di Fano della Fortuna in "Antichità Picene", IX, Fermo, 1790.
- P. Mancini, Illustrazione dell'Arco di Augusto in Fano, Pesaro 1826.
- L. Poletti, Intorno all'Arco di Augusto in Fano in "Giornale Arcadico di Scienze, Lettere ed Arti", XXXIV, Roma 1827.
- W. B. Clarke, Sull'Arco di Augusto di Rimini e sulla porta di Fano in "Annali dell'Istituto di Corrispondenza Archeologica", XIII, for 1841 (1842), pp. 116–120.
- F. Poggi, Origini e antichità di Fano, Fano 1895.
- L. A. Richmond, Commemorative Arches and City in the Augustean Age, in "Jur. Rom. Stud.", XXIII, 1933.
- F. Frigerio, Antiche porte di città italiche e romane, Como 1935.
- P. C. Borgogelli-Ottaviani, Fano e le sue vestigia romane in "Atti e memorie della Dep. di Storia Patria per le Marche", Ancona 1941.
- R. Weiss, L'Arco d'Augusto di Fano nel Rinascimento in "Italia Medioevale e Umanistica", III, Padova 1965.
- G. Berardi, Fano romana-Basilica di Vitruvio Fano 1967.
- Adolfo Gandiglio, Carmen in Arcum Augusti Fanestrum ex voluminis II "Humanitatis" fasciculo I (excerptum et separatim impressum) da: Re publica Sancti Marini - typis Reffi et Della Balda - succ. Angelii et soc. - 1916.
- Giuseppe Castellani, L'Arco d'Augusto in Fano, carne Latino con la traduzione metrica, Fano 1916.
- I. Di Stefano-Manzella, Documenti inediti sugli Archi Augusteii di Fano e di Rimini (1823-1825) in "Rendiconti Accademia Nazionale dei Lincei", Serie VIII, vol. XXXII, Roma 1978.
- Valeria Purcaro, Osservazioni sulla "Porta Augustea" di Fano, in "Rendiconti Accademia Nazionale dei Lincei", Serie VIII, vol. XXXVII, fasc. 5-6, Roma 1982.
- Franco Battistelli; Aldo Deli, Immagine di Fano romana Cassa di Risparmio di Fano 1983.
- Mario Luni, Archeologia nelle Marche, Dalla preistoria all'Età tardoantica, ISBN 88-404-1175-5, pag 228
- Luciano De Sanctis, Quando Fano era romana, Fano 1999.
