= Aostan French =

Dialect of French spoken in Italy

- français valdôtain
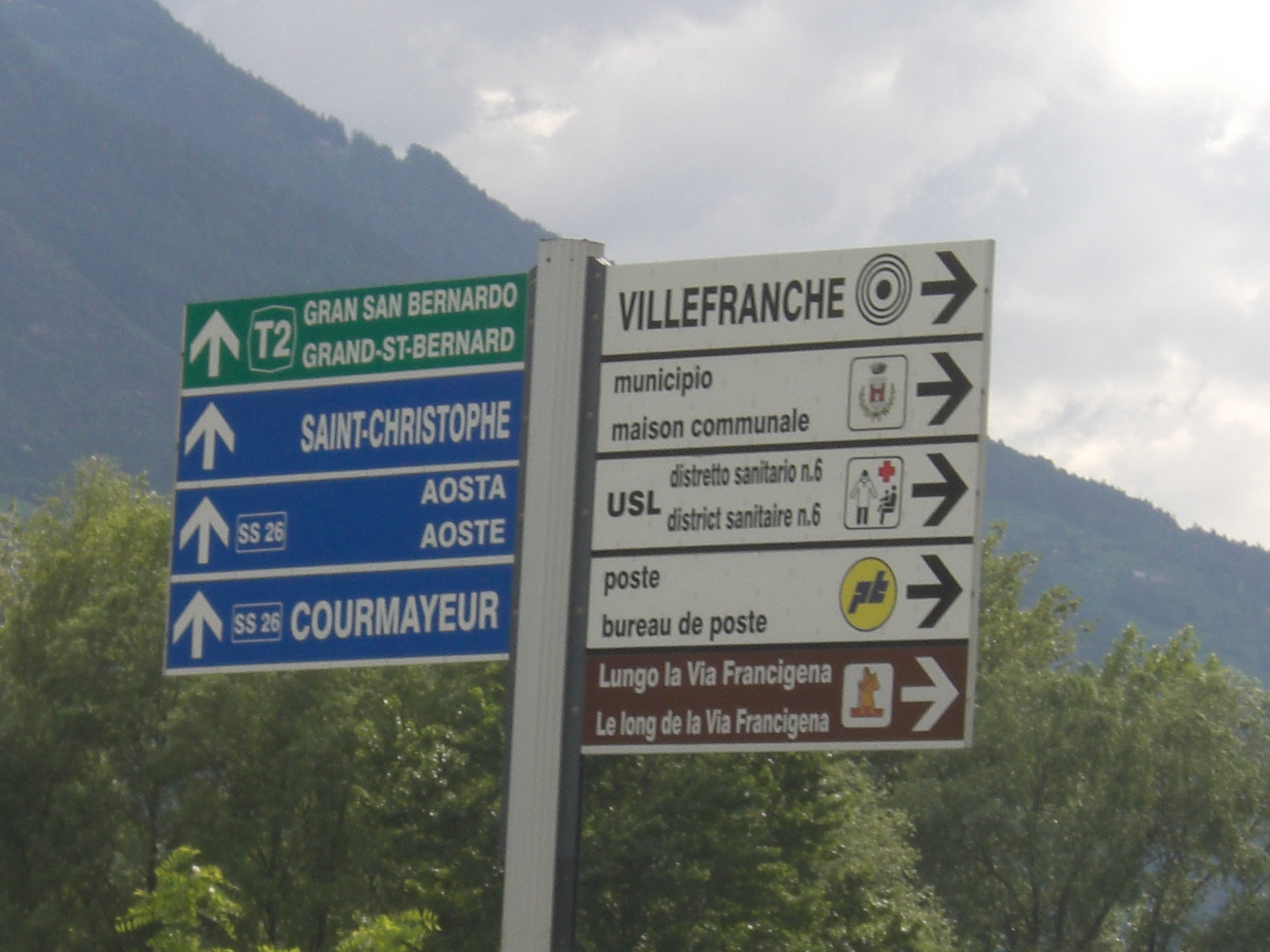
- These signs point to the Quart town hall as maison communale
- Region: Aosta Valley
- Language family: Indo-European: Italic; Latino-Faliscan; Romance; Italo-Western; Western Romance; Gallo-Romance; Oïl; French; Aostan French
- Early forms: Old Latin: Vulgar Latin; Proto-Romance; Old Gallo-Romance; Old French; Middle French
- Writing system: French alphabet

Language codes
- ISO 639-3: –
- IETF: fr-u-sd-it23

Aostan French (French: français valdôtain) is the variety of French spoken in the Aosta Valley, Italy.

== History ==
The Aosta Valley was the first government authority to adopt Modern French as a working language in 1536, three years before France itself. French has been the official language of the Aosta Valley since 1561, when it replaced Latin. In the 1861 census, the first held after the unification of Italy, 93% declared being Francophone; in 1921, the last census with a question about language found that 88% of the population was French-speaking. The forced Italianisation campaign by the Fascist government diminished the status of French in the region, including through the suppression of all French-language schools and institutions and violence against French speakers.

Today, French and Italian are the region's co-official languages and are used for the regional government's acts and laws, though Italian is much more widely spoken in everyday life, and French is mostly used by intellectuals and within cultural events. Though French was re-introduced as an official language after World War II, by 2003 just 0.99% reported speaking standard French natively. French remains widely known as a second language, but it is rarely spoken as a part of daily life. In 2001, 75.41% of the population of Aosta Valley was French-speaking, 96.01% declared to know Italian, 55.77% Arpitan, and 50.53% all of them. School education is delivered equally in both Italian and French so that everyone who went to school in Aosta Valley can speak French and Italian at least at a medium-high level.

== Influences ==
Aostan French is characterized by terms adopted from the valdôtain dialect of Franco-Provençal and sometimes from Italian. In this sense, it is quite similar to Savoyard dialect and to valaisan dialect as spoken in Valais.

=== Lexicon ===
Aostan French	Standard French
Ape (from the Piaggio Ape)	Tricycle à moteur
Après-dinée	Après-midi
Arpian	Gardien de vaches à l'alpage
Artson	Coffre
Assesseur	Adjoint du maire
Bague	Chose
Balosse	Lourdaud
Bauze	Tonneau de vin
Borne	Trou
Bottes	Chaussures
Brique	Lieu escarpé
Briquer	Casser
Cayon	Porc
Chiquet	Petit verre d'alcool
Choppe	Grève
Crotte	Cave
Chose	Fiancé(e)
Couisse	Tourmente de neige
Déroché	Tombé en ruines
Contre-nuit	Crépuscule
Envers	Left slope of Doire baltée
Flou	Odeur
Fruitier	Fromager
Gant de Paris	Préservatif
Garde-ville	Agent de police
Geline	Poule
Hivernieux	Logement de montagne
Jaser	Parler
Jouer (se)	S'amuser

Aostan French	Standard French
Jube	Veste
Junte	Administrative council
Lèze	Cheminée
Maison communale	Mairie
Mayen	Seconde maison en haute montagne
Mécouley	Gâteau
Modon	Bâton
Paquet	Ballot de foin
Patate	Pomme de terre
Pianin	Celui qui habite la plaine
Poëlle	Cuisine
Pointron	Rocher pointu
Quitter	Laisser
Rabadan	Personne de peu de valeur
Rabeilleur	Rebouteux, guérisseur traditionnel
Régent	Enseignant
Savater	Donner des coups
Solan	Plancher
Songeon	Sommet
Souper	Repas du soir
Syndic	Maire
Tabaquerie	Bureau de tabacs
Tabeillon	Notaire
Topié	Treille
Troliette	Tourteau, pain de noix
Tsapoter	Tailler le bois
Tsavon	Tête de bétail
Vagner	Semer
Verne	Aulne

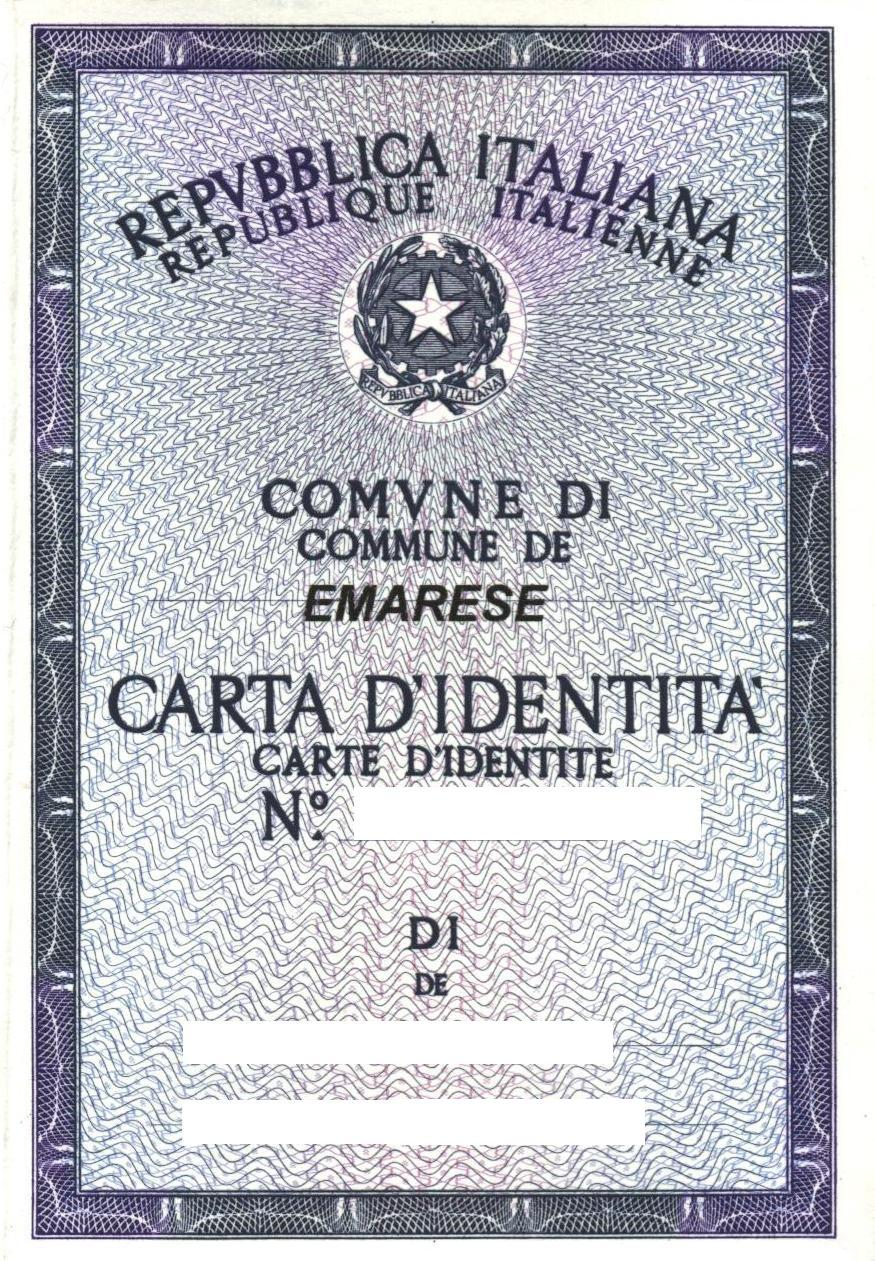
Bilingual Aostan ID.

=== Numerals ===
Unlike in the standard French of France but similar to the practice in Swiss French, Aostan French uses the words septante ([sɛp.tɑ̃t]), huitante ([ɥi.tɑ̃t]) and nonante ([nɔ.nɑ̃t]) to represent the numerals "seventy", "eighty" and "ninety" respectively.

=== Meals ===
- Breakfast = déjeuner
- Lunch = dinée or dîner
- Dinner = souper

== Bibliography ==
- (in French) Jean-Pierre Martin, Description lexicale du français parlé en Vallée d'Aoste, éd. Musumeci, Quart, 1984 (source)
- (in French) Alexis Bétemps, La langue française en Vallée d'Aoste de 1945 à nos jours T.D.L., Milan
- (in French) Jules Brocherel, Le Patois et la langue française en Vallée d'Aoste éd. V. Attinger, Neuchâtel
- (in French) La minorité linguistique valdôtaine, éd. Musumeci, Quart (1968).
- (in French) Rosellini Aldo, La francisation de la Vallée d'Aoste, dans Studi medio latini e volgari, vol. XVIII, 1958.
- (in French) Keller, Hans-Erich, Études linguistiques sur les parlers valdôtains, éd. A. Francke S.A., Berne, 1958.
- (in French) Schüle, Ernest, Histoire linguistique de la Vallée d'Aoste, dans Bulletin du Centre d'Études francoprovençales n° 22, Imprimerie Valdôtaine, Aoste, 1990.
- (in French) Favre, Saverio, Histoire linguistique de la Vallée d'Aoste, dans Espace, temps et culture en Vallée d'Aoste, Imprimerie Valdôtaine, Aoste, 1996.
- (in French) François-Gabriel Frutaz, Les origines de la langue française en Vallée d'Aoste, Imprimerie Marguerettaz, Aoste, 1913.
- (in French) Mgr. Joseph-Auguste Duc, La langue française dans la Vallée d'Aoste, Saint-Maurice, 1915.
- (in French) Anselme Réan, La phase initiale de la guerre contre la langue française dans la Vallée d'Aoste, Ivrée, 1923.
- (in French)
- (in French) Édouard Bérard, La langue française dans la Vallée d'Aoste : réponse à M. le chevalier Vegezzi-Ruscalla, Aoste, 1861 (rééd. 1962).
- (in French) Bétemps, Alexis, Les Valdôtains et leur langue, avant-propos d'Henri Armand, Imprimerie Duc, Aoste, 1979.

== See also ==
- Valdôtain dialect
