= Arch of Augustus (Aosta) =

Ancient Roman triumphal arch in Aosta, Italy

Coordinates: 45°44′21.13″N 7°19′40.91″E

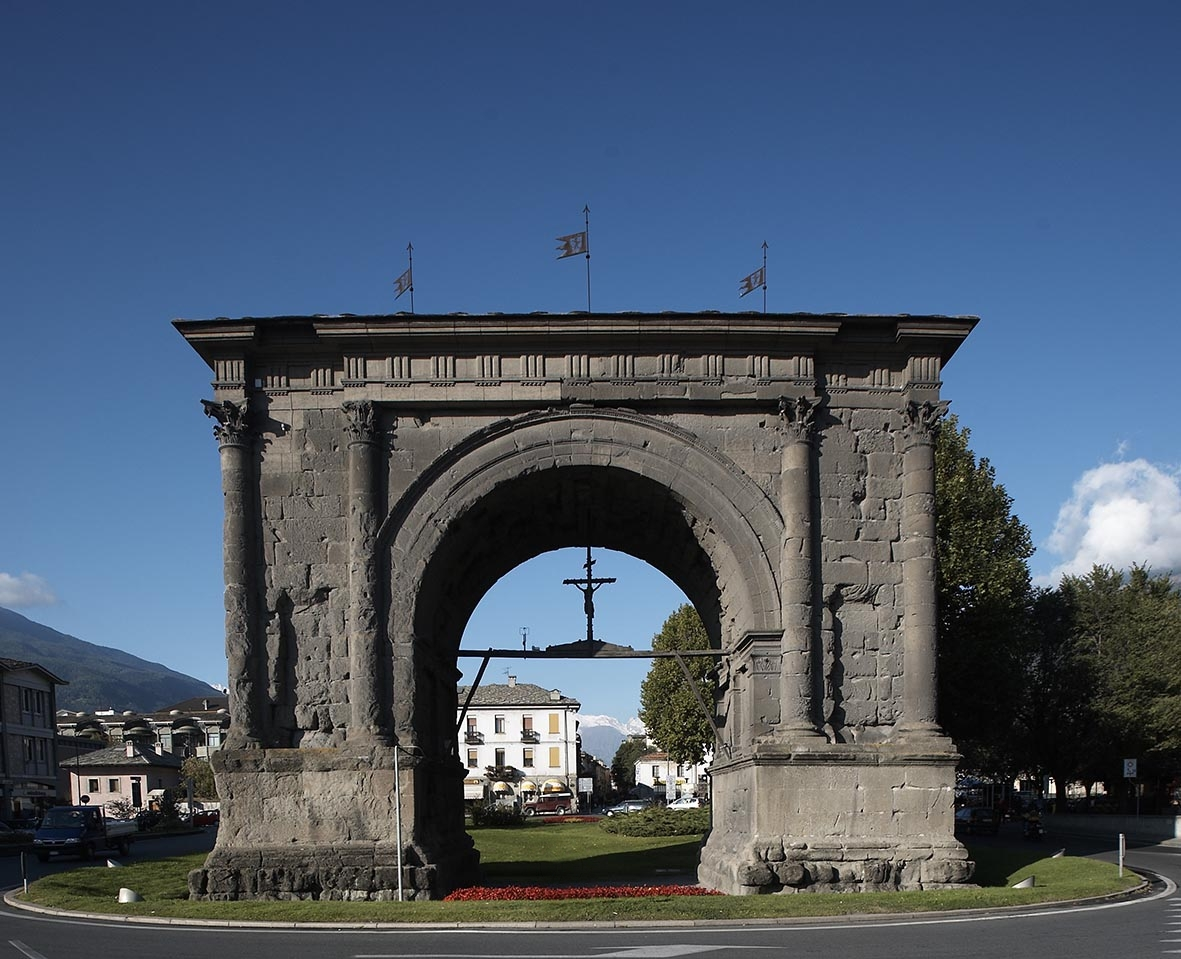
The Arch of Augustus, east facade: the four gables of the roof, shallowly inclined, are not visible.

The Arch of Augustus (in French Arc d'Auguste) is a monument in the city of Aosta, northern Italy.

It was erected in 25 BC on the occasion of the Roman victory over the Salassi and was the work of Aulus Terentius Varro Murena.

It is located at the end of the decumanus maximus, a little distance from the Bourg Saint-Ours (quarter of the Collegiate Church of Saint Ursus) and from the eastern entrance of the city wall (the Porta Prætoria).

== Description ==
Constructed from conglomerate, the arch has a single vault, with a height to the keystone of 11.4 metres (37 ft). Its span is a barrel vault, constituting an extension in width of a round arch.

In the monument, various styles can be recognised: The ten engaged columns which decorate its facade and its sides culminate in Corinthian capitals, while the entablature, adorned with metopes and triglyphs, is of the Doric order.

In the Medieval period, it came to be called the Saint-Voût (French for "Holy Arch") from an image of Jesus which was located in the same place.

During the 12th century, the arch contained the home of a local noble family and in 1318 a small fortification was built inside it, designed for a corps of crossbowmen. In 1716, because of the numerous leaks that were compromising the integrity of the monument, the attic that previously crowned the arch was replaced with a slate roof.

The arch's modern appearance is the result of a final intervention for restoration and consolidation which occurred in 1912 under the direction of Ernesto Schiaparelli.

The wooden crucifix displayed below the vault is a copy of the one which was placed there in 1449 as a votive offering against the flooding of the river Buthier, which flows a little to the east. The original crucifix is now housed in the Museum of Aosta Cathedral's Treasures.

== Quotation ==
I was so happy in contemplating these beautiful landscapes
and the triumphal arch of Aosta
that I had but one wish to make,
that this life would last forever.

— Stendhal

J'étais si heureux en contemplant ces beaux paysages
et l'arc de triomphe d'Aoste
que je n'avais qu'un vœu à former
c'était que cette vie durât toujours.

== See also ==
- Arch of Augustus (disambiguation) for other such monuments
- List of Roman triumphal arches
