= The Leper's Tower =

Tower located on the Roman wall of Aosta

Coordinates: 45.7344°N 7.3156°E

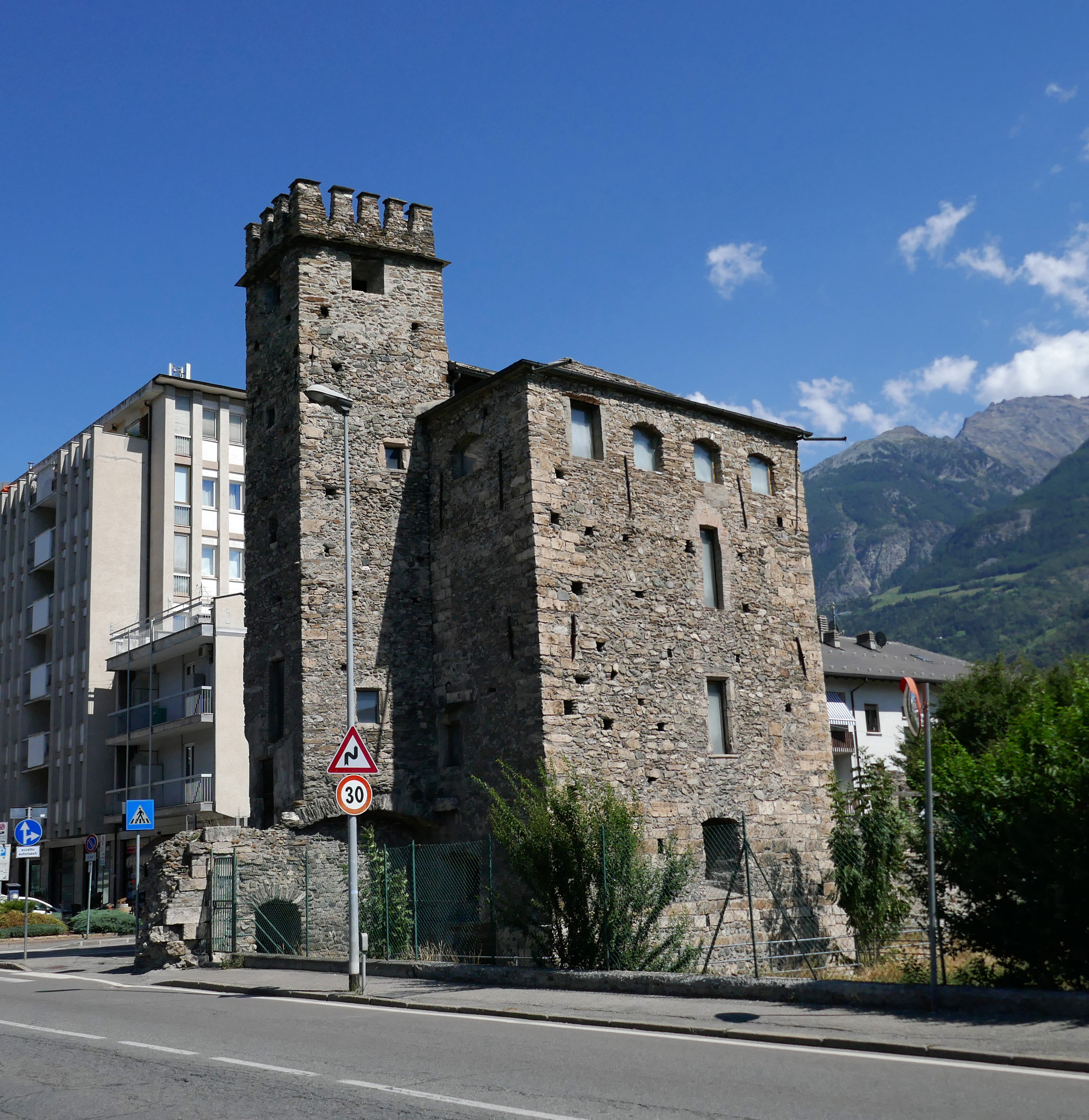

The Leper's Tower (French: Tour du lépreux) is a tower located at the north-west corner of the Roman wall of Aosta, on the rue Jean-Boniface Festaz, in Aosta, Aosta Valley, Italy.

== History ==
The Leper's Tower was built on the ruins of an ancient Roman tower and was originally known as the Friour Tower (French: Tour de Friour) after the family that lived there. This family, whose name was mentioned for the first time in 1191, also occupied the Porta Decumana, nowadays in ruins.

After several changes of ownership, it was bought by the Order of Saint-Maurice in 1773 and was incorporated into a hospice of charity founded by Jean-Boniface Festaz. The current name derives from the fact that a leper named Pierre-Bernard Guasco, originally from Oneglia, was imprisoned there from 1773 to 1803. This story inspired Le Lépreux de la Cité d'Aoste ("The Leper from Aosta"), a story written by Xavier de Maistre, published in 1811.

In 1890, the tower was restored by the Regional Monuments Office of Piedmont and Liguria, led by Alfredo d’Andrade. Today it belongs to the Autonomous Region of Aosta Valley and temporary exhibitions are held in it.

== Architecture ==
The Leper's Tower was founded on a Roman tower whose foundations were excavated in the nineteenth century. A medieval tower was built on the site in the fifteenth century.

Most of the remaining Roman windows have been walled up.

== Bibliography ==
- Zanotto, André (1978). Guide des châteaux du Val d'Aoste. Éditions Musumeci. ISBN 88-7032-039-1.
