= Collegiate church of Saint Ursus =

Church in Aosta, Italy

Coordinates: 45.7393°N 7.3253°E

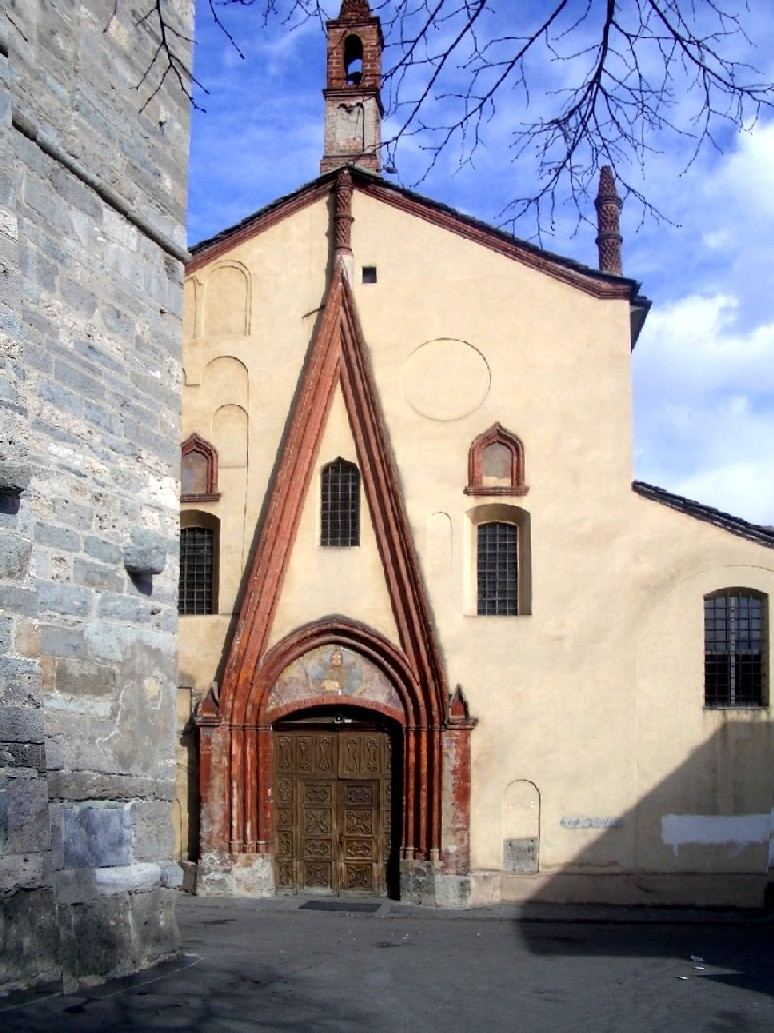
Façade of the church.

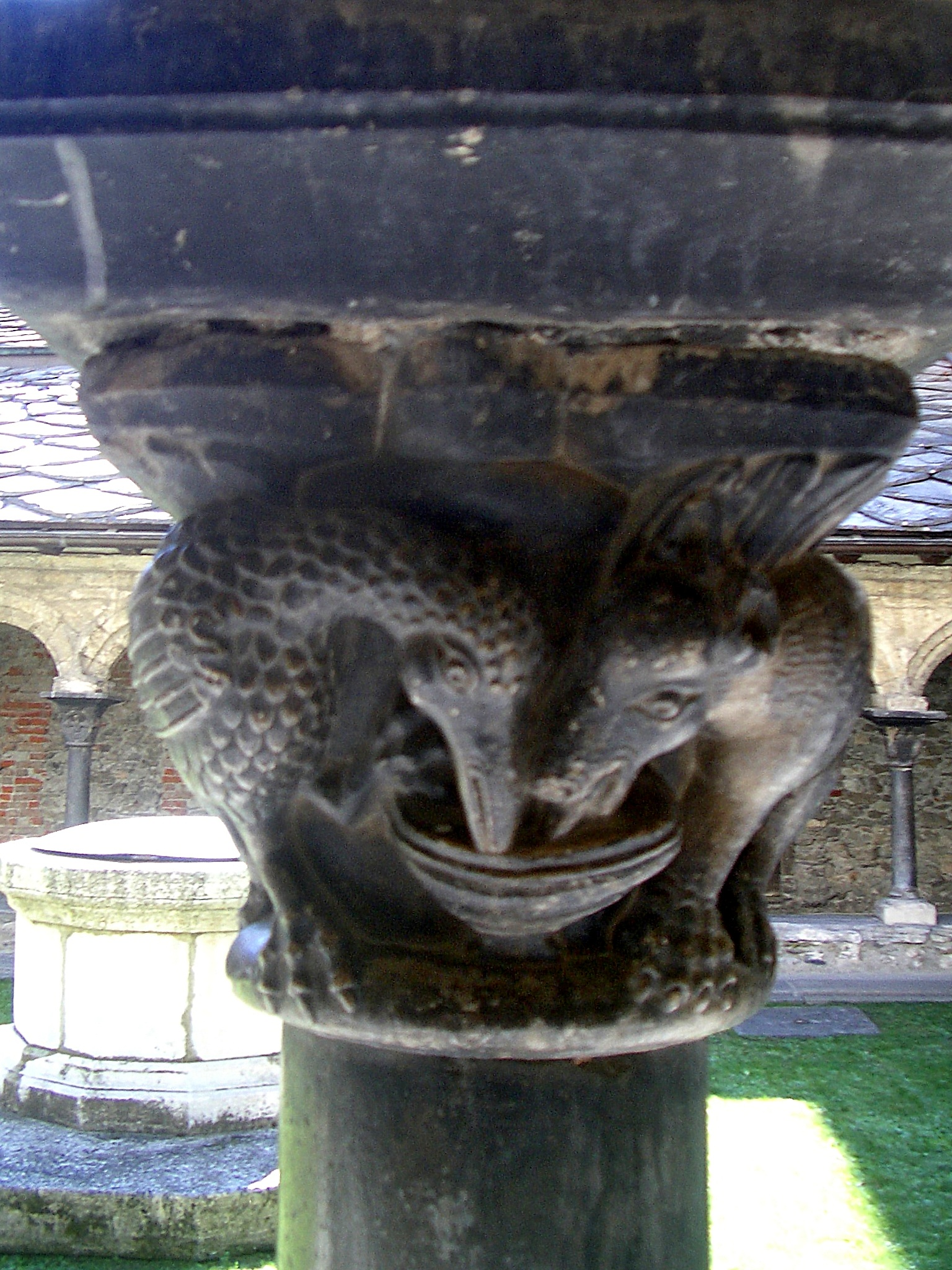
Capital of the cloister, depicting the Aesop's fable of the Fox and the Stork.

The Collegiate church of Saint Ursus (Italian: Collegiata di Sant'Orso, French: Collégiale de Saint-Ours) is a collegiate church in Aosta, northern Italy, dedicated to Saint Ursus of Aosta.

The original church had a single hall, delimited by a semicircular apse. It was entirely rebuilt during the 9th century, during the Carolingian age. Later, bishop Anselm of Aosta further renovated the church, introducing a basilica plan with three naves with wooden trusses. These were replaced by Gothic cross vaults in the 15th century.

== Description ==
The church has a nave and two aisles divided by quadrangular pillars.

The vault was rebuilt in the 15th century. Fragments of a Romanesque series of paintings are preserved in good condition in the space between the current vault and the original ceiling. These portray scenes from the New Testament as well as a martyrdom. Stylistically they resemble the bright colours and strongly marked outlines of some of the frescoes at the Galliano Basilica near Cantù. In the right aisles is a chapel housing the altar of St. Sebastian, also with frescoes (15th century).

The cloister has historiated capitals depicting the life of Ursus. 37 of the 42 original capital remains: they were originally in white marble, though now they mostly appear in dark gray color after being washed with ash paint.

The quadrangular-plan bell tower, dating to 989, has kept some of the lower 15 metres (49 ft) of the original medieval structure. The present structure, in Romanesque style, dates to the 12th century and has a total height of 44 metres (144 ft).

The church is home to numerous missals and reliquaries, including the relics of Ursus, which rest in the crypt. It also holds the relics of Saint Gratus of Aosta.
