= Votodrones =

Ancient Gallic people in Cisalpine Gaul

The Votodrones were an ancient Gallic people of Cisalpine Gaul, living near modern Somma Lombardo (Lombardy, northern Italy). They are known from a single Roman-period votive inscription, in which they appear as a community of villagers (vicani).

== Name ==
The name is recorded in a votive inscription to Hercules from Somma Lombardo, dated to the 2nd century AD:

Her[c]uli / vicani / Votodrones / v(otum) s(olverunt)

"To Hercules, the vicani Votodrones fulfilled their vow."

Xavier Delamarre analyses the name as the Gaulish compound Uoto-drones, which he interprets as 'those who dispute for their rights'. It is formed with uoto- 'right' (cf. Old Irish foth 'right, claim, what is due') attached to -drones 'dispute, combat' (cf. Old Irish drenn 'strife, dispute', Old Breton ardren and Welsh drynni 'combat').

== Geography ==
The inscription was found at Somma Lombardo, in the territory of Mediolanum (Transpadana, Regio XI), near Lake Maggiore.
