= Montunates =

Ancient people of Roman northern Italy

The Montunates were the inhabitants of an ancient vicus around modern Albizzate, in Transpadana (northern Roman Italy). They are known from a single votive inscription of the Roman period.

== Attestation ==
The vicani Montunates appear in a dedication to Jupiter Optimus Maximus found at Albizzate (Transpadana) and dated to the 1st or 2nd century AD:

I(ovi) O(ptimo) M(aximo) / Montunates vicani / Lovanius / v(otum) s(olvit) l(ibens) l(aetus) m(erito)

"To Jupiter Optimus Maximus. The Montunates villagers. Lovanius fulfilled his vow, willingly, gladly and deservedly."

The inscription names the community as a body of vicani, the inhabitants of a vicus (village), and records the offering as the act of an individual, Lovanius, who discharged a vow to the god. The dedication is addressed to Jupiter Optimus Maximus, the chief deity of the Roman state.

The name survives in Montonate, a hamlet (frazione) of Mornago.
