= Etruscan Arch =

One of the gates of the Etruscan wall of Perusian

Coordinates: 43°6′52″N 12°23′23″E

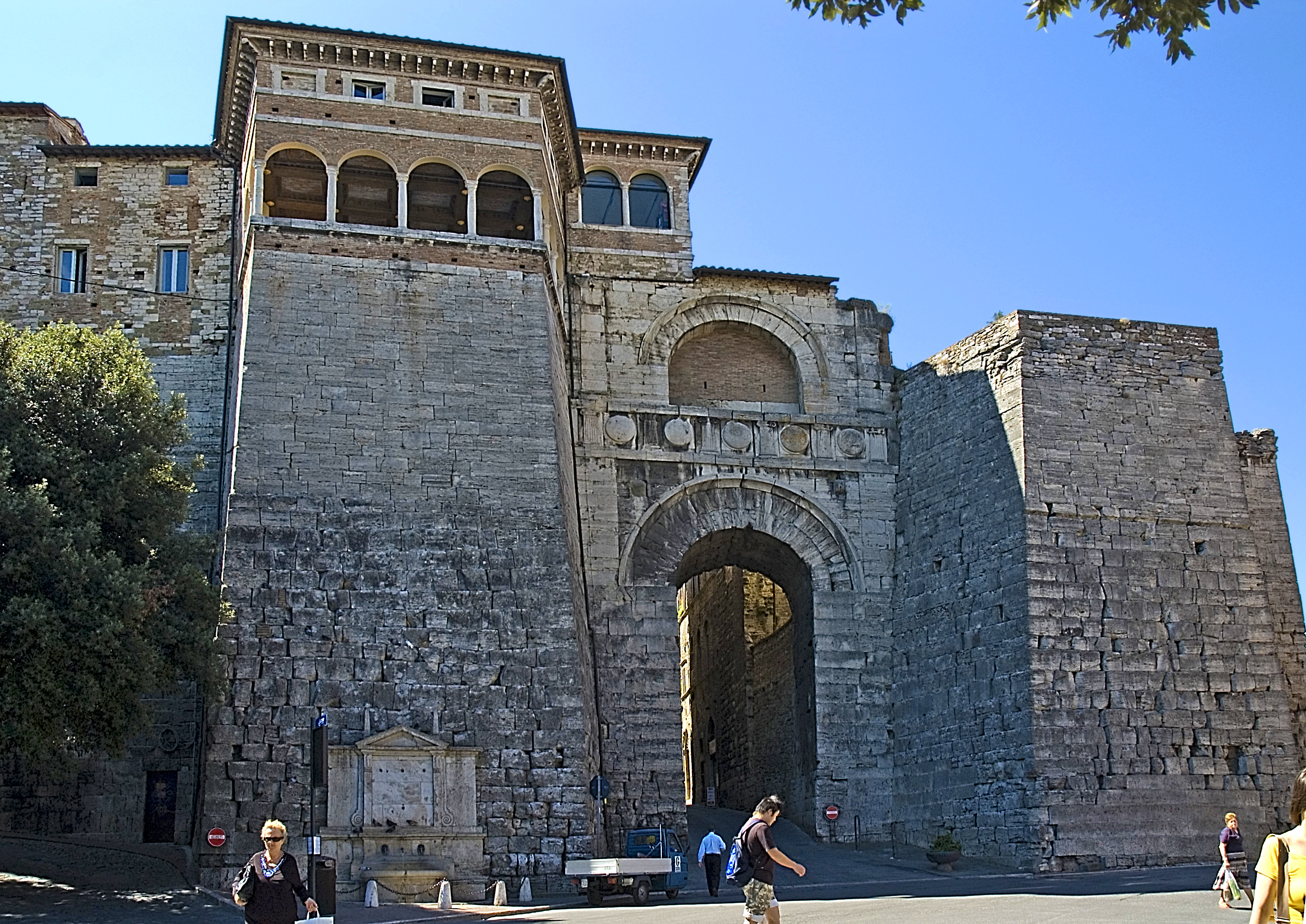
The arch seen from Piazza Grimana

The Etruscan Arch, also known as the Arch of Augustus or Augustus Gate, is one of the eight gates in the Etruscan walls of ancient Perusia, now modern-day Perugia. It is one of only two surviving gates from the original circuit, the other being the Porta Marzia to the south.

== History ==
It was constructed in the second half of the 3rd century BC and was restored by Augustus in 40 BC after his victory in the Perusine War. Representing the best surviving and most monumental of the Etruscan city gates, it opens onto the cardo maximus of the city, corresponding to the modern Ulisse Rocchi Road.

The arch is part of a massive set of walls which are 30 ft (9.1 m) tall and 9,500 ft (2,900 m) long made of travertine and set without mortar. It covers approximately a quarter of a square mile over three hills.

The arch consists of an attractive facade with a single archway and two trapezoidal towers. The archway forms a semicircular barrel vault passageway over 30 feet high. Two rows of voussoirs form the shape of the arch and are held in place by a keystone at the top. Above the arch (in two concentric rows) there is an ornate Doric-inspired frieze of metopes with round shields and triglyphs in six vertical bands. Above this is another smaller voussoir arch between two pilasters, making the height of the Etruscan Arch more than 60 feet.

On the internal face, it is possible to read the inscription Augusta Perusia, which was the name of the city after the reconstruction of 40 BC; on the external face the inscription Colonia Vibia is inscribed, testimony to the ius coloniae received from Emperor Trebonianus Gallus (251–253).

The loggia on the left tower is an addition from the 16th century, while the fountain at the bottom of the same tower was completed in 1621.

In front of the arch is Palazzo Gallenga Stuart, the seat of the University for Foreigners Perugia.

== Bibliography ==
- Castex, Jean (2008). Architecture of Italy. ABC-CLIO. ISBN 9780313350870.
- Touring Club Italiano-La Biblioteca di Repubblica (2004). L'Italia: Umbria. Touring editore.
