= Quart, Aosta Valley =

Quart Car (Valdôtain) Koart (Walser)
- Comune
- Comune di Quart; Commune de Quart
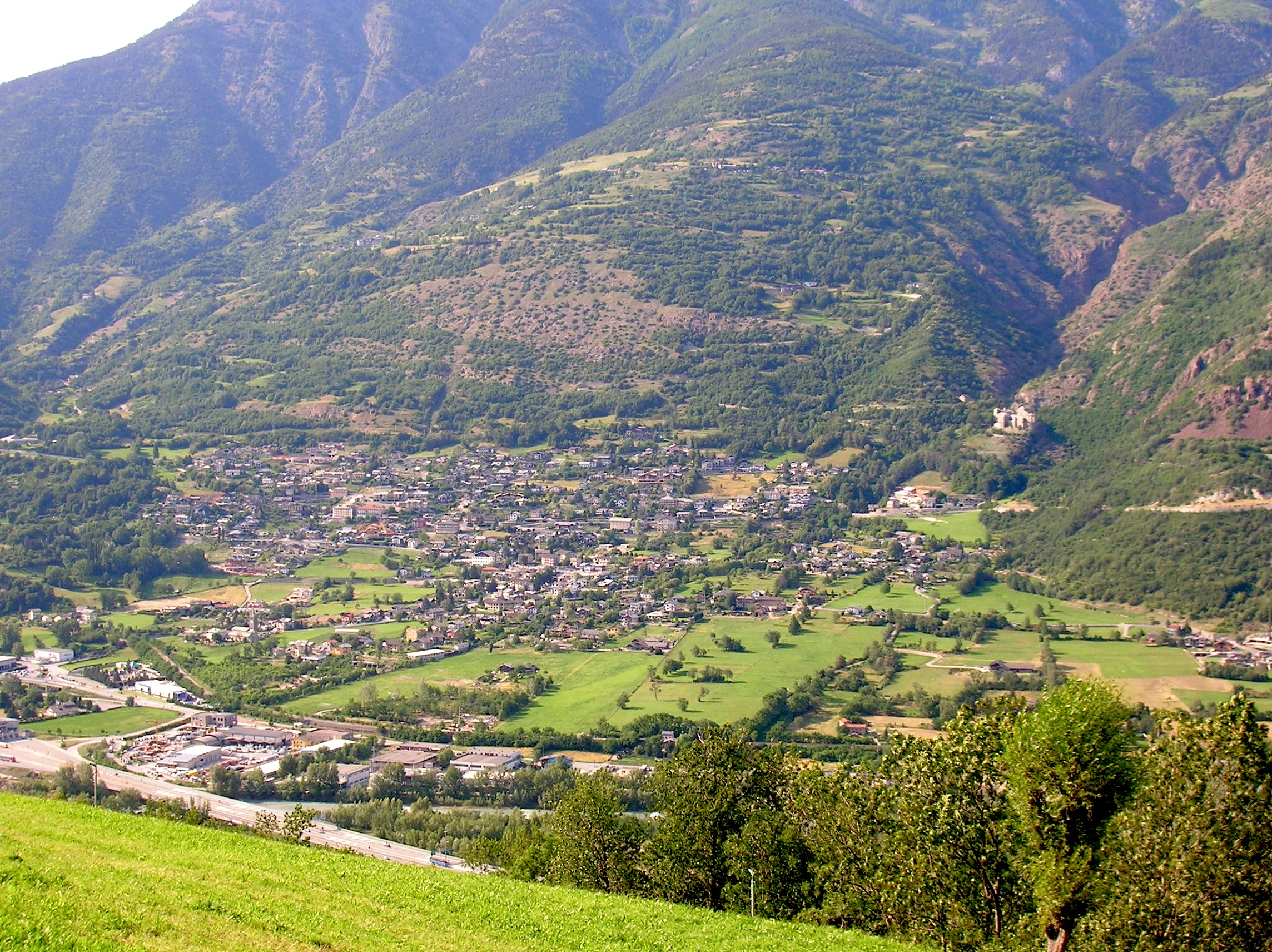

- Coat of arms

- Location within Italy Location within Aosta Valley
- Coordinates: 45°44′N 7°25′E
- Country: Italy
- Region: Aosta Valley
- Province: none
- Frazioni: Argnod, Éclou, L'Amérique, Les Cleyves, Trois-Villes, La Montagne, Villair de Quart, Villefranche, Ville-sur-Nus, Villeneuve, Champlan, Larey, Avisod, Bagnère, Chantignan, Chétoz, La Combe, Cort, Crétallaz, Créton, Effraz, Jeanceyaz, Morgonaz, Olleyes, Porsan, Seran, Teppe, Lillaz, Vignil, Povil, Vollein

Government
  - Mayor: Fabrizio Bertholin

Area
  - Total: 62 km^{2} (24 sq mi)
- Elevation: 535 m (1,755 ft)

Population (31 December 2022)
  - Total: 4,104
  - Density: 66/km^{2} (170/sq mi)
- Demonym: Quarteins
- Time zone: UTC+1 (CET)
  - Summer (DST): UTC+2 (CEST)
- Postal code: 11020
- Dialing code: 0165
- ISTAT code: 7054
- Patron saint: St. Helena
- Saint day: 2 August
- Website: Official website

Quart (French: [kaʁ]; Valdôtain: Car; Issime Walser: Koart) is a comune (municipality) in the Italian region of Aosta Valley.

== Main sights ==
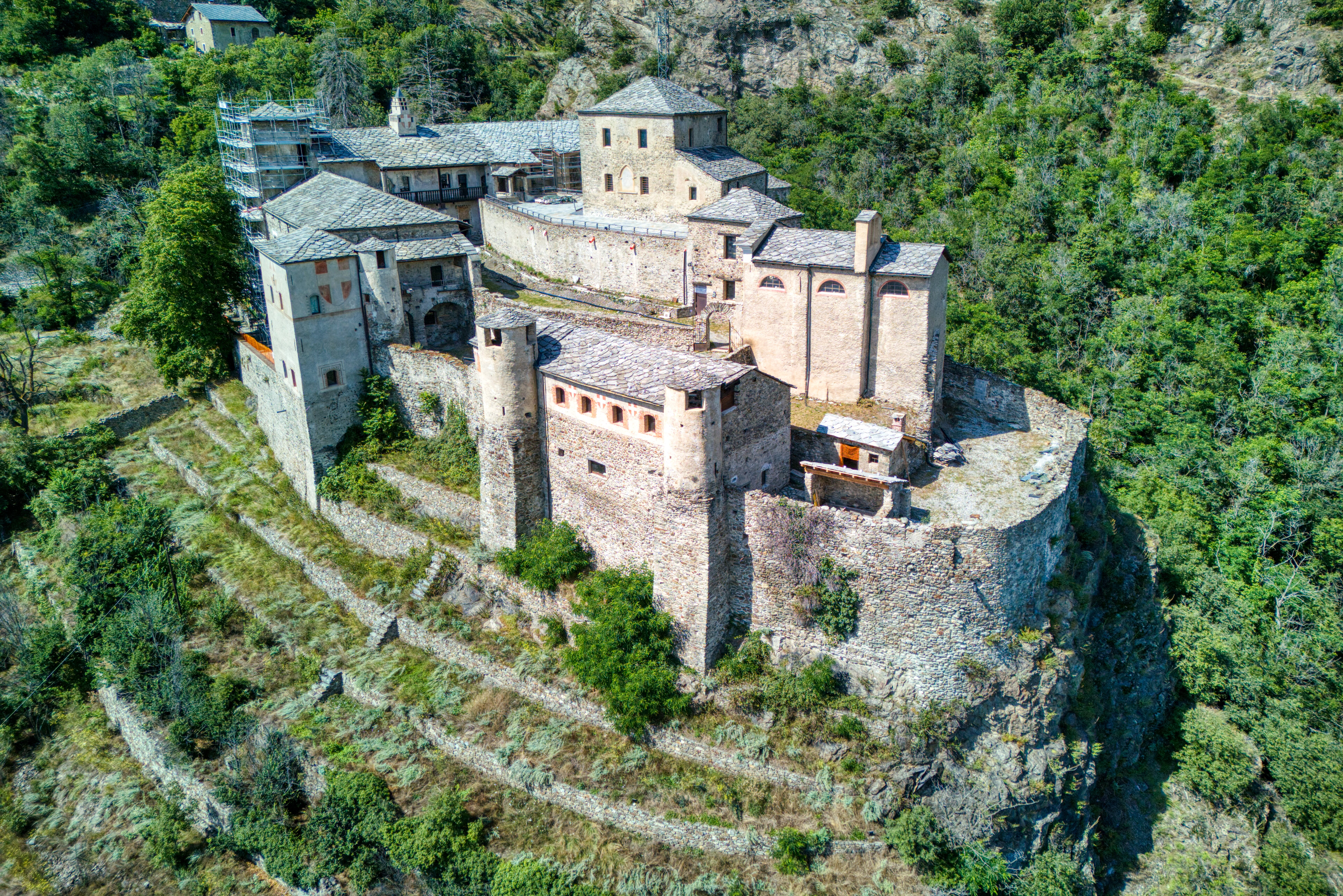
The Quart castle.

The Quart Castle, built starting from 1185 by Jacques de la Porte de Saint-Ours, founder of the Lords of Quart.

On the slopes below the castle, near Vollein, in 1968 remains of the Neolithic Vollein necropolis were found.

Other sights include a series of medieval watchtowers, such as the Chétoz Tower, the museum of Aosta Valley Railroads, and a fortified house in Povil.
