= Italian invasion of France =

Italian engagement of World War II

Italian Invasion of France
- Part of the Battle of France during World War II
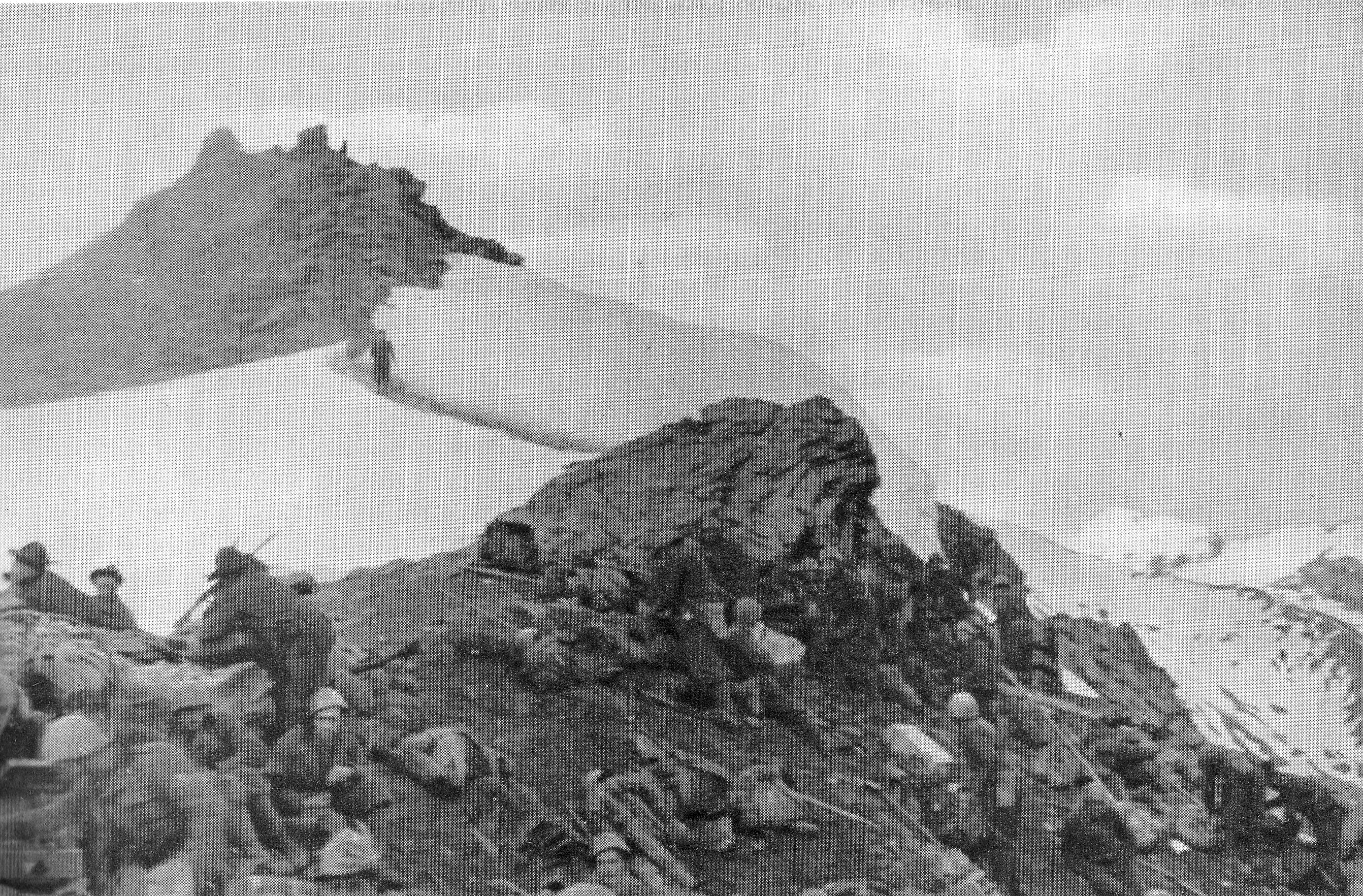
- The Val Dora battalion of the 5th Alpini Regiment in action in the Col de Pelouse
Date	10–25 June 1940
Location	Franco-Italian border
Result	Armistice of Villa Incisa
Territorial changes	Creation of the Italian occupied zone in southern France

Belligerents
France; Air support: United Kingdom (Note: A British bomber squadron, the Haddock Force, was stationed in France with the aim to bomb Italian industrial cities in case when Italy entered the war.)	Italy

Commanders and leaders
(French Third Republic) René-Henri Olry	(Kingdom of Italy) Prince Umberto (Kingdom of Italy) Alfredo Guzzoni (Kingdom of Italy) Pietro Pintor

Strength
~180,000 total (85,000 at the front)	300,000 total

Casualties and losses
Total: ~340–460: ~40 killed; ~50–120 wounded; ~150 prisoners; ~100–150 missing; 1 destroyer damaged 1 sloop damaged	Total: ~6,038: ~640 killed; 2,631 wounded; 2,151 frostbite victims; 616 missing; 1 submarine sunk 1 torpedo boat damaged

The Italian invasion of France (10–25 June 1940), also called the Battle of the Alps, (Note: This is a translation of the French term Bataille des Alpes. In Italian, it is called the Battaglia delle Alpi Occidentali, the "Battle of the Western Alps".) was the first major Italian engagement of World War II and the last major engagement of the Battle of France.

The Italian entry into the war widened its scope considerably in Africa and the Mediterranean Sea. The goal of the Italian leader, Benito Mussolini, was the elimination of Anglo-French domination in the Mediterranean, the reclamation of historically Italian territory (Italia irredenta) and the expansion of Italian influence over the Balkans and in Africa. France and Britain tried during the 1930s to draw Mussolini away from an alliance with Germany but the rapid German successes from 1938 to 1940 made Italian intervention on the German side inevitable by May 1940.

Italy declared war on France and Britain on the evening of 10 June, to take effect just after midnight. The two sides exchanged air raids on the first day of the war, but little transpired on the Alpine front since France and Italy had defensive strategies. There was some skirmishing between patrols and the French forts of the Ligne Alpine exchanged fire with their Italian counterparts of the Vallo Alpino. On 17 June, France announced that it would seek an armistice with Germany. On 21 June, with a Franco-German armistice about to be signed, the Italians launched a general offensive along the Alpine front, the main attack coming in the northern sector and a secondary advance along the coast. The Italian offensive penetrated a few kilometres into French territory against strong resistance but stalled before its primary objectives could be attained, the coastal town of Menton, situated directly on the Italian border, being the most significant conquest.

On the evening of 24 June, an armistice was signed at Rome. It came into effect just after midnight on 25 June, at the same time as the armistice with Germany (signed 22 June). Italy was allowed to occupy the territory it had captured in the brief fighting, a demilitarised zone was created on the French side of the border, Italian economic control was extended into south-east France up to the Rhône and Italy obtained certain rights and concessions in certain French colonies. An armistice control commission, the Commissione Italiana d'Armistizio con la Francia (CIAF), was set up in Turin to oversee French compliance.

== Background ==
=== Italian imperial ambitions ===
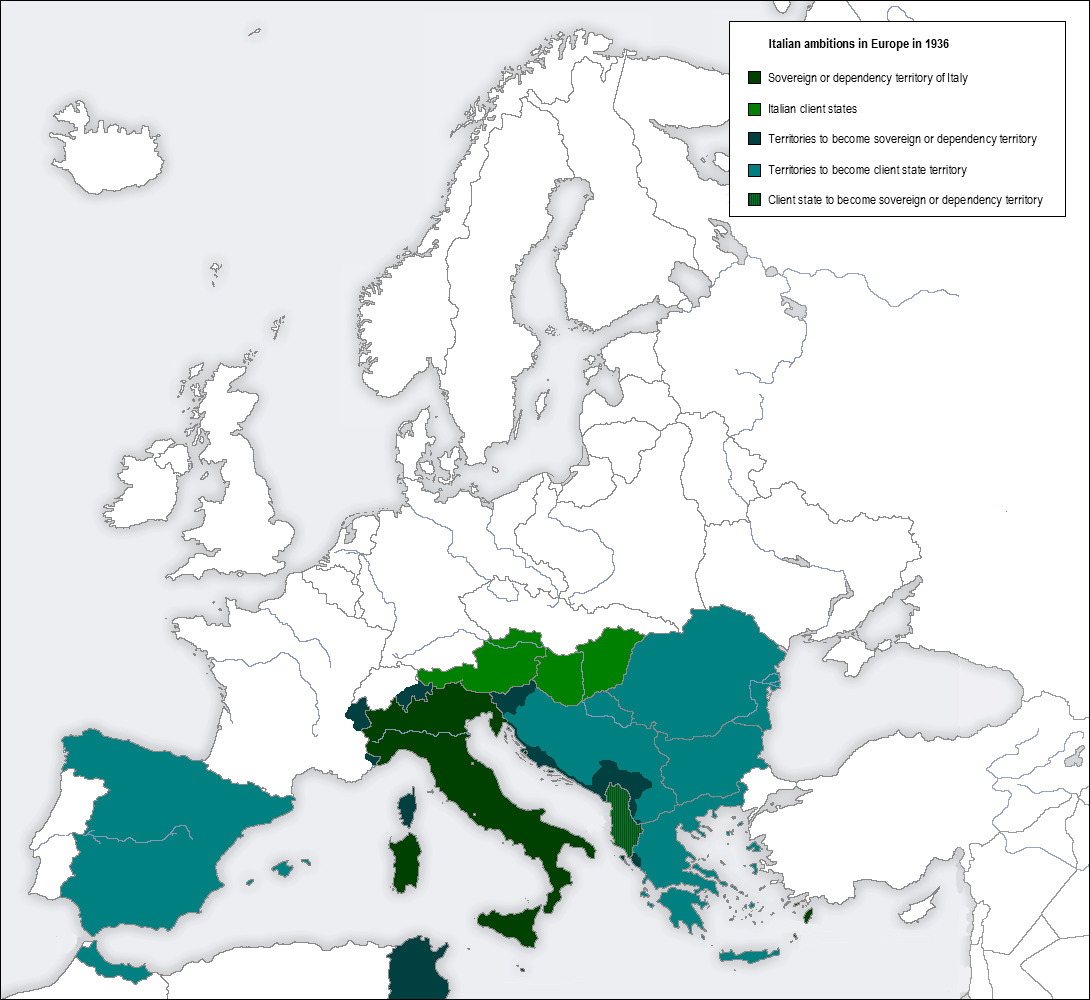
Ambitions of Fascist Italy in Europe in 1936. Legend: Metropolitan Italy and dependent territories; Client states; Claimed territories to be annexed; Territories to be transformed into client states. Albania, which was a client state, was considered a territory to be annexed.

During the late 1920s, the Italian Prime Minister Benito Mussolini spoke with increasing urgency about imperial expansion, arguing that Italy needed an outlet for its "surplus population" and that it would therefore be in the best interests of other countries to aid in this expansion. The immediate aspiration of the regime was political "hegemony in the Mediterranean–Danubian–Balkan region", more grandiosely Mussolini imagined the conquest "of an empire stretching from the Strait of Gibraltar to the Strait of Hormuz". Balkan and Mediterranean hegemony was predicated by ancient Roman dominance in the same regions. There were designs for a protectorate over Albania and for the annexation of Dalmatia, as well as economic and military control of Yugoslavia and Greece. The regime also sought to establish protective patron–client relationships with Austria, Hungary, Romania and Bulgaria, which all lay on the outside edges of its European sphere of influence. Although it was not among his publicly proclaimed aims, Mussolini wished to challenge the supremacy of Britain and France in the Mediterranean Sea, which was considered strategically vital, since the Mediterranean was Italy's only conduit to the Atlantic and Indian Oceans.

In 1935, Italy initiated the Second Italo-Ethiopian War, "a nineteenth-century colonial campaign waged out of due time". The campaign gave rise to optimistic talk on raising a native Ethiopian army "to help conquer" Anglo-Egyptian Sudan. The war also marked a shift towards a more aggressive Italian foreign policy and also "exposed [the] vulnerabilities" of the British and French. This in turn created the opportunity Mussolini needed to begin to realize his imperial goals. In 1936, the Spanish Civil War broke out. From the beginning, Italy played an important role in the conflict. Their military contribution was so vast, that it played a decisive role in the victory of the Nationalist forces led by Francisco Franco. Mussolini had engaged in "a full-scale external war" due to the insinuation of future Spanish subservience to the Italian Empire, and as a way of placing the country on a war footing and creating "a warrior culture". The aftermath of the war in Ethiopia saw a reconciliation of German-Italian relations following years of a previously strained relationship, resulting in the signing of a treaty of mutual interest in October 1936. Mussolini referred to this treaty as the creation of a Berlin-Rome Axis, which Europe would revolve around. The treaty was the result of increasing dependence on German coal following League of Nations sanctions, similar policies between the two countries over the conflict in Spain, and German sympathy towards Italy following European backlash to the Ethiopian War. The aftermath of the treaty saw the increasing ties between Italy and Germany, and Mussolini falling under Adolf Hitler's influence from which "he never escaped".

In October 1938, in the aftermath of the Munich Agreement, Italy demanded concessions from France. These included a free port at Djibouti, control of the Addis Ababa–Djibouti railway, Italian participation in the management of Suez Canal Company, some form of French-Italian condominium over French Tunisia, and the preservation of Italian culture on Corsica with no French assimilation of the people. The French refused the demands, believing the true Italian intention was the territorial acquisition of Nice, Corsica, Tunisia, and Djibouti. On 30 November 1938, Foreign Minister Galeazzo Ciano addressed the Chamber of Deputies on the "natural aspirations of the Italian people" and was met with shouts of "Nice! Corsica! Savoy! Tunisia! Djibouti! Malta!" Later that day, Mussolini addressed the Fascist Grand Council "on the subject of what he called the immediate goals of 'Fascist dynamism'." These were Albania; Tunisia; Corsica, an integral part of France; the Ticino, a canton of Switzerland; and all "French territory east of the River Var", including Nice, but not Savoy.

Beginning in 1939 Mussolini often voiced his contention that Italy required uncontested access to the world's oceans and shipping lanes to ensure its national sovereignty. On 4 February 1939, Mussolini addressed the Grand Council in a closed session. He delivered a long speech on international affairs and the goals of his foreign policy, "which bears comparison with Hitler's notorious disposition, minuted by Colonel Hossbach". He began by claiming that the freedom of a country is proportional to the strength of its navy. This was followed by "the familiar lament that Italy was a prisoner in the Mediterranean". (Note: The phrase "prisoner in the Mediterranean" had been used in parliament as early as 30 March 1925, by the naval minister Admiral Paolo Thaon di Revel. Revel was arguing for naval funding to receive priority over army funding.) He called Corsica, Tunisia, Malta, and Cyprus "the bars of this prison", and described Gibraltar and Suez as the prison guards. To break British control, her bases on Cyprus, Gibraltar, Malta, and in Egypt (controlling the Suez Canal) would have to be neutralized. On 31 March, Mussolini stated that "Italy will not truly be an independent nation so long as she has Corsica, Bizerta, Malta as the bars of her Mediterranean prison and Gibraltar and Suez as the walls." Fascist foreign policy took for granted that the democracies—Britain and France—would someday need to be faced down. Through armed conquest Italian North Africa and Italian East Africa—separated by the Anglo-Egyptian Sudan—would be linked, and the Mediterranean prison destroyed. Then, Italy would be able to march "either to the Indian Ocean through the Sudan and Abyssinia, or to the Atlantic by way of French North Africa".

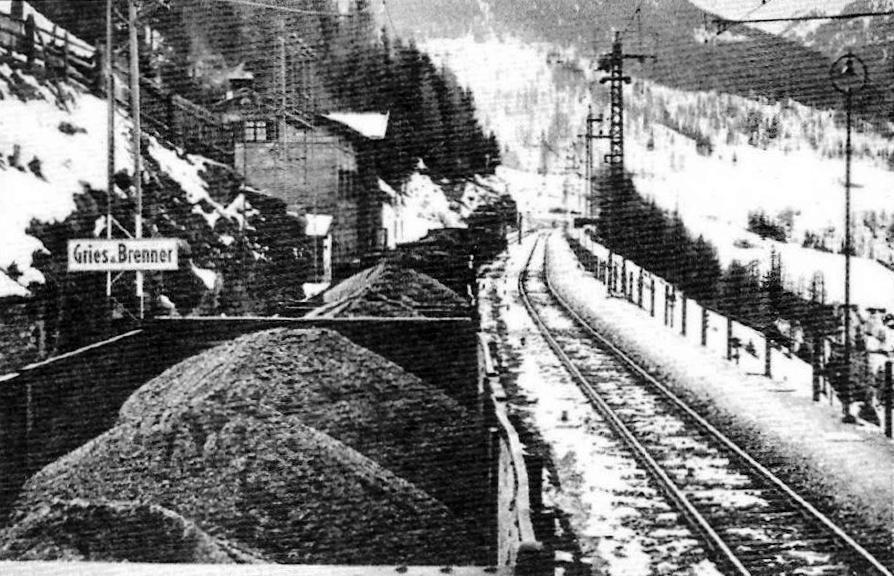
German coal entering Italy through the Brenner Pass. The issue of Italian coal was prominent in diplomatic circles in the spring of 1940.

As early as September 1938, the Italian military had drawn up plans to invade Albania. On 7 April 1939, Italian forces landed in the country and within three days had occupied the majority of the country. Albania represented a territory Italy could acquire for "'living space' to ease its overpopulation" as well as the foothold needed to launch other expansionist conflicts in the Balkans. On 22 May 1939, Italy and Germany signed the Pact of Steel joining both countries in a military alliance. The pact was the culmination of German-Italian relations from 1936 and was not defensive in nature. Rather, the pact was designed for a "joint war against France and Britain", although the Italian hierarchy held the understanding that such a war would not take place for several years. However, despite the Italian impression, the pact made no reference to such a period of peace and the Germans proceeded with their plans to invade Poland.

In September 1939, Britain imposed a selective blockade of Italy. Coal from Germany, which was shipped out of Rotterdam, was declared contraband. The Germans promised to keep up shipments by train, over the Alps, and Britain offered to supply all of Italy's needs in exchange for Italian armaments. The Italians could not agree to the latter terms without shattering their alliance with Germany. On 2 February 1940, however, Mussolini approved a draft contract with the Royal Air Force to provide 400 Caproni aircraft; yet he scrapped the deal on 8 February. The British intelligence officer, Francis Rodd, believed that Mussolini was persuaded to reverse policy by German pressure in the week of 2–8 February, a view shared by the British ambassador in Rome, Percy Loraine. On 1 March, the British announced that they would block all coal exports from Rotterdam to Italy. Italian coal was one of the most discussed issues in diplomatic circles in the spring of 1940. In April Britain began strengthening their Mediterranean Fleet to enforce the blockade. Despite French misgivings, Britain rejected concessions to Italy so as not to "create an impression of weakness". Germany supplied Italy with about one million tons of coal a month beginning in the spring of 1940, an amount that even exceeded Mussolini's demand of August 1939 that Italy receive six million tons of coal for its first twelve months of war.

=== Battle of France ===
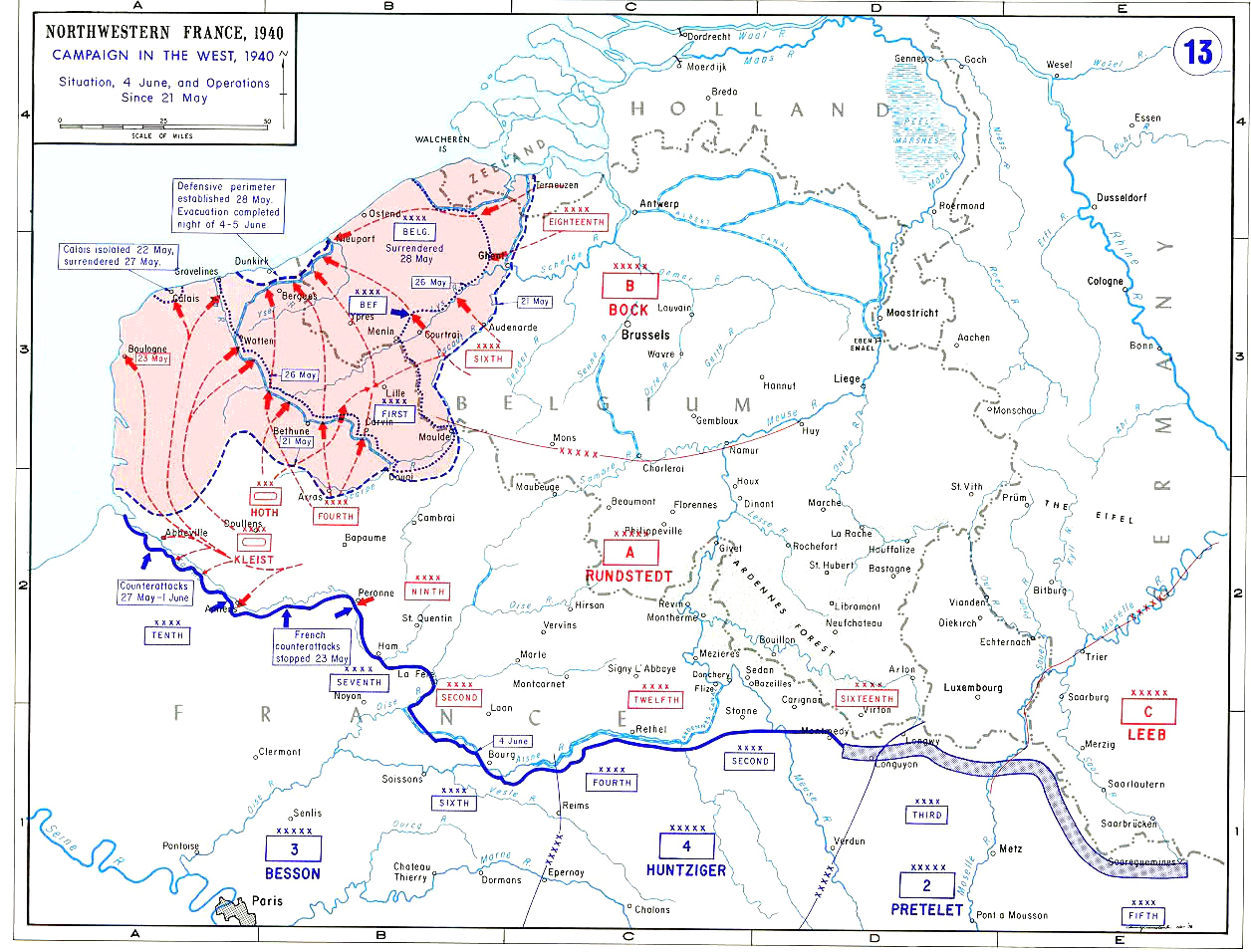
The situation on 4 June. Belgian, British, and French forces have been encircled near Dunkirk, while the remaining French armies take up positions to defend Paris.

On 1 September 1939, Germany invaded Poland. Following a month of war, Poland was defeated. A period of inaction, called the Phoney War, then followed between the Allies and Germany. On 10 May 1940, this inactivity ended as Germany began Fall Gelb (Case Yellow) against France and the neutral nations of Belgium, the Netherlands and Luxembourg. On 13 May, the Germans fought the Battle of Sedan and crossed the Meuse. The Germans rapidly encircled the northern Allied armies. On 27 May, Anglo-French forces trapped in the north began the Dunkirk evacuation, abandoning their heavy equipment in the process. Following the Dunkirk evacuation, the Germans continued their offensive towards Paris with Fall Rot (Case Red). With over 60 divisions, compared to the remaining 40 French divisions in the north, the Germans were able to breach the French defensive line along the river Somme by 6 June. Two days later, Parisians could hear distant gunfire. On 9 June, the Germans entered Rouen, in Upper Normandy. The following day, the French Government abandoned Paris, declaring it an open city, and fled to Bordeaux.

=== Italian declaration of war ===
On 23 January 1940, Mussolini remarked that "even today we could undertake and sustain a ... parallel war", having in mind a war with Yugoslavia, since on that day Ciano had met with the dissident Croat Ante Pavelić. A war with Yugoslavia was considered likely by the end of April. On 26 May, Mussolini informed Marshals Pietro Badoglio, chief of the Supreme General Staff, and Italo Balbo that he intended to join the German war against Britain and France, so to be able to sit at the peace table "when the world is to be apportioned" following an Axis victory. The two marshals unsuccessfully attempted to persuade Mussolini that this was not a wise course of action, arguing that the Italian military was unprepared, divisions were not up to strength, troops lacked equipment, the empire was equally unprepared, and the merchant fleet was scattered across the globe. (Note: Historian Paul Collier comments that up to "a third of the Italian merchant shipping fleet ... was caught without warning in neutral ports". James Sadkovich provides numbers: "212 of 786 ships over 500 GRT were caught outside the Mediterranean on 10 June 1940—a loss of 1,216,637 GRT of a total 3,318,129.") On 5 June, Mussolini told Badoglio, "I only need a few thousand dead so that I can sit at the peace conference as a man who has fought". According to the post-war memoires of Paul Paillole, in 1940 a captain in the French military intelligence, the Deuxième Bureau, he was forewarned about the Italian declaration of war on 6 June, when he met Major Navale, an Italian intelligence officer, on the Pont Saint-Louis to negotiate an exchange of captured spies. When Paillole refused Navale's proposal, the major warned him that they only had four days to work something out before war would be declared, although nothing much would happen near Menton before 19/20 June.

By mid-1940 Germany had revised its earlier preference for Italy as a war ally. The pending collapse of France might have been affected by any diversion of German military resources to support a new Alpine front. From a political and economic perspective, Italy was useful as a sympathetic neutral and her entry into the war might complicate any peace negotiations with Britain and France.

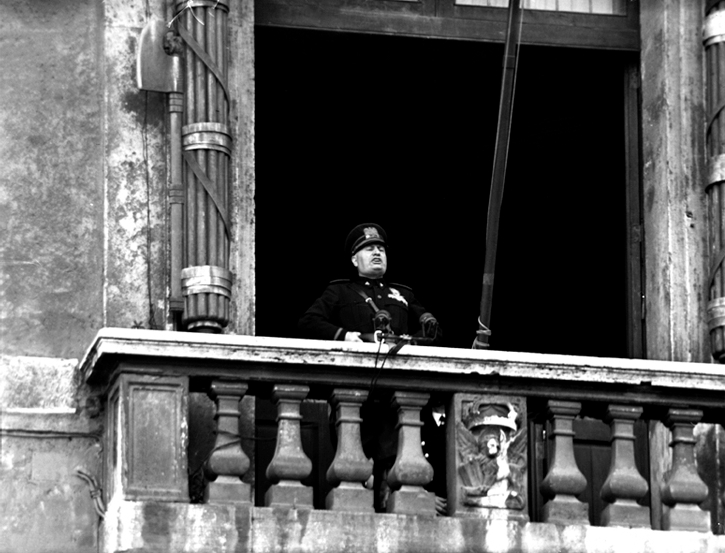
Mussolini delivering his declaration of war speech, from the balcony of the Palazzo Venezia in Rome

On 10 June, Ciano informed his ambassadors in London and Paris that a declaration of war would be handed to the British and French ambassadors in Rome at 1630 hours, local time. When Ciano presented the declaration, the French ambassador, André François-Poncet, was alarmed, while his British counterpart Percy Loraine, who received it at 1645 hours, "did not bat an eyelid", as Ciano recorded in his diary. The declaration of war took effect at midnight (UTC+01:00) on 10/11 June. Italy's other embassies were informed of the declaration shortly before midnight. Commenting on the declaration of war, François-Poncet called it "a dagger blow to man who has already fallen", and this occasioned United States President Franklin Delano Roosevelt's famous remark that "the hand that held the dagger has struck it into the back of its neighbor". François-Poncet and the French military attaché in Rome, General Henri Parisot, declared that France would not fight a "rushed war" (guerre brusquée), meaning that no offensive against Italy was being contemplated with France's dwindling military resources.

Late in the day, Mussolini addressed a crowd from the Palazzo Venezia, in Rome. He declared that he had taken the country to war to rectify maritime frontiers. Mussolini's exact reason for entering the war has been much debated, although the consensus of historians is that it was opportunistic and imperialistic. (Note: This view is also supported by historians such as Alan Cassels, MacGregor Knox, Ray Moseley, Circo Paoletti, Giorgio Rochat, Gerhard Schreiber, Brian Sullivan, and Gerhard Weinberg, as well as by contemporary Italian politicians, such as Dino Alfieri and Filippo Anfuso. Historian Denis Mack Smith partially supports this view, but argues that although Mussolini wanted to enter the war, he did not wish to participate actively. Alfieri and the Italian journalist Virginio Gayda argue that the decision to go to war was based in part on the fear of German aggression against Italy. Paoletti notes that Mussolini feared an Italo-German war following the conclusion of the fighting with the Western Powers. Thus, in order to seize his imperial ambitions Mussolini envisioned a limited war with few casualties in order to preserve his military strength for the post-war era.)

=== French response ===
On 26 May General René Olry had informed the prefect of the town of Menton, the largest on the Franco-Italian border, that the town would be evacuated at night on his order. He gave the order on 3 June and the following two nights the town was evacuated under the code name "Exécutez Mandrin". On the evening of 10/11 June, after the declaration of war, the French were ordered from their casernes to their defensive positions. French engineers destroyed the transportation and communication links across the border with Italy using fifty-three tons of explosives. For the remainder of the short war with Italy, the French took no offensive action.

As early as 14 May, the French Ministry of the Interior had given orders to arrest Italian citizens known or suspected of being anti-French in the event of war. Immediately after the declaration of war, the French authorities put up posters in all the towns near the Italian border ordering all Italian citizens to report to the local police by 15 June. Those who reported were asked to sign a declaration of loyalty that entailed possible future military service. The response was impressive: a majority of Italians reported, and almost all willingly signed the declaration. In Nice, over 5,000 Italians reported within three days.

== Forces ==
=== French ===
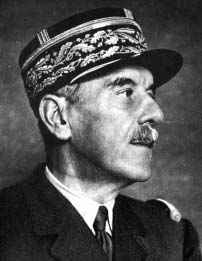
General René Olry, commander of the Army of the Alps

In June 1940, only five Alpine passes between France and Italy were practicable for motor vehicles: the Little Saint Bernard Pass, the Mont Cenis, the Col de Montgenèvre, the Maddalena Pass (Col de Larche) and the Col de Tende. The only other routes were the coast road and mule trails. Prior to September 1939, the Alpine front was defended by the Sixth Army (General Antoine Besson) with eleven divisions and 550,000 men; ample to defend a well-fortified frontier. In October the Sixth Army was reduced to the level of an army detachment (détachement d'armée), renamed the Army of the Alps (Armée des Alpes) and placed under the command of General René Olry. A plan for a "general offensive on the Alpine front" (offensive d'ensemble sur le front des Alpes), in the event of war with Italy, had been worked out in August 1938 at the insistence of Generals Gaston Billotte and Maurice Gamelin; the army was deployed for offensive operations in September 1939. Olry was ordered not to engage Italian military forces unless fired upon.

By December 1939, all mobile troops had been stripped from the Armée des Alpes, moved north to the main front against Germany, and his general staff much reduced. Olry was left with three Alpine divisions, some Alpine battalions, the Alpine fortress demibrigades, and two Alpine chasseurs demibrigades with 175,000–185,000 men. Only 85,000 men were based on the frontier: 81,000 in 46 battalions faced Italy, supported by 65 groups of artillery and 4,500 faced Switzerland, supported by three groups of artillery. Olry also had series-B reserve divisions: second-line troops, typically comprising reservists in their forties. Series-B divisions were a low priority for new equipment and the quality of training was mediocre. The Armée des Alpes had 86 sections d'éclaireurs-skieurs (SES), platoons of 35 to 40 men. These were elite troops trained and equipped for mountain warfare, skiing and mountain climbing.

On 31 May, the Anglo-French Supreme War Council came to the decision that, if Italy joined the war, aerial attacks should commence against industrial and oil-related targets in northern Italy. The RAF was promised the use of two airfields, north of Marseille as advanced bases for bombers flying from the United Kingdom. The headquarters of No. 71 Wing arrived at Marseille on 3 June as Haddock Force. It comprised Whitley and Wellington bombers from No. 10, 51, 58, 77, 102 and 149 Squadrons. The French held back part of the Armée de l'Air in case Italy entered the war, as Aerial Operations Zone of the Alps (Zone d'Opérations Aériennes des Alpes, ZOAA), with its headquarters at Valence-Chabeuil. Italian army intelligence, the Servizio Informazioni Militari (SIM), overestimated the number of aircraft still available in the Alpine and Mediterranean theatres by 10 June, when many had been withdrawn to face the German invasion; ZOAA had 70 fighters, 40 bombers and 20 reconnaissance craft, with a further 28 bombers, 38 torpedo bombers and 14 fighters with Aéronavale (naval aviation) and three fighters and 30 other aircraft on Corsica. (Note: In North Africa the French had 65 fighters and 85 bombers, and in Syria 13 bombers, 26 fighters and 46 other aircraft.) Italian air reconnaissance had put the number of French aircraft at over 2,000 and that of the British at over 620, in the Mediterranean. (Note: That includes 900 bombers and 1,160 fighters from the ZOAA, North Africa and Syria. These SIM estimates have been taken at face value by some Italian historians.) SIM also estimated the strength of the Armée des Alpes at twelve divisions, although at most it had six by June.

==== Order of battle ====
Armée des Alpes, 10 May:

Fortified Sector under the Army: General René Magnien

Defensive Sector of the Rhône

14th Corps: General Paul Beynet

Corps troops
64th Mountain Infantry Division
66th Mountain Infantry Division
Fortified Sector of Savoy
Fortified Sector of the Dauphiné

15th Corps: General Alfred Montagne

Corps troops
2nd Colonial Infantry Division
65th Mountain Infantry Division
Fortified Sector of Alpes-Maritimes

=== Fortifications ===
The Little Maginot Line 1–6: Fortified Sector of Savoy 7–12: Fortified Sector of Dauphiné 14–27: Fortified Sector of the Maritime Alps For a full list and details on the various strong points, see List of Alpine Line ouvrages.

During the 1930s, the French had constructed a series of fortifications—the Maginot Line—along their border with Germany. This line had been designed to deter a German invasion across the Franco-German border and funnel an attack into Belgium, which could then be met by the best divisions of the French Army. Thus, any future war would take place outside of French territory avoiding a repeat of the First World War.

In addition to this force, the French had constructed a series of fortifications known as Alpine Line, or the Little Maginot Line. In contrast to the Maginot Line facing the German border, the fortifications in the Alps were not a continuous chain of forts. In the Fortified Sector of the Dauphiné, several passes allowed access through the Alps between Italy and France. To defend these passes, the French had constructed nine artillery and ten infantry bunkers. (Note: The French referred to these as ouvrages, in reference to forts from the First World War, which were split into several categories. Gros ouvrages were artillery forts and petits ouvrages were infantry forts.) In the Fortified Sector of the Maritime Alps, the terrain was less rugged and presented the best possible invasion route for the Italians. In this area, 56 kilometres (35 mi) long between the coast and the more impenetrable mountains, the French constructed 13 artillery bunkers and 12 infantry forts. Along the border, in front of the above main fortifications, numerous blockhouses and casemates had been constructed. However, by the outbreak of the war some of the Little Maginot Line's positions had yet to be completed and overall the fortifications were smaller and weaker than those in the main Maginot Line.

Italy had a series of fortifications along its entire land border: the Alpine Wall (Vallo Alpino). By 1939 the section facing France, the Occidental Front, had 460 complete opere (works, like French ouvrages) with 133 artillery pieces. As Mussolini prepared to enter the war, construction work continued round the clock on the entire wall, including the section fronting Germany. The Alpine Wall was garrisoned by the Guardia alla Frontiera (GAF), and the Occidental Front was divided into ten sectors and one autonomous subsector. When Italy entered the war, sectors I and V were placed under the command of XV Army Corps, sectors II, III and IV under II Army Corps and sectors VI, VII, VIII, IX and X under I Army Corps.

=== Italian ===
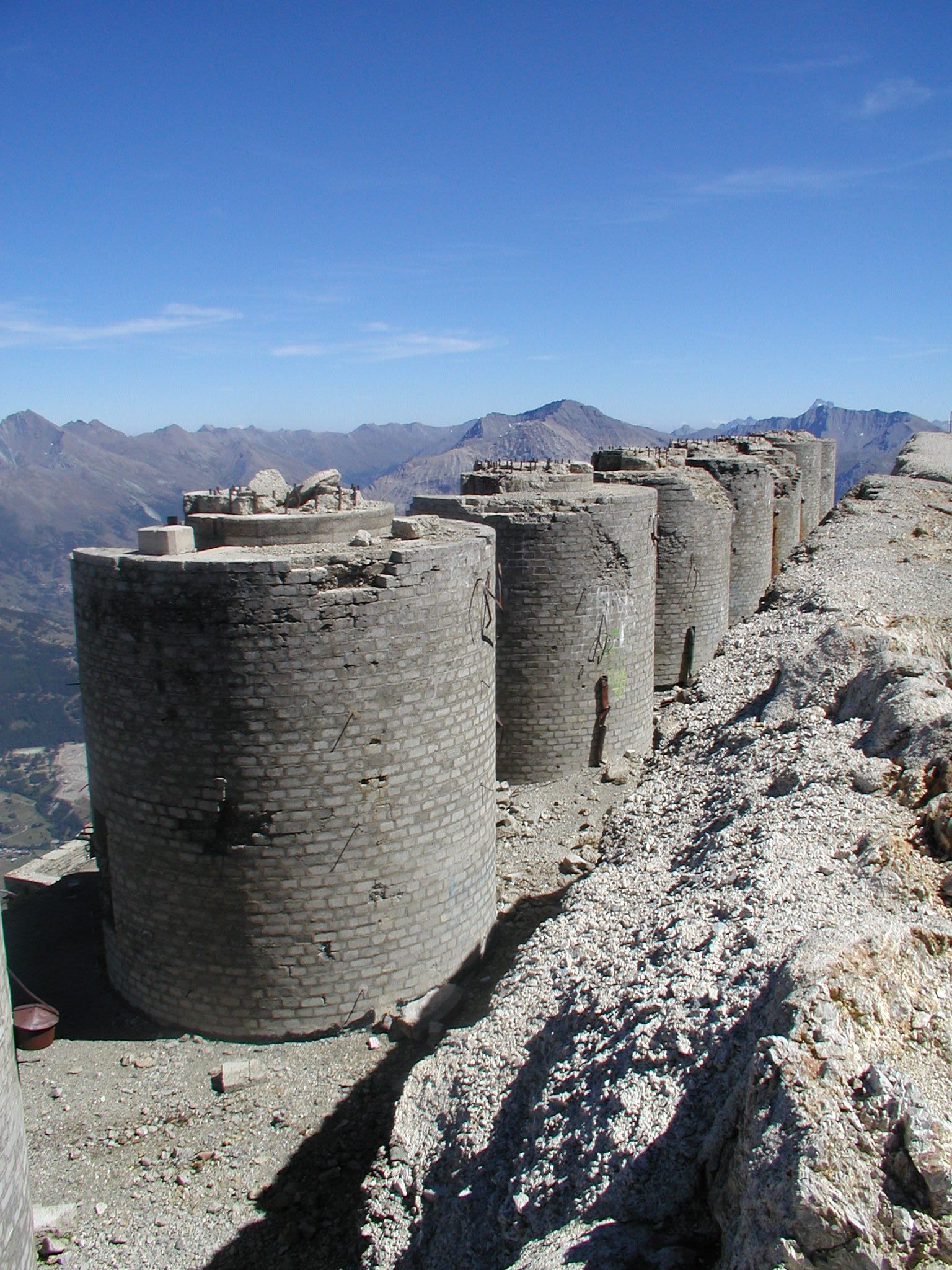
Several of the destroyed Italian artillery turrets of Fort Chaberton.

During the interwar years and 1939, the strength of the Italian military had dramatically fluctuated due to waves of mobilization and demobilization. By the time Italy entered the war, over 1.5 million men had been mobilized. The Royal Italian Army had formed 73 divisions out of this influx of men. However, only 19 of these divisions were complete and fully combat-ready. A further 32 were in various stages of being formed and could be used for combat if needed, while the rest were not ready for battle.

Italy was prepared, in the event of war, for a defensive stance on both the Italian and Yugoslav fronts, for defence against French aggression and for an offensive against Yugoslavia while France remained neutral. There was no planning for an offensive against France beyond mobilisation. On the French border, 300,000 men—in 18 infantry and four alpine divisions—were massed. These were deployed defensively, mainly at the entrance to the valleys and with their artillery arranged to hit targets inside the border in the event of an invasion. They were not prepared to assault French fortifications, and their deployment did not change prior to June 1940. These troops formed the 1st and 4th armies, which were under the command of the Italian Crown Prince Umberto of Savoy of Army Group West (Gruppo Armate Ovest). The chief of staff of Army Group West was General Emilio Battisti. The 7th Army was held in reserve at Turin, and a further ten mobile divisions, the Army of the Po (later Sixth Army), were made available. (Note: The Army of the Po—formed in November 1938 under General Ettore Bastico—was composed one corps of two armoured divisions (equipped with L/3 tankettes) and two motorised divisions in the Armoured Army Corps (Corpo d'armata corazzato), and a second corps of three fast (celeri) divisions (consisting of cavalry regiments and Bersaglieri mounted on bicycles and motorbikes) and three autotrasportabili (auto-transportable) divisions (equipped with mobile artillery and support units).) However, most of these latter divisions were still in the process of mobilizing and not yet ready for battle. Supporting Army Group West was 3,000 pieces of artillery and two independent armoured regiments. After the campaign opened, further tank support was provided by the 133rd Armoured Division Littorio bringing the total number of tanks deployed to around 200. The Littorio had received seventy of the new type M11/39 medium tanks shortly before the declaration of war.

Despite the numerical superiority, the Italian military was plagued by numerous issues. During the 1930s, the army had developed an operational doctrine of rapid mobile advances backed by heavy artillery support. Starting in 1938, General Alberto Pariani (Note: Pariani was both under-secretary of war and army chief of staff prior to his retirement in October 1939.) initiated a series of reforms that radically altered the army. By 1940, all Italian divisions had been converted from triangular divisions into binary divisions. Rather than having three infantry regiments, the divisions were composed of two, bringing their total strength to around 7,000 men and therefore smaller than their French counterparts. The number of artillery guns of the divisional artillery regiment had also been reduced. Pariani's reforms also promoted frontal assaults to the exclusion of other doctrines. Further, army front commanders were forbidden to communicate directly with their aeronautical and naval counterparts, rendering inter-service cooperation almost impossible.

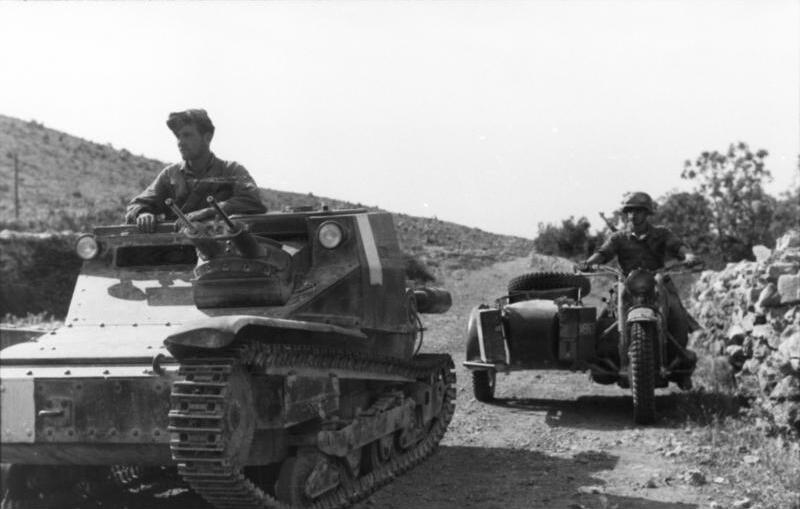
An Italian L3/35, as used during the invasion of France. This photo depicts an Italian tank and German motorbike rider during the invasion of Yugoslavia (1941).

Marshal Rodolfo Graziani had complained that due to the lack of motor vehicles, the Italian army would be unable to undertake mobile warfare as had been envisaged let alone on the levels the German military was demonstrating. The issues also extended to the equipment used. Overall, the Italian troops were poorly equipped and such equipment was inferior to that in use by the French. After the invasion had begun, a circular advised that troops were to be billeted in private homes where possible because of a shortage of tent flies. The vast majority of Italy's tanks were L3/35 tankettes, mounting only a machine gun and protected by light armour unable to prevent machine gun rounds from penetrating. They were obsolete by 1940, and have been described by Italian historians as "useless". According to one study, 70% of engine failure was due to inadequate driver training. The same issue extended to the artillery arm. Only 246 pieces, out of the army's entire arsenal of 7,970 guns, were modern. The rest were up to forty years old and included many taken as reparations, in 1918, from the Austro-Hungarian Army.

The Regia Aeronautica (Italian Air Force) had the third largest fleet of bombers in the world when it entered the war. A potent symbol of Fascist modernisation, it was the most prestigious of Italy's service branches, as well as the most recently battle-hardened, having participated in the Spanish Civil War. The 1^{a} Squadra Aerea in northern Italy, the most powerful and well-equipped of Italy's squadre aeree, (Note: Italy had four geographical squadre aeree (aerial squads) and one zona aerea (aerial zone) covering the peninsula and Sicily. Each squadra aerea was composed of stormi (singular stormo, "flock"), composed of gruppi (singular gruppo, "group") of two squadriglie (singular squadriglia). Each stormo typically operated one type of aircraft.) was responsible for supporting operations on the Alpine front. Italian aerial defences were weak. As early as August 1939 Italy had requested from Germany 150 batteries of 88-mm anti-aircraft (AA) guns. The request was renewed in March 1940, but declined on 8 June. On 13 June, Mussolini offered to send one Italian armoured division to serve on the German front in France in exchange for 50 AA batteries. The offer was refused.

On 29 May, Mussolini convinced King Victor Emmanuel III, who was constitutionally the supreme commander of the Italian armed forces, to delegate his authority to Mussolini and on 4 June Badoglio was already referring to him as supreme commander. On 11 June the king issued a proclamation to all troops, naming Mussolini "supreme commander of the armed forces operating on all fronts". This was a mere proclamation and not a royal decree and lacked legal force. Technically, it also restricted Mussolini's command to forces in combat but this distinction was unworkable. On 4 June, Mussolini issued a charter sketching out a new responsibility for the Supreme General Staff (Stato Maggiore Generale, or Stamage for short): to transform his strategic directives into actual orders for the service chiefs. On 7 June Superesercito (the Italian army supreme command) ordered Army Group West to maintain "absolute defensive behaviour both on land and [in the] air", casting in doubt Mussolini's comment to Badoglio about a few thousand dead. Two days later, the army general staff (Stato Maggiore del Regio Esercito) ordered the army group to strengthen its anti-tank defences. No attack was planned or ordered for the following day when the declaration of war would be issued.

==== Order of battle ====
Army Group West:

- 1st Army, General Pietro Pintor (Chief of Staff: General Fernando Gelich)
  - II Army Corps, General Francesco Bettini
    - 4th Alpine Division "Cuneense"
    - 4th Infantry Division "Livorno"
    - 33rd Infantry Division "Acqui"
    - 36th Infantry Division "Forlì"
  - III Army Corps, General Mario Arisio
    - 3rd Infantry Division "Ravenna"
    - 6th Infantry Division "Cuneo"
    - 1st Alpine Group (three Alpini battalions and two mountain artillery groups)
  - XV Army Corps, General Gastone Gambara (recalled from his ambassadorial post in Madrid on 10 May)
    - 5th Infantry Division "Cosseria"
    - 37th Infantry Division "Modena"
    - 44th Infantry Division "Cremona"
    - 2nd Alpine Group (four Alpini battalions, one Blackshirt battalion, two mountain artillery groups)
  - Army Reserve
    - 7th Infantry Division "Lupi di Toscana"
    - 16th Infantry Division "Pistoia"
    - 22nd Infantry Division "Cacciatori delle Alpi"
    - 5th Alpine Division "Pusteria"
    - 1st Bersaglieri Regiment
    - 3rd Tank Infantry Regiment
    - Regiment "Cavalleggeri di Monferrato"
- 4th Army, General Alfredo Guzzoni (Chief of Staff: General Mario Soldarelli)
  - I Army Corps, General Carlo Vecchiarelli
    - 1st Infantry Division "Superga"
    - 24th Infantry Division "Pinerolo"
    - 59th Infantry Division "Cagliari"
  - IV Army Corps, General Camillo Mercalli
    - 2nd Infantry Division "Sforzesca"
    - 26th Infantry Division "Assietta"
  - Alpine Army Corps, General Luigi Negri
    - 1st Alpine Division "Taurinense"
    - 3rd Alpini Regiment
    - Autonomous Group "Levanna" (three Alpini battalions, and one mountain artillery group)
  - Army Reserve
    - 2nd Alpine Division "Tridentina"
    - 11th Infantry Division "Brennero"
    - 58th Infantry Division "Legnano"
    - 1st Tank Infantry Regiment
    - Regiment "Nizza Cavalleria"
    - 4th Bersaglieri Regiment

== Battle ==
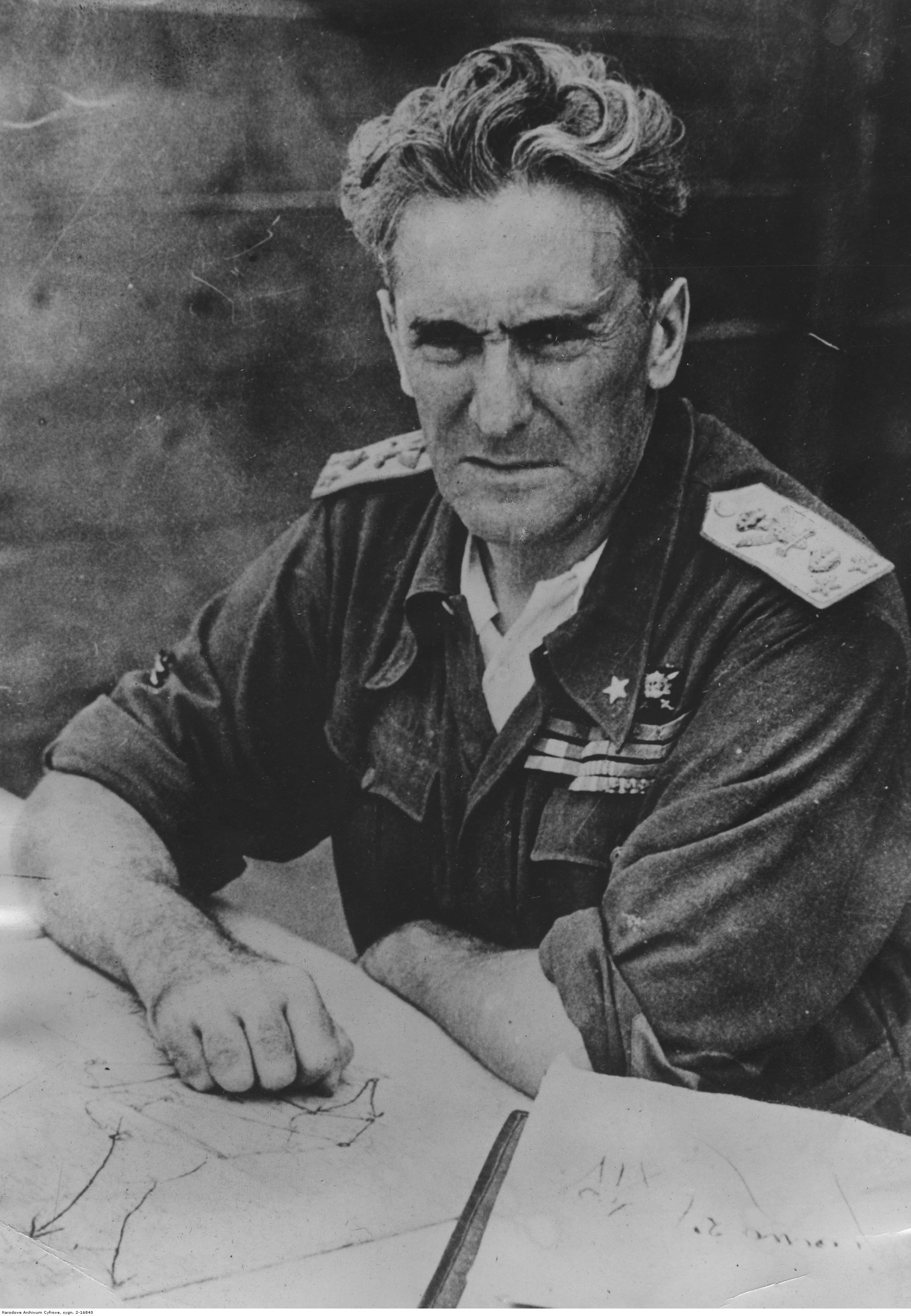
Marshal Graziani, chief of staff of the Regio Esercito and de facto front commander in the Alps

Marshal Graziani, as army chief of staff, went to the front to take over the general direction of the war after 10 June. He was joined by the under-secretary of war, General Ubaldo Soddu, who had no operational command, but who served as Mussolini's connection to the front and was appointed deputy chief of the Supreme General Staff on 13 June. (Note: Mussolini was both Prime Minister and Minister of War.) Graziani's adjutant, General Mario Roatta, remained in Rome to transmit the orders of Mussolini—restrained somewhat by Marshal Badoglio—to the front. Many of Roatta's orders, like "be on the heels of the enemy; audacious; daring; rushing after", were quickly contradicted by Graziani. Graziani kept all the minutes of his staff meeting during June 1940, in order to absolve himself and condemn both subordinates and superiors should the offensive fail, as he expected it would.

=== Air campaign ===
In the first air raids of Italy's war, Savoia-Marchetti SM.79s from the 2^{a} Squadra Aerea (Sicily and Pantelleria) under fighter escort twice struck Malta on 11 June, beginning the siege of Malta that lasted until November 1942. The first strike that morning involved 55 bombers, but Malta's anti-aircraft defences reported an attack of between five and twenty aircraft, suggesting that most bombers failed to find their target. The afternoon strike involved 38 aircraft. On 12 June some SM.79s from Sardinia attacked French targets in northern Tunisia and, on 13 June 33 SM.79s of the 2^{a} Squadra Aerea bombed the Tunisian aerodromes. That day Fiat BR.20s and CR.42s of the 1^{a} Squadra Aerea in northern Italy made the first attacks on metropolitan France, bombing the airfields of the ZOAA, while the 3^{a} Squadra Aerea in central Italy targeted shipping of France's Mediterranean coast.

Immediately after the declaration of war, Haddock Force began to prepare for a bombing run. The French, in order to prevent retaliatory Italian raids, blocked the runways and prevented the Wellingtons from taking off. This did not deter the British. On the night of 11 June, 36 RAF Whitleys took off from bases in Yorkshire in order to bomb targets in Turin, the industrial heart of Italy. The bombers refuelled in the Channel Islands, before proceeding. Most were forced to divert over the Alps because of icing conditions and turbulence. During the early hours of 12 June, ten bombers reached Turin, and a further two bombed Genoa. The Italians failed to detect the raid until it was over. The aerodrome at Caselle misidentified the bombers as their own aircraft from Udine and lit up the landing strip for them. At Turin, the air raid alarm was not raised until the unmolested Whitleys had left. The results of the action were unimpressive: fifteen civilians killed and no industrial targets damaged.

On 15 June, the French finally permitted Haddock Force to operate. During the evening, eight Wellingtons took off to attack industrial targets in Genoa. Due to thunderstorms and problems locating their target, only one aircraft attacked the city during the early hours of the next day while the remainder returned to base. On the night of 16/17 June, Haddock Force made their final sorties. Nine Wellington bombers took off to bomb targets in Italy, although only five managed to find their objectives. Following which, due to the deteriorating situation in France, the 950 men of Haddock Force were withdrawn by ship from Marseille; their equipment and stores were abandoned. British bombers reportedly dropped leaflets over Rome saying:

"France has nothing against you. Drop your arms and France will do the same."

"Women of Italy! Your sons and husbands and sweethearts have not left you to defend their country. They suffer death to satisfy the pride of one man."

"Victorious or defeated you will have hunger, misery and slavery."

From bases in French North Africa, the Armée de l'Air bombed Cagliari, Trapani (22 June) and Palermo (23 June). Twenty civilians were killed at Trapani and 25 at Palermo; these were the most severe French bombings of Italian soil. These sites were strategically irrelevant and many of the bombers had recently been withdrawn from France in the face of the German advance. Over 600 aircraft had been assembled in French North Africa by 22 June, when General Charles Noguès, commander of French forces in that theatre, requested permission to undertake offensive operations against Italy or Libya and was initially refused.

On 15 June, the 3^{a} Squadra Aerea sent some SM.79s and G.50s to bomb Corsica and, on 16 June, some Breda Ba.88s to strafe the airfields there. The most intense air-to-air combat of the campaign took place over southern France on 15 June, when Italian BR.20s and CR.42 engaged French D.520s and MB.151s. A BR.20 and several CR.42s were lost, and some French aircraft were downed. On 17 June, the Italians bombed the centre of Marseille, killing 143 and wounding 136. On 21 June they bombed the port in a daylight raid and a subsequent night raid. Aerial combats also occurred over Tunisia, with each side claiming kills. On 17 June, some CANT Z.506B floatplanes of the 4^{a} Zona Aerea in southeastern Italy joined some SM.79s in bombing Bizerte in Tunisia. The last Italian aerial operations against France were undertaken on 19 June by aircraft of the 2^{a} and 3^{a} Squadre Aeree and Sardinia against targets in Corsica and Tunisia. On 21 June, nine Italian bombers attacked the French destroyer Le Malin, but scored no hits. On the night of 22/23 June, twelve Savoia-Marchetti SM.81s out of Rhodes made the first bombing run against the British naval base in Alexandria. One bomber ran out of fuel and was forced to ditch on the return leg.

Italian aircraft roundels

Tricolour roundel
(to 1936)

Fascist wing roundel
(from 1936)

Fascist fuselage roundel
(from 1926)

During the general offensive of 21–24 June, the Regia Aeronautica bombed the French fortifications of the Alpine Line to little effect. According to General Giuseppe Santoro, this strategy was incoherent: the fortifications were designed to withstand heavy shelling and were partially buried in the mountainsides. He notes further that poor maps, fog and snow made target identification difficult, and the aircrews had not been prepared for such operations, nor were their pre-war studies on them. Only 115 out of 285 Italian bomber sorties during 21–24 June located their targets, dropping only 80 tonnes of bombs. On the morning of 23 June, Italian pilots looking for the French artillery at Cap Martin, which was engaging Italian troops in Menton, accidentally bombed their own artillery on Capo Mortola, 10 km (6.2 mi) distant. The Armée de l'Air in southern France took no part in the defence of the Alpine Line, preferring to concentrate on defending its aerodromes from Italian attacks. Stories of Italian aircraft strafing columns of refugees on the road from Paris to Bordeaux, however, have no basis in fact. The Regia Aeronautica never ventured beyond Provence in June 1940 and only targeted military sites. Eyewitness reports of aircraft bearing red, white and green roundels are false since the Italian air force had replaced the tricolour roundel with a Fascist one by 1940.

=== Initial fighting ===
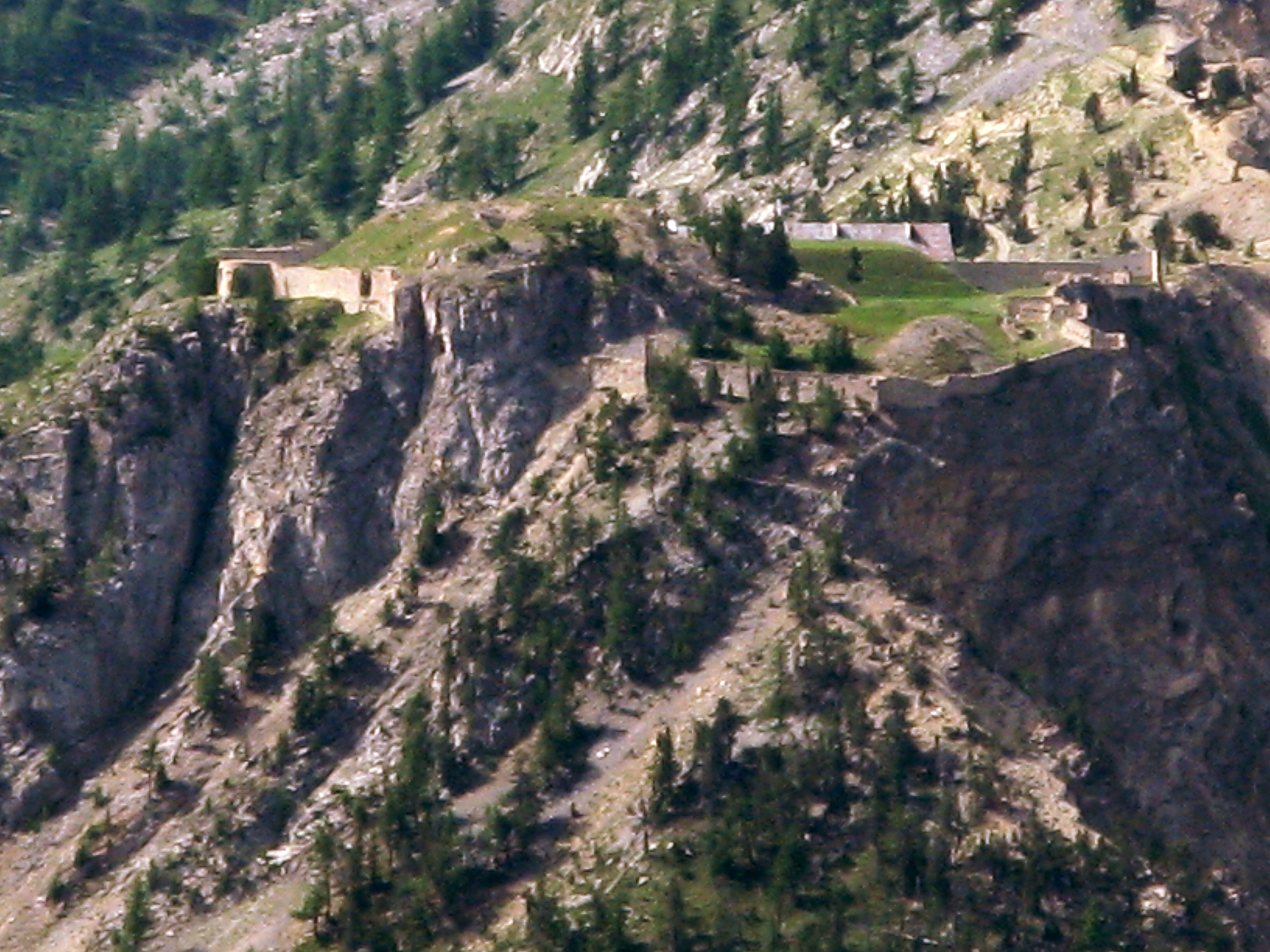
Fort de l'Olive, from the Aiguille Rouge

During the day on 12 June, French SES groups (scout troops on skis) crossed the border and skirmished with Italian units in the Maddalena Pass. An Italian outpost was surprised, resulting in the death of an Italian NCO and a further two soldiers being wounded. The Italian defensive attitude changed with the collapse of Paul Reynaud's government, in France, on 15 June. Since Reynaud's successor, General Pétain, was known to favour an understanding with Germany, Mussolini believed it was imperative that the Italians make gains before an armistice could be signed. The same day he ordered Army Group West to prepare to begin an offensive in three days: an unrealistically aggressive timeline. Badoglio insisted that converting the troops from a defensive to an offensive disposition alone would take 25 days. The Supreme General Staff thus turned Mussolini's order into two directives: the first permitted Italian incursions into French territory, while the second abrogated the staging plan then in force (Note: This was P.R. 12 (Piano Radunata 12 or Staging Plan 12), designed for war with Britain and France, with Greece, Turkey and Yugoslavia neutral. It placed Italian troops in the Alps in a defensive stance. It was first drawn up in January 1938, updated in April 1939 and again in March 1940. On 26 May, when the decision for war was taken, a slightly modified P.R. 12bis was adopted, since Yugoslavia was perceived as hostile. This was abandoned after Ciano succeeded in convincing the Yugoslav ambassador of Italy's peaceful intentions towards his country on 29 May.) and ordered the army group to prepare to take advantage of the possible collapse of the Armée des Alpes.

On 16 June, Marshal Graziani gave the order for offensive operations to begin within ten days. Three actions were planned: Operation B through the Little Saint Bernard Pass, Operation M through the Maddalena Pass and Operation R along the Riviera. That day, elements of the Italian 4th Army attacked in the vicinity of Briançon. As the Italians advanced, the French at Fort de l'Olive began bombarding the Italian Fort Bardonecchia. In retaliation, the 149-mm guns of the Italian fort on Mont Chaberton—"an imposing structure lost in the clouds at an altitude of 3,130 meters"—were trained on Fort de l'Olive. The Italian bombardment silenced the French fort the following day.

On 17 June, Pétain announced, "It is with a heavy heart that I tell you today that we must stop fighting." (Note: C'est le coeur serré que je vous dis aujourd'hui qu'il faut cesser le combat.) This stoked the belief among the Italians that the French Army of the Alps was on the point of dissolving, if not already in the process of collapse. The Supreme General Staff also falsely believed that the German advance in the Rhône Valley would force the French to begin evacuating their Alpine forts. In orders to his troops on 18 June, General Paolo Micheletti of the 1st Alpine Division "Taurinense" advised that "a strong resistance cannot be anticipated, owing to the shaken [French] morale." Micheletti, indeed, was more concerned about bands of armed fuoriusciti (Italian political exiles) rumoured to be in the area than about the French.

On 18 June, the guns of Fort Chaberton, which dominated the Col de Montgenèvre, fired upon the small French Ouvrage Gondran, near Briançon, in aid of the Italian ground advance. The shots did little damage to the French fort, but had a strong moral effect on the French. During the day, Army Group West received two seemingly contradictory orders: "the hostilities against France had to be immediately suspended" and "the preparation for the previously announced [...] operations should continue at the same pace". The purpose of these orders is still not clear, but as word spread through the Italian ranks many began to celebrate the end of the war and even to fraternize with the French. The commanders at the front were ordered to explain the situation correctly to their troops: hostilities would eventually resume. That day Mussolini met Hitler in Munich and was informed that Italian claims on Nice, Corsica and Tunisia were interfering with Germany's armistice negotiations. The implication was clear: Italian claims had to be backed up by military feats if they wanted German support for their claims.

=== French naval offensive ===
Prior to the Italian declaration of war, the British Royal Navy and the French Marine Nationale (the French National Navy) had planned to sortie into the Mediterranean and provoke the Regia Marina (the Italian Royal Navy) into battle: the British by sending the Mediterranean Fleet towards Malta (in a move that also sought to test the effectiveness of the Italian air and submarine forces) (Note: On 21 September 1939, Italy agreed with Britain that her submarines would remain on the surface and under escort when outside of their exercise areas, of which Britain was to be notified in advance. This meant that any detected submerged submarine was presumed to be hostile.) and the French by attacking shore targets in the Gulf of Genoa, the Tyrrhenian Sea, along southern Italy, Sicily and the Dodecanese. The Allied fleets held a 12:1 advantage, in the Mediterranean, in capital ships over the Italians. (Note: Overall, on 10 June 1940, the Allied and Italian navies were disposed as follows: British Royal Navy: 62 combat surface ships and 12 submarines based around the Mediterranean.; French Navy: 78 surface ships, in addition to six torpedo boats, and 40 submarines based in the Mediterranean.; Italian Royal Navy: 83 surface ships, 138 torpedo boats, and 113 submarines.) Admiral Domenico Cavagnari, chief of staff of the Italian navy, held an opposing view to a decisive battle between the opposing fleets. Cavagnari preferred to utilize his surface force to mine the Sicilian Channel while deploying his submarines en masse to seek out and engage Allied ships.

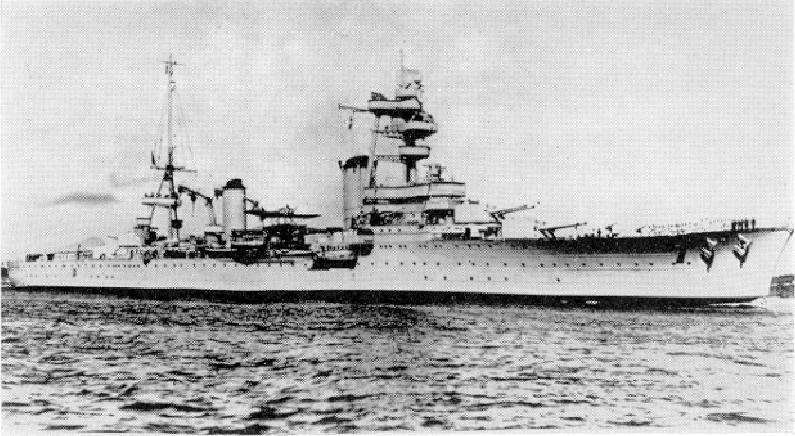
Foch, a Suffren-class cruiser (as were Colbert and Dupleix)

With France in the process of being overrun by Germany, the naval offensive envisioned by the allies was not undertaken. Rather, four French cruisers supported by three destroyers conducted a patrol of the Aegean Sea during the opening days of the war with Italy while much of the French submarine fleet put to sea. The Royal Navy, instead of sortieing towards Malta, confined themselves to the coast of Africa.

On 12 June, elements of the French fleet sortied in response to a report of German warships entering the Mediterranean. The report turned out to be incorrect, but the French ships entered the sights of the Italian submarine Dandolo which fired torpedoes, without success, on the light cruisers Jean de Vienne, La Galissonnière, and Marseillaise. That same day, the Italian submarine Alpino Bagnolini sank the British cruiser HMS Calypso south of Crete.

On 13 June, the Marine Nationale launched Operation Vado. The French 3rd Squadron, comprising four heavy cruisers and 11 destroyers, left Toulon and sailed for Italy. (Note: The heavy cruisers Algérie, Colbert, Dupleix, and Foch. The Aigle class destroyers, Albatros, Vauban, Vautour, Guépard, Lion, Valmy, Verdun, Tartu, Chevalier Paul, and Cassard.) At 0426 hours on 14 June, the French heavy cruisers opened fire on shore targets. Firing from 15,000 metres (16,000 yards), the Algérie struck oil storage tanks in Vado Ligure, but found subsequent shooting difficult due to "the smoke pouring from the burning tanks", while the Foch fired upon a steel mill in Savona. The Colbert and Dupleix, firing from 13,000 metres (14,000 yards), attacked a gasworks at Sestri Ponente. (Note: Three civilians were killed and a dozen more wounded.) In response, Italian shore batteries to the west of Genoa and at Savona and an armoured train (Note: The Regia Marina operated two groups of armoured trains (batterie mobili ferroviaire), the Genoa Group—with logistical headquarters at La Spezia—and the Palermo Group.) opened fire on the attacking French ships. A 152-millimetre (6-inch) shell from the Batteria Mameli at Pegli penetrated the boiler room of the French destroyer Albatros, causing serious damage and killing 12 sailors. The crew of the Italian torpedo boat Calatafimi, which was in the area of Genoa escorting a minelayer, were taken by surprise by the French attack. Due to misty conditions, the ship's commanding officer, Lieutenant Giuseppe Brignole, believed that he would be able to launch a torpedo strike upon the assaulting French. As the Calatafimi moved into position, it was spotted by French destroyers and engaged. A near miss caused damage to the Italian ship's hull, but it managed to fire four torpedoes at the French force although none struck any targets. A third attempt, aiming for the cruisers Colbert and Dupleix, failed and the ship withdrew towards Genoa. Under pressure from the Italian coastal artillery, the Colbert and Dupleix withdrew.

As the capital ships pulled out of range of the Italian guns, their escorting destroyers opened fire and silenced a shore battery at Cape Vardo. To the southeast of Savona, the Italian 13th MAS squadron had been patrolling and moved rapidly towards the French force, near Genoa and Savona, once they opened fire. MAS539 was able to get within 1,800 metres (2,000 yards) of the Algérie and Foch before firing its torpedoes although without success. As the French withdrew, MAS534 and MAS538 each fired two torpedoes at the French cruisers, although all missed. MAS535 was struck during the squadron's attack, resulting in light damage to the boat and the crew suffering three casualties. The entire force withdrew as planned and arrived back in port before midday on 14 June. In total, the French ships fired 1,500 shells and the Italian shore guns fired around 300. The French reported "that they had subjected their targets to a sustained and effective bombardment", although later noted that "the results of the fire against the shore ... were nearly null, causing damage of no importance." The crew of the Calatafimi believed "the flash of the shell hitting Albatross marked the detonation of their torpedoes." This claim was used for propaganda purposes and "lent an exaggerated aura of efficiency to the Italian coastal forces." As the French squadron had ended the bombardment shortly after Calatafimi's attack, on the Italian side it was claimed that this ship's counterattack, together with the reaction by the coastal batteries, had induced the enemy squadron to withdraw. Lieutenant Brignole was awarded the Gold Medal of Military Valor for his resolved attack against a much larger enemy force.

In coordination with the Marine Nationale, eight Lioré et Olivier LeO 45s of the Armée de l'Air bombed Italian aerodromes, and nine Fairey Swordfishes of No. 767 Squadron of the British Fleet Air Arm, based in Hyères, attacked Genoa; these attacks, however, inflicted little damage and casualties. The French naval action precipitated Mussolini's order to the air force to begin strikes on metropolitan France, although reconnaissance operations had already been undertaken.

On 17 June, the Italian submarine Provana attacked a French convoy off Oran but was depth charged by the sloop La Curieuse, forced to surface and then sunk by ramming. La Curieuse also sustained heavy damage. This was the only Italian submarine to be sunk by the French Navy. Further sorties by French cruisers and destroyers on 18 and 19 June did not result in any action. On 21 June, the French battleship Lorraine, accompanied by the British cruisers HMS Orion and HMS Neptune, the Australian cruiser HMAS Sydney, and a further four British destroyers, opened fire on the port of Bardia in Italian Libya. This bombardment, however, caused only minimal damage; this was the last combined British and French naval operation before the French surrender. French naval aircraft also attacked Livorno in mainland Italy during some of the last actions of the French against the Italians; a hotel and a beach resort were destroyed, but otherwise, little damage was caused.

On 18 June, the staff of the Regia Marina conducted a study which showed that a landing on Malta was not feasible, despite the island's paucity of defences. This was accepted by Badoglio at the first meeting of the several chiefs of staff during the war, on 25 June.

=== Italian offensive (21–24 June) ===
On 19 June, General Roatta wrote to Army Group West that "it might be that there are French troops in the fortifications, but it is probable that the mobile troops, situated in the rear, are already in retreat." These false beliefs about retreat did not trickle down to the front commanders, but belief in low French morale did. Some Italian officers jokingly lectured their troops on how to behave with the French girls. Thus, when the main offensive began, the Italians, led by overconfident officers, advanced in orderly columns into the range of the French forts.

On 19 June, Mussolini ordered his generals to seek contact with the enemy, and at 2050 hours Roatta sent a directive to "undertake small offensive operations immediately" and "make contact with the enemy everywhere, to decisively harass enemy forces as harshly as possible." The main offensive was to begin "as soon as possible [and] no later than 23 June" (al più presto possibile ... non oltre il 23 corrente). On the morning of 20 June, Mussolini told Badoglio to start the offensive immediately by the next morning, stating "I do not want to suffer the shame of the Germans occupying Nice and remitting it to us." Badoglio ordered Graziani: "Tomorrow, the 21st, at the commencement of action at 0300 hours, the First and Fourth Armies will whole-heartedly attack along the entire front. Goal: penetrate as deeply as possible into French territory." At 1745 hours that day, Graziani ordered Army Group West:

The Germans have occupied Lyon, it must be categorically avoided that they arrive first at the sea. By three-o'-clock tonight [i.e., 3:00 a.m.], you must attack along the whole front from the Little Saint Bernard to the sea (per questa notte alle 3 dovete attaccare su tutta la fronte dal San Bernardo al mare). The air force will contribute by mass bombardment of the fortifications and cities. The Germans, during the day tomorrow and the day after, will send armoured columns originating from Lyon in the direction of Chambéry, Saint-Pierre de Chartreuse and Grenoble.

Graziani then modified his directive of 16 June: now, the main goal of the offensive was Marseille. This final edition of the offensive plan had only two main actions, Operation M through the Little Saint Bernard and Operation R along the Riviera, the action in the Maddalena Pass being reduced to a diversionary advance. The immediate objective of Operation M was Albertville, while that of R was the town of Menton. At 2000 hours on 20 June, Mussolini countermanded the attack order, but before it could go out to the troops, he received confirmation that Germany was continuing its push down the Rhône valley despite the impending armistice. He then revoked his countermand, only shifting the emphasis to the northern sector of the front, as his generals had urged all along.

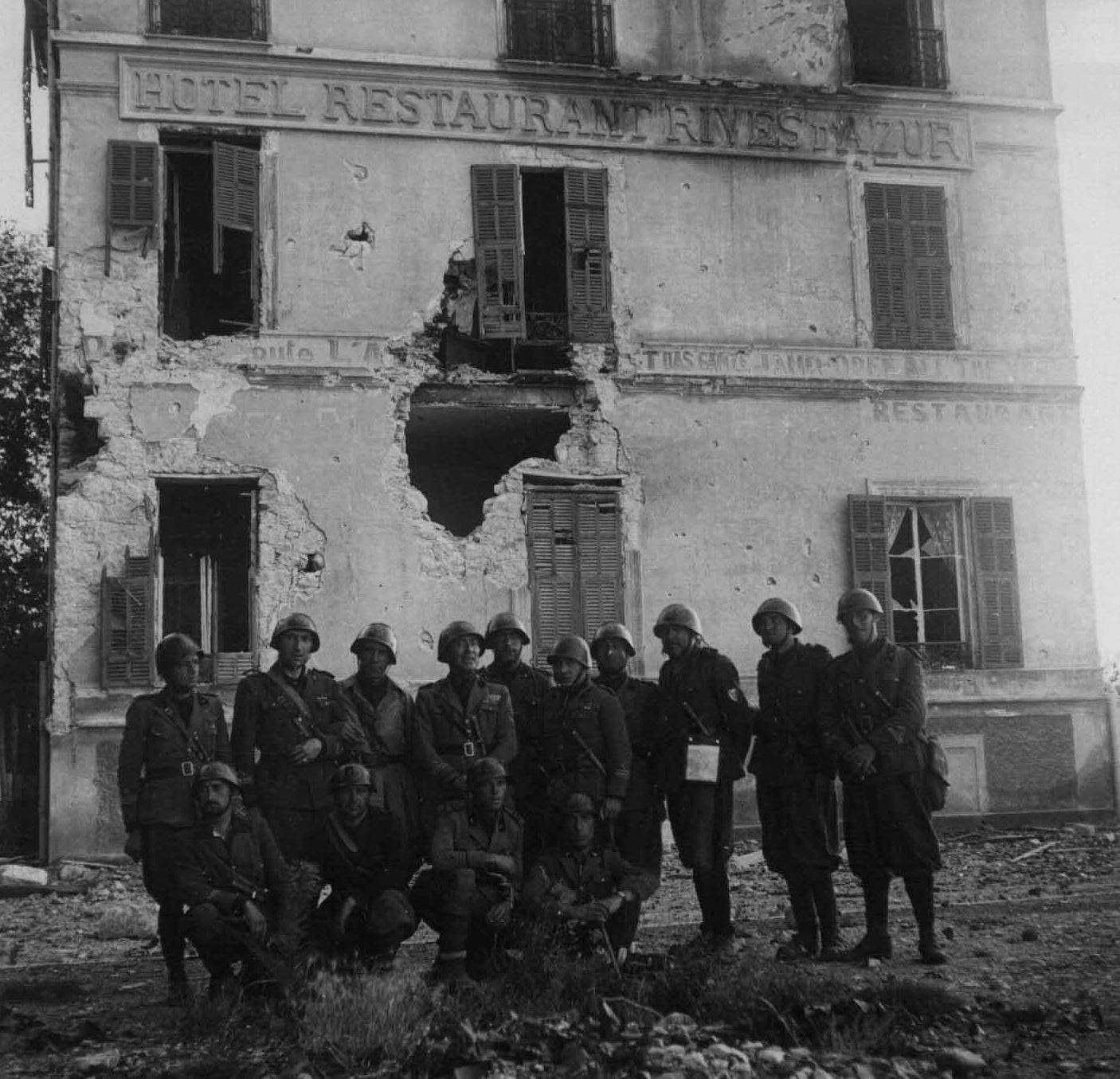
Italian troops in Menton in June 1940

On 20 June, the guns of the Italian fort atop Mont Chaberton—nicknamed "battleship in the clouds" (cuirassé des nuages) by the French—switched targets to the French fort Ouvrage Janus. This French position was unable to train its battery of six guns on the Italian position and return fire. Due to the supporting fire of the fort, the Italian troops were able to advance and capture the village of Montgenèvre. However, no further gains were made in the Briançon sector as the French were able to hold the line. On 21 June, the French had been able to manoeuvre a battery of 280-mm mortars of the 154th Artillery Regiment into a position at the foot of the Fort de l'Infernet to fire on Fort Chaberton. Over a three-day period, with firing delayed and interrupted by adverse weather, the French were able to silence six of the eight armoured turrets of the Italian fort in only 57 shots. Obscured by fog, the remaining two turrets continued to fire until the armistice.

On 21 June, the main Italian offensive began. Early that morning, Italian troops crossed the French border at points all along the front. Initially, the Italian offensive enjoyed some level of success. The French defensive lines were weakened due to the French high command shuffling forces north to fight the Germans. The Italian forces attacking through the Riviera—about 80,000 strong including reserves—advanced about 8 km (5 mi) on 21 June. Near the coast the French had the greatest concentration of forces, about 38,000 troops.

In the Seuil valley, named after a hamlet located in Maurienne near the town of Modane in Savoy, French forces made up of light field positions based in the small forts prevented the Italians from invading down the vallue. The belligerents were pinned down on the Alpine peaks separating France from Italy, unable to retreat, as the Italians forbade any withdrawal. The 91st and 92nd Infantry Regiments, lacking mountain equipment, faced a severe ordeal. For ten days, the Italians lived without warm clothing or shoes suitable for the harsh climatic conditions of the mountains. Without food and without ammunition. A number of these soldiers suffered frostbite.

==== 4th Army ====
===== Alpine Army Corps =====
Italian offensive through the Little Saint Bernard towards Bourg-Saint-Maurice

The main Italian attack was by the 4th Army under General Alfredo Guzzoni. The Alpine Army Corps reinforced by the corps artillery of the IV Army Corps on its left flank opened up its offensive on a front stretching 34–40 km (21–25 mi) from the Col de la Seigne to the Col du Mont. Its main thrust was through the Little Saint Bernard Pass, which would have been the easiest route, had the French not destroyed the bridges. This route was covered by the Redoute Ruinée, the ruins of an old fort, which the French garrisoned with seventy men plus machine guns, (Note: This was Fort Traversette to the Italians, since that had been its original name when built by the House of Savoy (founding royal house of Italy) in the 17th century.) and by the avant-poste (advance post) at Seloge (Séloges). The total strength of the French in the barrage of Bourg-Saint-Maurice, part of the sub-sector (sous-secteur) of Tarentaise, was 3,000 men, 350 machine guns and 150 other guns. (Note: Kaufmann and Kaufmann say that the French positions at Bourg-Saint-Maurice were held by 5,500 troops.) These forces were backed by 18 battalions with 60 guns. The primary objectives of the Alpine Army Corps were capturing Bourg-Saint-Maurice, Les Chapieux, Séez and Tignes. After that, they were to advance on to Beaufort and Albertville.

On 21 June, the right column of the Alpine Army Corps took the Seigne Pass and advanced several kilometres across a glacier, but were met with heavy fire from Seloge. They quickly outflanked it and on 24 June charged up the Cormet de Roselend, but they were still in the process of completing their encirclement when the armistice was signed. The central column passed through the Little Saint Bernard only to be stopped by fire from the Redoute Ruinée. The 101st Motorised Division "Trieste" of the Army of the Po was brought up from Piacenza to reinforce the attack. At 1100 hours the Trieste's motorcycle battalion broke through the pass and began a rapid advance for 2 km (1.2 mi). They then forded a river under heavy machine gun fire, while Italian engineers repaired the demolished bridge, suffering heavy losses in the process.

On 22 June, the Trieste's tank battalion passed the motorcycles and was stopped at a minefield. Two L3s became entrapped in barbed wire and of those following, one struck a landmine trying to go around the leading two, another fell into a ditch doing the same and the remaining two suffered engine failure. That same day, a battalion of the 65th Motorised Infantry Regiment of the Trieste Division was met by French infantry and field fortifications while trying to attack the Redoute from the rear. A machine gun unit relieved them and they abandoned the assault, continuing instead to Séez. The left column of the Alpine Corp met only weak resistance and attained the right bank of the Isère on 22 June. By the armistice the central column had occupied Séez, but the Italians never brought up the artillery required to reduce the Redoute Ruinée, reinforced in the meantime. Although they did manage to damage the fort, its guns continued to hamper passage of the Little Saint Bernard until the armistice. The Alpine Army Corps did not take its ultimate objective, Bourg-Saint-Maurice. At the armistice they let the Redoute's garrison march out with honours of war.

===== I Army Corps =====
Italian offensive around Mont Cenis. In the Treaty of Peace with Italy of 1947, the pass of Mont Cenis was ceded to France.

To the south of the Alpine Army Corps, the I Army Corps advanced along a front of 40 km (25 mi) from Mont Cenis to the Col d'Étache. Their subsidiary objective called for them to break through the French forts at Bessans, Lanslebourg and Sollières-Sardières and the collection of ouvrages (Saint-Gobain, Saint-Antoine, Sapey) overlooking Modane and then turn north in the direction of Albertville. The Battalions Val Cenischia and Susa (under Major Costantino Boccalatte) of the 3rd Alpini Regiment of the Division Taurinense were attached to the Division Cagliari. The main attack of the I Army Corps was a three-pronged drive by the Division Cagliari, involving the capture of Bessans and Bramans, followed by a concerted advance along the river Arc toward Modane. The central column consisted of the 1st and 2nd Battalions of the 64th Infantry Regiment and the 3rd Battalion of the 62nd Regiment. They advanced through the Col des Lacs Giaset and advanced down the valley of the Ambin.

The 2nd Battalion of the 63rd Infantry Regiment crossed the Little Mont Cenis towards the village of Le Planay, where it joined the central column, while the 1st Battalion crossed the Pas de Bellecombe and augmented the central column at the village of La Villette. The Val Cenischia unit formed the left column that passed through the Col d'Étache. It was supposed to synchronise its attack on the flank of Modane with the arrival of the central column. The Susa under Major Boccalatte formed the right column and crossed the Pas du Chapeau and the Novalesa pass and followed the river Ribon towards Bessans. It was then to follow the Arc to Lanslebourg, meeting up with Colonel Cobianchi's 3rd Battalion of the 64th Infantry Regiment of the Division Cagliari, advancing across the Col de Mont Cenis. The French garrisons these forces faced were 4,500 strong, backed by two divisions with sixty tanks behind them. The French also had an advanced post at Arcellins, consisting of three blockhouses, which were submerged in fog much of the time. The Italian reserve consisted of the Division Brennero around Lake Mont Cenis.

The central column began its descent through the Col des Lacs Giaset shortly after noon on 21 June. As it approached the river Ambin it met strong resistance. The 2nd Battalion coming down the Little Mont Cenis had overcome weak resistance and met the central column. Some small groups were left behind for mopping up operations while the bulk of the column continued its advance towards Bramans. All the Cagliari battalions coalesced around a chapel outside Bramans, and, after eliminating the French field fortifications with artillery fire, they took the city by the end of the first day. One battalion diverted to Termignon to meet up with the Battalion Susa, while the rest proceeded towards Modane. The Battalion Val Cenischia met no resistance as it crossed the Col d'Étache and the Col de Bramanette and emerged in the rear of the Fort de la Balme. The fortifications were taken on 23 June by the Division Cagliari, but the forts in front of Modane—Saint-Gobain at Villarodin and the Barrière de l'Esseillon—were much stronger. The Italians attempted to flank them from the south, and their artillery engaged the forts' guns. The forts were not reduced by the time the armistice came into effect, although the advance units of the Cagliari were within five kilometres (three miles) of Modane.

While the Susa had occupied Lanslebourg and moved on to Termignon, the 3rd Battalion of the 64th Infantry had been held up. Its route was heavily mined and strewn with anti-infantry and anti-tank obstacles. A battalion of the 231st Avellino Infantry Regiment and a tank battalion from the Division Brennero were sent up to assist it. Two L3 tankettes hit landmines on the narrow cliffside road, halting the entire column and allowing the French artillery to eliminate the tanks following. The Italian infantry could only advance very slowly into heavy fire and in certain cases, having passed well-concealed French machine gun nests, found themselves taking fire in their rear. The Italians managed to surround the powerful Fort de la Turra, but at the armistice, it and the advanced post at Arcellins were still firing. The Italian column had not reached Lanslebourg, which had been occupied days earlier by Major Boccalatte.

==== 1st Army ====
Invasion routes of the 1st Army

The 1st Army had been spared responsibility for the main attack—which fell to the 4th Army in the north—because of the appeals of its commander, General Pietro Pintor, on 20 June. The southern front of the 1st Army, from Monte Grammondo to the coast, was held by the 37th Infantry Division "Modena" and the 5th Infantry Division "Cosseria". It had the 52nd Infantry Division "Torino" of the Army of the Po in reserve. It opened its offensive along the whole front on 20 June and in most places was easily repulsed by French artillery.

On 21 June, the units advancing through the Val Roia successfully occupied Fontan. The Cosseria Division, coming down the coast towards Nice, were supposed to be met by some Alpini coming down the valley of the Vésubie and by the San Marco Regiment making an amphibious landing behind the French Ouvrage Cap Martin. The amphibious assault had to be called off for logistical reasons—engine failures, overloaded boats, and rough seas. Lacking sufficient landing craft, the Regia Marina had commandeered fishing boats and pleasure boats. The Italian navy attempted some landings, but after several craft grounded the whole operation was called off. The Cosseria Division was met by a barrage of shellfire from Cap Martin and the Ouvrage Mont Agel, which destroyed an armoured train. Nonetheless, assisted by thunderstorms and fog, they occupied the Les Granges-Saint-Paul on 22 June. Mussolini then gave the order that the Cosseria were to advance at all costs.

On the night of 22/23 June, still under the cover of fog, the Cosseria Division bypassed Cap Martin and then entered the Garavan quarter of Menton. The bypassed French troops continued to fight, firing the fort's armament at Italian coastal shipping, until the armistice. The fighting in the streets of Menton was fierce. The Italians pushed through the Baousset quarter and took the hilltop Capuchin monastery of Notre-Dame de l'Annonciade on 23 June. A planned naval landing at Garavan by the Blackshirts (Milizia Volontaria per la Sicurezza Nazionale, MVSN) on 24 June had to be called off because of high waves and a full moon. The French—except for the garrison of the advanced fort of Pont Saint-Louis (Note: The entire bridge (pont) of Saint-Louis was Italian before the war.)—gradually withdrew from Menton.

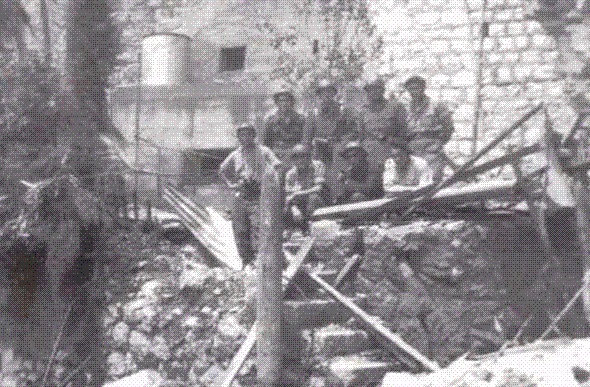
The defenders of Pont Saint-Louis

On 24 June, the Italian infantry reached the plain of Carnolès and were repulsed by the French artillery—not by the Tirailleurs sénégalais as sometimes stated. Italian aircraft then bombed the French barracks there. That day the fort of Pont Saint-Louis engaged in its last artillery duel with the Italians. No vehicles managed to cross the bridge before the armistice. The capture of "the pearl of France", Menton, a famous tourist destination, was "an undeniable success (despite its cost)" (un succès incontestable [même s'il a coûté cher]). Mussolini visited the scene of the battle on 1 July and claimed, in a subsequent radio broadcast from Rome, that "our infantry were supported by an artillery train which came through the tunnel under La Mortola and shelled the strongly held town [Menton] in which the enemy was maintaining an obstinate resistance". (Note: The New Statesman and Nation published a propaganda article mocking the Italian claims.)

Along the northern front of the 1st Army, the 33rd Infantry Division "Acqui", based at the entrance of the Valle Stura di Demonte, comprised six battalions and one legion of the MVSN (Note: One MVSN legion (legione) typically possessed about 1,300 men.) and possessed thirty 81-mm mortars, twenty-four 75/13 mountain guns and twelve 100/17 model 16 howitzers. It also had 3,500 mules (on which its artillery was carried) and horses, 68 motor vehicles, 71 motorcycles and 153 bicycles. The initial disposition of the troops was defensive, and some studies had even predicted a French mustard gas attack. On 20 June its orders were to advance up the valley 60 km (37 mi) into French territory on the only road through the valley. Its radios did not function in the rainy weather, and it soon left its food supply far in the rear, but on 23 June it reached the Maddalena Pass—with only one 100/17 howitzer in tow—and began descending the Ubaye Valley into France. Heavy snow and fog slowed their advance, but also prevented the French gunners from adjusting their aim. The Acqui Division did not reach the French fortification until late on the 24th, by which time the armistice had been signed. They lost 32 dead and counted 90 wounded, 198 frostbitten and 15 missing. Because of a lack of artillery in the Ubaye Valley, they had not fired upon the French forts.

== Aftermath ==
=== Armistice ===
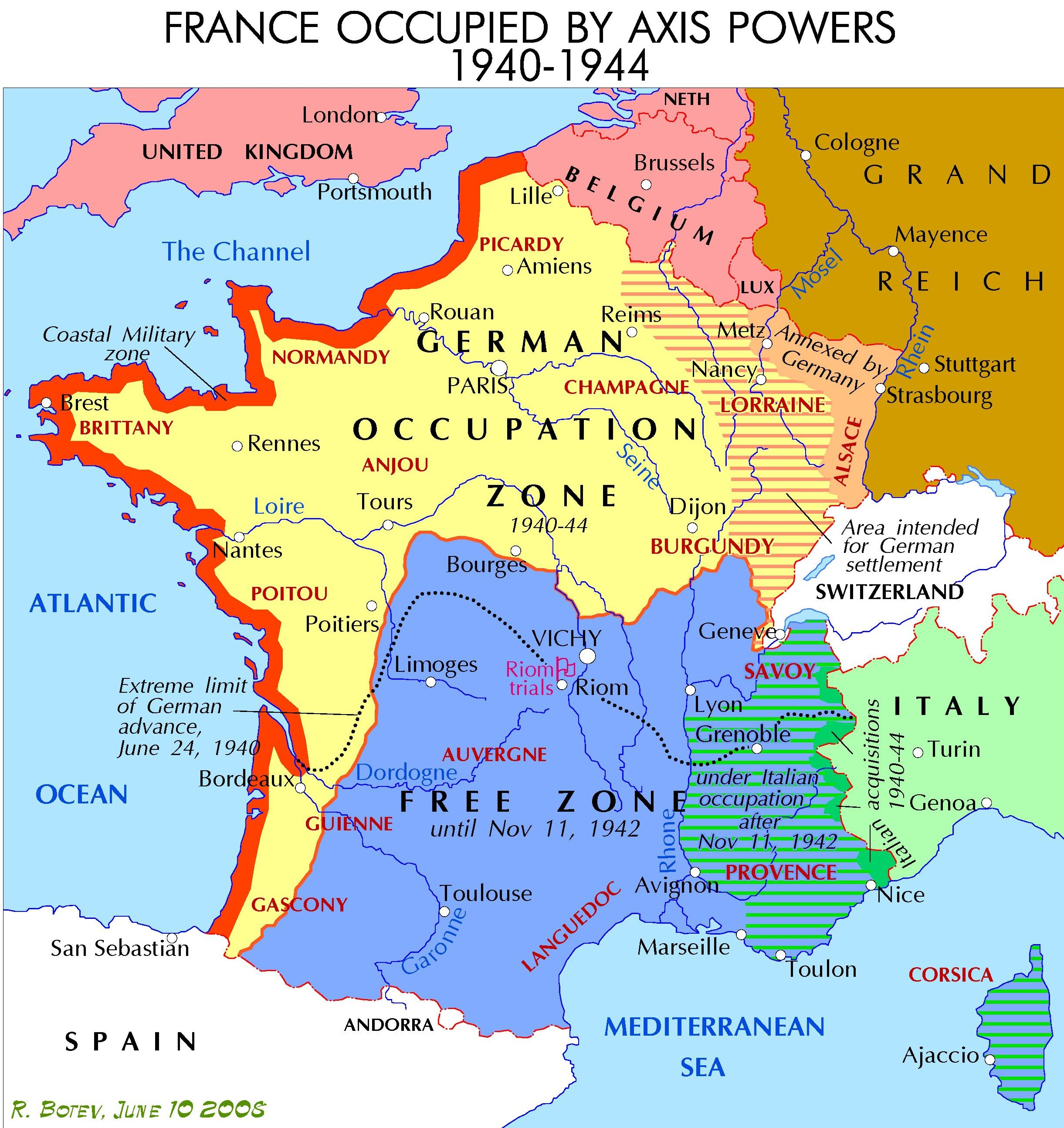
France during the war. The initial Italian occupation occurred in June 1940, and it was then expanded in November 1942 (dark green).

On 17 June, the day after he transmitted a formal request for an armistice to the German government, French Foreign Minister Paul Baudoin handed to the Papal nuncio Valerio Valeri a note that said: "The French government, headed by Marshal Pétain, requests that the Holy See transmit to the Italian government as quickly as possible the note it has also transmitted through the Spanish ambassador to the German government. It also requests that he convey to the Italian government its desire to find together the basis of a lasting peace between the two countries." That same morning, Mussolini received word from Hitler that France had asked Germany for an armistice, and he went to meet Hitler at Munich, charging General Roatta, Admiral Raffaele de Courten and Air Brigadier Egisto Perino with drafting Italy's demands. The final list of demands actually presented to the French were mild, and Italy dropped its claims to the Rhône valley, Corsica, Tunisia, (Note: The failure to seize Tunis or Bizerte in Tunisia—more valuable ports than those in Italy for supplying Italian troops in Africa—was slammed by Roatta in his memoirs.) and French Somaliland. According to Roatta, it was Mussolini's signorilità (sportsmanship) that compelled him not to demand more than he had conquered.

On the evening of 21 June, Ambassador Dino Alfieri in Berlin transmitted the German armistice terms to Rome. According to Ciano, "under these [mild] conditions, Mussolini is not prepared to make territorial demands ... and [will] wait for the peace conference to make all our formal demands." He added that Mussolini wished to delay the meeting with the French in the hopes that General Gambara would take Nice.

At 1500 hours on 23 June, the French delegation, headed by General Charles Huntziger, who had signed the German armistice the previous day, landed in Rome aboard three German aircraft. The French negotiators were the same who had met with the Germans. The first meeting of the two delegations took place at 1930 hours at the Villa Incisa all'Olgiata on the Via Cassia. It lasted only twenty-five minutes, during which Roatta read out loud Italy's proposed terms, Huntziger requested a recess to confer with his government and Ciano adjourned the meeting until the next day. During the adjournment, Hitler informed Mussolini that he thought the Italian demands were too light, and he proposed linking up the German and Italian occupation zones. Roatta ultimately convinced Mussolini that it was too late to change the demands.

At 1915 hours on 24 June, at the Villa Incisa, after receiving his government's permission, General Huntziger signed the armistice on behalf of the French, and Marshal Badoglio did so for the Italians. Both armistices came into effect at thirty-five minutes past midnight (0035 hours) (Note: Some authorities say 0135 hours, which is more consistent with the six-hour delay between signing and coming into force reported by Auphan and Mordal.) on 25 June. Just minutes before the signing, Huntziger had asked Badoglio to strike the clause calling for the repatriation to Italy of political refugees (like the socialist Pietro Nenni). Badoglio consulted Mussolini, who agreed.

The Franco-Italian Armistice established a modest demilitarized zone 50 km (31 mi) deep on the French side of the border, thus eliminating the Alpine Line. The actual Italian occupation zone was no more than what had been occupied up to the armistice. It contained 832 km^{2} and 28,500 inhabitants, which included the city of Menton and its 21,700 inhabitants. Italy retained the right to interfere in French territory as far as the Rhône, but it did not occupy this area until after the Allied invasion of French North Africa in November 1942. In addition, demilitarized zones were established in the French colonies in Africa. Italy was granted the right to use the port of Djibouti in Somaliland with all its equipment, along with the French section of the Addis Ababa–Djibouti railway. More importantly, the naval bases of Toulon, Bizerte, Ajaccio and Oran were also to be demilitarized within fifteen days. Despite the terms of the armistice, the Battle of the Alps is often regarded as a French defensive victory.

=== Casualties ===
Reported French army casualties vary: 32, 37 or 40 killed; 42, 62 or 121 wounded; and 145 or 155 prisoners. (Note: Sometimes instead of prisoners, 150 French are reported as "missing". Rochat gives 259 as the total of captured and missing. The Italians reported taking 153 prisoners.) The Army of the Alps suffered 20 killed, 84 wounded and 154 taken prisoner in the fighting with the German forces advancing from Lyon. Italian casualties amounted to 631 or 642 men killed, 2,631 wounded and 616 reported missing. A further 2,151 men suffered from frostbite during the campaign. The official Italian numbers were compiled for a report on 18 July 1940, when many of the fallen still lay under snow. It is probable that most of the Italian missing were dead. Units operating in more difficult terrain had higher ratios of missing to killed, but probably most of the missing had died. The 44th Regiment of the Infantry Division Forlì reported 21 dead, 46 wounded, 4 frostbitten and at least 296 missing, almost all of whom were captured. The official number of French POWs was 155. All Italian prisoners of war—there is no record of how many there were, perhaps 1,141—were released immediately, but the armistice negotiators seem to have forgotten the French prisoners, who were sent to the camp at Fonte d'Amore near Sulmona, later joined by 200 British and 600 Greeks. Although treated in accordance with the laws of war by the Italians, they probably fell into German hands after Italy's surrender in September 1943.

=== Analysis ===
Battle for France. Note Italian invasion in the south.

The limited demands of the Italian government at the armistice led to speculation in contemporary Italian sources. General Roatta believed that Mussolini curbed his intentions because the military had failed to break the French front line and Mussolini was thus "demonstrating his sportsmanship". Dino Alfieri advanced the popular but controversial argument that Mussolini weakened his armistice demands to "maintain some semblance of a continental balance of power". MacGregor Knox wrote that the claims of Ciano and Alfieri are fanciful but "Mussolini's humiliation over the results of the first day's attack in the Alps ... did contribute to his decision to reduce his demands". Knox wrote that Ciano's diary and Mussolini's comments to Hitler "quite adequately explain" the Italian position given the "strategic situation". The army had failed to break through the Alps and the French were willing to fight on—as Huntziger had made clear to the Germans.

Samuel W. Mitcham wrote that Mussolini was forced to abandon most of what he wanted at the behest of Hitler, who did not wish to see the arrival of the Italians to be greatly rewarded. Gerhard Weinberg wrote that "the singularly inglorious record of the Italians in what little fighting they had done ... facilitated German policy" and forced Mussolini to review his armistice demands. Italian war aims remained geographically expansive and a programme published on 26 June set out the acquisition of Nice, Corsica, Tunisia, Malta, southern Switzerland and Cyprus as war aims, as well as replacing Britain and France in Egypt, Iraq, Somaliland, the Persian Gulf and southern Arabia.

The historians' consensus is that the Italian military fared poorly during the invasion. On 21 June 1940, Ciano recorded in his diary that Mussolini felt humiliated by the invasion of France as "our troops have not made a step forward. Even today, they were unable to pass, and stopped in front of the first French strong point that resisted." Mussolini lambasted the spirit of the Italian people for the failure of the first day of the offensive. Following the armistice, highlighting his unhappiness, he remarked that it was "more a political than a military armistice after only fifteen days of war—but it gives us a good document in hand".

Knox called the Italian attacks into the Alps a "fiasco", which had moral implications for the Italian generals and noted that the campaign was a humiliation for Mussolini. Paul Collier called the Italian attacks "hapless" and the Italian contribution to victory over France "ignominious". Giorgio Rochat wrote that "the end result of the great Italian offensive was quite miserable". Italian divisions were binary formations (divisione binaria); consisting of two regiments instead of the usual three. The Italian military requested aid from the Germans to outflank the French positions. The initial German attack was checked and the "French soldiers of the Alps ... did not have to face military defeat as their government had finally succeeded in negotiating an armistice with Italy". To explain the Italian deficiency, they wrote that the Italian superiority in numbers was betrayed by poor equipment, inferior to that of their French counterparts and that "the stormy Alpine weather was probably the best ally the French had".

A German officer who visited the Alpine battle sites after the armistice remarked that the Blitzkrieg tactics that had served Germany well in northern France would have been difficult in the Alpine terrain, which has been called "perhaps the most unsuitable of all conceivable theatres of operation". The attack through the Little Saint Bernard Pass in the Alps also stalled on the first day due to a massive snowstorm. Italian troops stuck in the snow were easy targets for French snipers and the winding mule trails provided plenty of opportunity for SES squads to lay ambushes. The snow also hampered the movement of artillery, food and ammunition to the summits. Richard Carrier emphasised the leadership of General Olry, that it was his leadership and autonomy from the dithering politicians in Paris that allowed him, his staff and his officers to demonstrate remarkable efficiency in checking the Italian advance and the German attempt down the Rhone as well.

In some cases, the Italians wore their gas masks because of the difficulty of breathing in the driving snow. Advanced troops outran their food supplies and could not be revictualed. For example, on 23 June, the front-line commander of the 4th Alpine Division "Cuneense" complained to his superior of the 2nd Army that he was unable to keep in touch with the troops at the front because he could not move his headquarters up the mountain due to the weather. Italian field kitchens sometimes lacked the pots and pans to provide warm meals. The Italians also had an insufficient number of sappers and poor intelligence of French gun emplacements, making the elimination of the forts impossible. In the opinion of General Emilio Faldella, commander of the 3rd Alpini Regiment during the invasion of France, the Italian leadership was asking too much of its soldiers,

At the front, near the border, the mission of the French forts was to delay the Italian army from reaching the line of defense, made up of steel and concrete fortifications. . . Our infantry had to advance in the open against well-protected troops through a field under French artillery fire. . . And all this was to happen in three to four days. In these conditions, greater Italian manpower has no advantage. . . It would be a mistake to say that a battle was fought in the western Alps; what took place were only preliminary actions, technically called 'making contact'. It is not possible to speak in terms of victory or defeat. . .

== See also ==
- France–Italy relations
- List of French military equipment of World War II
- List of Italian Army equipment in World War II

== Bibliography ==
=== Books ===
- Auphan, Gabriel Paul; Mordal, Jacques (1959). The French Navy in World War II. Annapolis, MD: United States Naval Institute.
- Badoglio, Pietro (1946). L'Italia nella seconda Guerra mondiale (in Italian). Milano: Mondadori.
- Bell, P. M. H. (1997) [1986]. The Origins of the Second World War in Europe (2nd ed.). Pearson. ISBN 978-0-582-30470-3.
- Bideleux, Robert; Jeffries, Ian (1998). A History of Eastern Europe: Crisis and Change. Routledge. ISBN 978-0-415-16111-4.
- Brown, David (2004). Road to Oran: Anglo-French Naval Relations, September 1939 – July 1980. London: Frank Cass.
- Brescia, Maurizio (2012). Mussolini's Navy: A Reference Guide to the Regia Marina, 1930–1945. Annapolis, MD: United States Naval Institute.
- Burgwyn, H. James (1997). Italian Foreign Policy in the Interwar Period, 1918–1940. Praeger. ISBN 978-0-275-94877-1.
- Burgwyn, H. James (2012). Mussolini Warlord: Failed Dreams of Empire, 1940–1943. New York: Enigma Books.
- Carrier, Richard (2002). Analyse de la puissance combative de l'armée italienne durant la guerre parallele, juin 1940 – mars 1941 [Analysis of the Italian army's fighting power during the Parallel War, June 1940 – March 1941] (PDF) (PhD thesis). Université Laval. ISBN 978-0-612-80218-6. Archived from the original (PDF) on 18 November 2018.
- Cima, Bernard; Cima, Raymond; Truttman, Michel (1995). La glorieuse défense du Pont Saint-Louis, Juin 1940 [The Heroic Defence of St Louis Bridge, June 1940] (PDF). Côte d'Azur, Ligne Maginot, 2/1. Menton: cima. ISBN 978-2-9508505-2-2. Archived (PDF) from the original on 3 March 2016.
- Clark, Martin (2005). Mussolini. Routledge. ISBN 978-0-582-06595-6.
- Collier, Paul Henry (2010). O'Neill, Robert (ed.). World War II: The Mediterranean 1940–1945. World War II: Essential Histories. Rosen Publishing. ISBN 978-1-435-89132-6.
- Corvaja, Santi (2001) [1983]. Hitler and Mussolini: The Secret Meetings [Mussolini nella tana del lupo [Milan, Dall'Oglio]]. Translated by Miller, Robert L. New York: Enigma.
- Ellis, L. F. (1954). Butler, J. R. M. (ed.). The War in France and Flanders. History of the Second World War, United Kingdom Military Series. HMSO. Archived from the original on 5 December 2014.
- Evans, Richard J. (2008). The Third Reich at War. London: Allen Lane. ISBN 978-0-713-99742-2.
- Faldella, Emilio (1977). Le Truppe alpine nella seconda guerra mondiale. Milan: Cavallotti Editore.
- Fioravanzo, Giuseppe (1949). La Marina italiana nella seconda guerra mondiale. Vol. II, La guerra nel Mediterraneo – Le azioni navali, Tomo I: dal 10 giugno 1940 al 31 marzo 1941. Ufficio Storico della Marina Militare.
- Florentin, Eddy (2008). Les rebelles de La Combattante. Flammarion. ISBN 978-2841412266.
- Forczyk, Robert (2017). Case Red: The Collapse of France, 1940. Osprey.
- Gariglio, Dario (2001). Popolo italiano! Corri alle armi: 10–25 giugno 1940, l'attacco alla Francia. Peveragno: BLU Edizioni.
- Gioannini, Marco; Massobrio, Giulio (2007). Bombardate l'Italia: Storia della guerra di distruzione aerea, 1940–1945. Rizzoli.
- Gooch, John (2007). Mussolini and His Generals: The Armed Forces and Fascist Foreign Policy, 1922–1940. New York: Cambridge University Press.
- Grenville, J. A. S.; Wasserstein, Bernard, eds. (2001). The Major International Treaties of the Twentieth Century: Volume I. Routledge. ISBN 978-0-415-23798-7.
- GUF (1967). Service Historique de l'Armée de Terre. Guerre 1939–1945. Vol. 2. Paris: Imprimerie Nationale.
- Hempel, Andrew (2005). Poland in World War II: An Illustrated Military History. New York: Hippocrene Books. ISBN 978-0-781-81004-3.
- Historique du 4^{e} régiment d'infanterie coloniale. Campagne de France, 1939–40. Limoges: Charles-Lavauzelle. 1941. Archived from the original on 11 October 2015.
- Jackson, Julian (2003). The Fall of France: The Nazi Invasion of 1940. Oxford: Oxford University Press. ISBN 978-0-192-80550-8.
- Jowett, Philip S. (2000). The Italian Army 1940–45 (1): Europe 1940–1943. Oxford & New York: Osprey. ISBN 978-1-855-32864-8.
- Jordan, John; Moulin, Jean (2013). French Cruisers, 1922–1956. Naval Institute Press.
- Kaufmann, H. W.; Jankovič-Potočnik, Aleksander; Lang, P. (2011). The Maginot Line: History and Guide. Pen & Sword Military. ISBN 978-1-848-84068-3.
- Kaufmann, J. E.; Kaufmann, H. W. (2002) [1993]. Hitler's Blitzkrieg Campaigns: The Invasion and Defense of Western Europe, 1939–1940 (2nd ed.). Da Capo Press. ISBN 978-0-306-81216-3.
- Kaufmann, J. E.; Kaufmann, H. W. (2007). Fortress France: The Maginot Line and French Defenses in World War II. Stackpole Military History Series. Stackpole Books. ISBN 978-0-811-73395-3.
- Kaufmann, J. E.; Jurga, Robert M. (2002) [1999]. Fortress Europe: European Fortifications of World War II. Cambridge, MA: Da Capo Press.
- Kundahl, George G. (2017). The Riviera at War: World War II on the Côte d'Azur. I. B. Tauris.
- Knox, MacGregor (1999) [1982]. Mussolini Unleashed, 1939–1941: Politics and Strategy in Fascist Italy's Last War. Cambridge University Press. ISBN 978-0-521-33835-6.
- Knox, MacGregor (2000). Hitler's Italian Allies: Royal Armed Forces, Fascist Regime and the War of 1940–43. Port Chester, NY: Cambridge University Press.
- Labanca, Nicola (2015). "The Italian Wars". In Richard Overy (ed.). The Oxford Illustrated History of World War II. Oxford University Press. pp. 74–109.
- Mack Smith, Denis (1976). Mussolini's Roman Empire. Longman. ISBN 978-0-29778-005-2.
- Mack Smith, Denis (1982). Mussolini. Littlehampton Book Services Ltd. ISBN 978-0-29778-005-2.
- Mackay, Robert (2003). Half the Battle: Civilian Morale in Britain During the Second World War. Manchester: Manchester University Press. ISBN 978-0-719-05894-3.
- Mallett, Robert (1998). The Italian Navy and Fascist Expansionism, 1935–1940. Cass Series: Naval Policy and History. Routledge. ISBN 978-0-333-74814-5.
- Mallett, Robert (2003). Mussolini and the Origins of the Second World War, 1933–1940. Palgrave Macmillan. ISBN 978-0-714-64432-5.
- Mary, Jean-Yves; Hohnadel, Alain; Sicard, Jacques (2009a). Hommes et Ouvrages de la Ligne Maginot, Tome 4: La fortification alpine. Paris: Histoire et Collections. ISBN 978-2-915239-46-1.
- Mary, Jean-Yves; Hohnadel, Alain; Sicard, Jacques (2009b). Hommes et Ouvrages de la Ligne Maginot, Tome 5. Paris: Histoire et Collections. ISBN 978-2-35250-127-5.
- Martel, Gordon, ed. (1999). The Origins of the Second World War Reconsidered. Routledge. ISBN 978-0-415-16325-5.
- Millett, Allan R.; Murray, Williamson, eds. (2010). Military Effectiveness: Volume 3, The Second World War (2nd ed.). Cambridge University Press. ISBN 978-0-521-73751-7.
- Ministère de la Défense (2000). Une bataille oubliée: les Alpes, 10–25 juin 1940 (PDF). Mémoire et citoyenneté. Vol. 6. Direction de la mémoire, du patrimoine et des archives. Archived from the original (PDF) on 24 September 2015.
- Mitcham, Samuel W. (2008). The Rise of the Wehrmacht: The German Armed Forces and World War II, Volume 1. Praeger. ISBN 978-0-275-99661-1.
- Moseley, Ray (2000). Mussolini's Shadow: The Double Life of Count Galeazzo Ciano. Yale University Press. ISBN 978-0-300-07917-3.
- O'Hara, Vincent P. (2009). Struggle for the Middle Sea: The Great Navies at War in the Mediterranean Theater, 1940–1945 (1st ed.). Naval Institute Press. ISBN 978-1-591-14648-3.
- Overy, Richard (2013). The Bombers and the Bombed: Allied Air War over Europe, 1940–1945. New York: Viking.
- Paoletti, Ciro (2008). A Military History of Italy. Westport, CT: Praeger. ISBN 978-0-275-98505-9.
- Pieri, Piero (1971). "La stratégie italienne sur l'échiquier méditerranéen". La Guerre en Méditerranée (1939–1945). Paris. pp. 61–78.
- Piekałkiewicz, Janusz (1987). Sea War: 1939–1945. London & New York: Blandford Press. ISBN 978-0-713-71665-8.
- Plan, Étienne; Lefèvre, Éric (1982). La bataille des Alpes, 10–25 juin 1940: L'armée invaincue. C.-Lavauzelle. ISBN 978-2-702-50008-8.
- Playfair, I. S. O.; Stitt, G. M. S.; Molony, C. J. C.; Toomer, S. E. (1954). Butler, J. R. M. (ed.). Mediterranean and Middle East. Volume I: The Early Successes Against Italy (to May 1941). History of the Second World War, United Kingdom Military Series. London: Her Majesty's Stationery Office. Archived from the original on 28 September 2018.
- Porch, Douglas (2004). The Path to Victory: The Mediterranean Theater in World War II. Farrar, Straus and Giroux. ISBN 978-0-374-20518-8.
- Richards, Dennis (1953). Butler, J. R. M. (ed.). The Royal Air Force 1939–1945, Vol I: The Fight at Odds. History of the Second World War, United Kingdom Military Series. London: Her Majesty's Stationery Office. Archived from the original on 26 June 2015.
- Rohwer, Jürgen (2005). Chronology of the War at Sea, 1939–1945: The Naval History of World War Two. Annapolis: Naval Institute Press.
- Roth, Ariel Ilan (2010). Leadership in International Relations: The Balance of Power and the Origins of World War II. Palgrave Macmillan. ISBN 978-0-230-10690-1.
- Salerno, Reynolds M. (2002). Vital Crossroads: Mediterranean Origins of the Second World War, 1935–1940. Cornell University Press. ISBN 978-0-801-43772-4.
- Shores, Christopher (1976). Regia Aeronautica: A Pictorial History of the Italian Air Force, 1940–1943. Crowley, TX: Squadron/Signal Publications. ISBN 0-89747-060-5. Archived from the original on 12 November 2014.
- Sica, Emanuele (2011). Italiani Brava Gente? The Italian Occupation of Southeastern France in the Second World War, 1940–1943 (PDF) (PhD thesis). University of Waterloo. Archived (PDF) from the original on 10 November 2014.
- Sica, Emanuele (2016). Mussolini's Army in the French Riviera: Italy's Occupation of France. University of Illinois Press. ISBN 978-0-252-03985-0.
- Stefani, Filippo (1985). La storia della dottrina e degli ordinamenti dell'Esercito italiano, t. 1^{o}: Da Vittorio Veneto alla 2^{a} guerra mondiale, no. 2^{o}: La 2^{a} guerra mondiale, 1940–1943. Rome: Stato maggiore dell'Esercito.
- Sterling, Brent L. (2009). Do Good Fences Make Good Neighbors?: What History Teaches Us about Strategic Barriers and International Security. Georgetown University Press. ISBN 978-1-589-01571-5.
- Sumner, Ian (1998). The French Army 1939–45 (1): The Army of 1939–40 and Vichy France. Men-At-Arms Series (1st English ed.). Osprey Publishing. ISBN 978-1-855-32666-8.
- Sweet, John Joseph Timothy (2007) [1980]. Iron Arm: The Mechanization of Mussolini's Army, 1920–1940. Mechanicsburg, PA: Stackpole Books. ISBN 978-0-811-73351-9.
- Témoignage de S. Chinal pour le mensuel Terra Modana No. 72, avril 2009 p. 10
- Vaschetto, Diego (2003). Strade e Sentieri del vallo Alpino. Turin: Ed. del Capricorno.
- Weinberg, Gerhard L. (1994). A World at Arms: A Global History of World War II. Cambridge University Press. ISBN 0-521-44317-2.
- Zabecki, David T., ed. (1999). World War II in Europe: An Encyclopedia. Routledge. ISBN 978-0-824-07029-8.

=== Articles ===
- Andreyev, N. (1941). "Italian Operations in the Alps". Military Review. 21 (80). Translated by Dasher, Joseph. Command and General Staff School: 57–60. ISSN 0026-4148. Archived from the original on 16 January 2015. (Originally published as Italyanskiye Operatsii v Alpakh (Итальянские Операции в Альпах/Italian Operations in the Alps) in Krasnaya Zvezda [6 October 1940] ISSN 0023-4559)
- "Armistice Between France and Italy". The American Journal of International Law. 34 (4, Supplement: Official Documents): 178–83. October 1940. doi:10.2307/2213458. ISSN 2161-7953. JSTOR 2213458. S2CID 246004883.
- Carrier, Richard (2008). "Réflexions sur l'efficacité militaire de l'armée des Alpes, 10–25 juin 1940". Revue historique des armées. 250: 85–93, in 25 paragraphs online. doi:10.3917/rha.250.0085. Archived from the original on 25 October 2014.
- Cliadakis, Harry (1974). "Neutrality and War in Italian Policy 1939–40". Journal of Contemporary History. 9 (3): 171–90. doi:10.1177/002200947400900307. S2CID 159593953.
- David, Daniel (2008). "Les fortifications alpines françaises: Bref historique des origines à la guerre franco-italienne de juin 1940". Revue historique des armées. 250: 4–15, in 20 paragraphs online. doi:10.3917/rha.250.0004. Archived from the original on 25 October 2014.
- Garraud, Philippe (2008). "Le rôle de l' " hypothèse Suisse " dans la défaite de 1940 ou comment une simple possibilité théorique a pu affecter la réalité". Guerres Mondiales et Conflits Contemporains. 230 (230 [2008/2]): 59–70. doi:10.3917/gmcc.230.0059.
- Garraud, Philippe (2015). "La construction de la ligne Maginot alpine et son emploi en 1940: un système défensif novateur et efficace". Guerres Mondiales et Conflits Contemporains. 259 (259 [2015/3]): 93–114. doi:10.3917/gmcc.259.0093.
- Harvey, A. D. (1990). "The French Armée de l'Air in May–June 1940: A Failure of Conception". Journal of Contemporary History. 25 (4): 447–65. doi:10.1177/002200949002500404. S2CID 159795712.
- Harvey, A. D. (2009). "The Bomber Offensive that Never Took Off". The Royal United Services Institute Journal. 154 (6): 96–102. doi:10.1080/03071840903533021. S2CID 152392664.
- Harvey, Stephen (1985). "The Italian War Effort and the Strategic Bombing of Italy". History. 70 (228): 32–45. doi:10.1111/j.1468-229x.1985.tb02478.x.
- Jensen, W. G. (1968). "The Importance of Energy in the First and Second World Wars". The Historical Journal. 11 (3): 538–54. doi:10.1017/s0018246x00001680. S2CID 159620220.
- K. W. (6 July 1940). "The Battle of Mentone". New Statesman and Nation. 20 (489): 11.
- Mallett, Robert (1997). "The Anglo-Italian War Trade Negotiations, Contraband Control and the Failure to Appease Mussolini, 1939–40". Diplomacy and Statecraft. 8 (1): 137–67. doi:10.1080/09592299708406033.
- Martin, Paul-É. (1945). "La défense de la Savoie et du Dauphiné par le groupement du général Cartier, Juin 1940". Revue militaire suisse. 9: 381–98. doi:10.5169/seals-342283.
- Miguet, André (1945). "La défense des Hautes-Alpes (11–25 juin 1940)". Bulletin de la Société d'études historiques, scientifiques et littéraires des Hautes-Alpes. 64: 315–97. Archived from the original on 15 October 2015.
- Packard, Reynolds (16 June 1940). "Italy Advances in French Alps, Rome Asserts". Pittsburgh Post-Gazette. Pittsburgh. p. 9. Archived from the original on 3 April 2016.
- Panicacci, Jean-Louis (1981). "Menton et les Mentonnais de 1939 à 1945" (PDF). Recherches Régionales, Archives Départementales des Alpes-Maritimes. 1: 1–43. Archived from the original (PDF) on 8 November 2014.
- Panicacci, Jean-Louis (2010). "La Battaglia per Mentone (10–24 giugno 1940) e l'occupazione italiana di Mentone" (PDF). Quaderni savonesi: Studi e ricerche sulla Resistenza e l'età contemporanea. 22: 13–21. Archived (PDF) from the original on 25 March 2019.
- Preston, Paul (1996). "Mussolini's Spanish Adventure: From Limited Risk to War". In Preston, Paul; MacKenzie, Ann (eds.). The Republic Besieged: Civil War in Spain, 1936–1939. Edinburgh University Press. pp. 21–52. ISBN 978-0-748-60861-4.
- Rochat, Giorgio (2008). "La campagne italienne de juin 1940 dans les Alpes occidentales". Revue historique des armées. 250. Translated by Pilloud, Anne: 77–84, in 29 paragraphs online. doi:10.3917/rha.250.0077. Archived from the original on 1 September 2017.
- Rochat, Giorgio (2010). "La campagna italiana sulle Alpi occidentali nel giugno 1940" (PDF). Quaderni savonesi: Studi e ricerche sulla Resistenza e l'età contemporanea. 22: 4–12.
- Sadkovich, James J. (1988). "Re-evaluating Who Won the Italo-British Naval Conflict, 1940–2". European History Quarterly. 18 (4): 455–71. doi:10.1177/026569148801800405. S2CID 143162826.
- Sadkovich, James J. (1989). "Understanding Defeat: Reappraising Italy's Role in World War II". Journal of Contemporary History. 24 (1): 27–61. doi:10.1177/002200948902400102. S2CID 161195027.
- Schreiber, Gerhard (1995). "Part I: Political and Military Developments in the Mediterranean Area, 1939–40". In Schreiber, Gerhard; Stegemann, Bernd; Vogel, Detlef (eds.). Germany and the Second World War, Volume III: The Mediterranean, South-East Europe, and North Africa 1939–1942. Oxford: Clarendon Press. pp. 5–302.
- Sica, Emanuele (2012). "June 1940: The Italian Army and the Battle of the Alps". Canadian Journal of History. 47 (2): 355–78. doi:10.3138/cjh.47.2.355.
- Smyth, Howard McGaw (1951). "The Command of the Italian Armed Forces in World War II". Military Affairs. 15 (1): 38–52. doi:10.2307/1982542. JSTOR 1982542.
- Thomas, Martin (1993). "Plans and Problems of the Armée de l'Air in the Defence of French North Africa before the Fall of France". French History. 7 (4): 472–95. doi:10.1093/fh/7.4.472.

=== Websites ===
- Leulliot, Nowfel (1999a). "Armée de l'Air: Order of Battle, 10th May 1940". France 1940. Nowfel Leulliot. Archived from the original on 16 April 2022.
- Leulliot, Nowfel (1999b). "Aéronautique Navale, Order of Battle, 5th June 1940 (Mediterranean zone only)". France 1940. Nowfel Leulliot.
- Leulliot, Nowfel (1999c). "Armée des Alpes, Order of Battle / Ordre de bataille, 10/05/1940". France 1940. Nowfel Leulliot. Archived from the original on 5 May 2015.
- Nafziger, George Francis (1997). "Italian Army, 10 June 1940" (PDF). United States Army Combined Arms Center. G. F. Nafziger. Archived (PDF) from the original on 23 September 2015.
- Nafziger, George Francis (1992). "French Army, 10 May 1940" (PDF). United States Army Combined Arms Center. G. F. Nafziger. Archived from the original (PDF) on 27 January 2017.
