= EETAA 722 =

French Air and Space Force training school

- École d’Enseignement Technique de l’Armée de l’Air 722
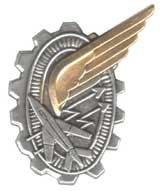
- Other name: arpète
- Motto in English: Honor, Work and Discipline
- Type: Military school (French Air and Space Force)
- Established: 1949
- Officer in charge: Colonelle Diane GERIBALDI
- Academic staff: 40
- Students: 400
- Location: Saintes, Charente-Maritime, Nouvelle-Aquitaine, France
- Campus: Paban
- Website: eetaa722.fr

EETAA 722 is the French acronym for École d'enseignement technique de l'Armée de l'air. It is a training school for mechanic apprentices of the French Air and Space Force. Its motto is "Honor, Work and Discipline".

Created in 1949 and located in Saintes, the school provides two years of demanding studies in Aviation and Aerospace.

Students are recruited from the tenth to 12th grade of high school through a national examination. Each year around 200 candidates are accepted and since 1999 it includes girls as well.

Students are aged from 16 to 18 and are nicknamed "arpètes”. They follow a rigorous training program for either the Baccalaureate or the certificate of professional aptitude (CAP, level V in National classification of levels of training (1969)).

The streams of study offered are:

- Baccalaureate in Sciences, option Engineering (SI)
- Technological Baccalaureate STI.2D - SIN (Science and Technology of Industry and Sustainable Development, specialty Information Systems and Digital).
- Baccalaureate in Aeronautics, specialty MSC (cell system mechanic);
- Certificate of Professional Aptitude "Aircraft Systems Electrician".

Upon graduation most students are admitted to Air Base 721 the next school in Rochefort for non-commissioned officers (NCOs) where they receive further specialized advanced technical training.

Some graduates of the sciences stream with option engineering may attend a preparatory class for the French Air Force Academy.
