= École de formation des sous-officiers de l'armée de l'air =

Air Base 721
- École de formation des sous-officiers de l'armée de l'air
- Former name: ETAA 721
- Motto: S'armer pour le futur
- Motto in English: Arm yourself for the future
- Type: Military school (French Air Force)
- Established: 1979
- Officer in charge: Brigadier General Alain Boullet
- Academic staff: 385
- Undergraduates: 6300
- Location: Rochefort, Nouvelle-Aquitaine, France
- Campus: Saint Agnant
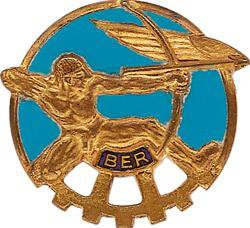

This is the training school for non-commissioned officers (NCO) of the French Air Force, recruited directly from the civilian life or the EETAA 722 school. This aeronautic establishment prepares tomorrow's task forces to quickly be dispatched in foreign military operations.

The school campus located south of Rochefort hosts on average 6,300 NCOs. It provides an initial military formation followed by an advanced technical training chosen among thirty streams in aeronautics such as: engine, structure, armament, embedded systems, logistics...etc... These courses last from 20 to 48 weeks and are open to all military corps using aerial equipment: French Army, French Navy and Gendarmerie. It's the largest military site of the Nouvelle-Aquitaine region.

Rochefort-Saint-Agnant
- IATA: RCO; ICAO: LFDN

Summary
- Airport type: Public/Military
- Owner: French Republic
- Operator: General Council of Charente-Maritime
- Location: Rochefort
- Built: 1980
- Elevation AMSL: 56 ft / 17 m
- Coordinates: 45°53′22″N 0°58′57″W

Map
- Location of Rochefort-Saint-Agnant, France

Runways
Direction	Length		Surface
Direction	ft	m	Surface
12/30	7,480	2,280	Asphalt
12/30	2,723	830	Grass

== References and external links ==
- Sous -officiers de l'armée de l'air
- Chant de l'EFSOAA
- Ecole de formation des sous-officiers de l'Armée de l'Air (EFSOAA)
