= Équipe de Voltige de l'Armée de l'Air =

Air Force Aerobatics Display Team
- Équipe de Voltige de l’Armée de l’Air
- Country: France
- Branch: Armée de l'air et de l'espace
- Type: Trainer aircraft
- Role: Air Force Aerobatics Display Team
- Garrison/HQ: Salon-de-Provence Air Base

Aircraft flown
- Extra EA-300

Équipe de Voltige de l'Armée de l'Air is a French Air and Space Force (Armée de l'air et de l'espace) Air Force Aerobatics Display Team located at Salon-de-Provence Air Base, Bouches-du-Rhône, France which operates the Extra EA-300.

== See also ==
- List of French Air and Space Force aircraft squadrons
