= Salon-de-Provence Air Base =

Salon-de-Provence Air Base Base aérienne 701 Salon-de-Provence Advanced Landing Ground (ALG) Y-16

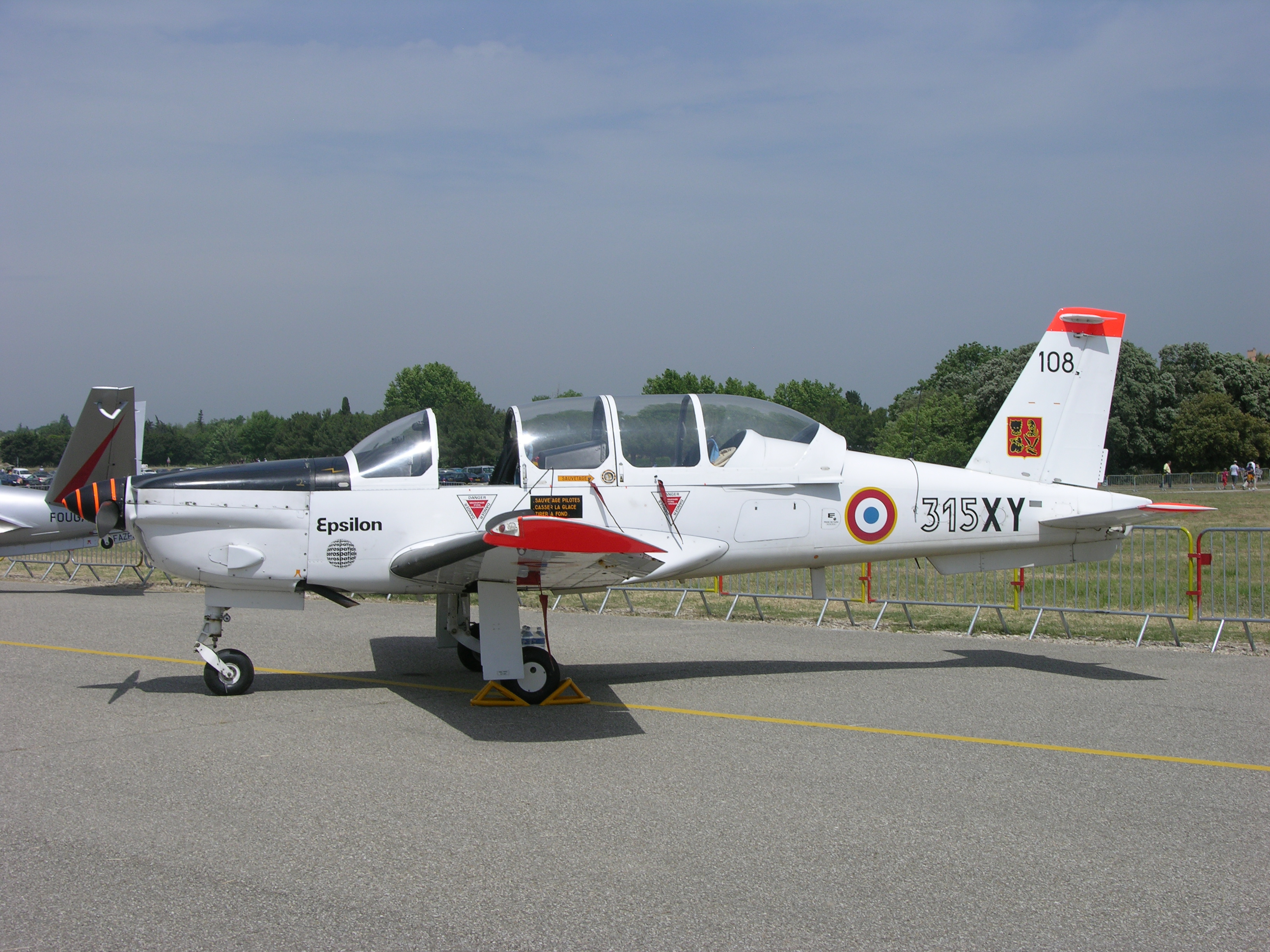
- Socata TB 30 Epsilon trainer, Salon-de-Provence, 2007
- IATA: None; ICAO: LFMY

Summary
- Airport type: Military
- Owner: Government of France
- Operator: Armée de l'air et de l'espace
- Location: Salon-de-Provence, Bouches-du-Rhône
- Elevation AMSL: 194 ft / 59 m
- Coordinates: 43°36′23″N 005°06′33″E

Map
- Location of Salon-de-Provence Air Base, France

Runways
Direction	Length		Surface
Direction	m	ft	Surface
16/34	2,001	6,565	Concrete
- Source: Aerodrome chart at Direction de la Circulation Aerienne Militaire (DIRCAM)

Salon-de-Provence Air Base (French: Base aérienne 701 Salon-de-Provence or BA 701) (ICAO: LFMY) is a base of the French Air and Space Force (Armée de l'air et de l'espace) located 4 km (2.5 mi) south Salon-de-Provence, Bouches-du-Rhône in southern France.

== Overview ==
It hosts the training facilities for the officers of the air force:

- Patrouille de France
- Équipe de Voltige de l’Armée de l’Air
- Escadron de Formation des Navigateurs de Combat 1/93
- Centre de Formation à l'Aéronautique Militaire Initiale 5/312
- Escadron D'Instruction en Vol 3/5 Comtat Venaissin
- Escadron D'Instruction en Vol 2/93 Cévennes
- Escadron D'Instruction au vol à Voile Sainte Victoire
- École de l'air: for young students
  - pilot commissioned officers
  - mechanics commissioned officers
  - air base commissioned officers
- École militaire de l'Air: gives access to the same careers as the École de l'Air, for non-commissioned officers who want to become commissioned officers
- air commissary school
- special course of the École de l'Air: for foreign officers
- special course of formation of officers

In addition, it hosts a school of the French Navy: the school of Naval Aviation (EAN).

== World War II ==
Salon-de-Provence Air Base is a pre-World War II airfield, which was used by the Armée de l'Air during the early part of the war. It was briefly a base for RAF Bomber Command Vickers Wellingtons, which were sent to Salon from England, for raids on the Italian port of Genoa, as a part of Operation Haddock. After the 1940 Battle of France and the June Armistice with Nazi Germany, it became part of the limited (French: Armée de l'Air de Vichy) air force of the Vichy Government. Known Vichy units at Salon-de-Provence were:

- G.C. I/6 (1) Morane-Saulnier M.S.406 fighters
- G.C. III/9 Bloch MB.152 fighters

On 11 November 1942, Salon-de-Provence Air Base was seized by Nazi forces as part of Case Anton, the occupation of Vichy and the Luftwaffe took control of the base. Under German control, the base became a bomber airfield for anti-shipping operations over the Mediterranean against American Convoys, and later, attacking Allied forces on Corsica and Sardinia after their capture from Italian forces (Regio Esercito) during 1943. Known units assigned were:

- Kampfgeschwader 100 (KG 100), flying Heinkel He 111Hs, February–April 1943
- Kampfgeschwader 26 (KG 26), flying Heinkel He 111Hs, May 1943-March 1944
- Zerstörergeschwader 1 (ZG 1), flying Messerschmitt Bf 110s, May 1944

Primarily air defense against Twelfth Air Force Martin B-26 Marauder medium bomber attacks on Southern France

- Kampfgeschwader 77 (KG 77), flying Junkers Ju 88s, June–July 1944.

It was attacked on several missions by Allied bombers based in England while under German control. The airfield was sized by Allied Forces in August 1944 during Operation Dragoon, the Invasion of Southern France in August 1944 and was repaired and placed into operational use by the United States Army Air Forces XII Engineer Command, being turned over to Twelfth Air Force on 28 August 1944. It was designated as Advanced Landing Ground "Y-16 Salon".

Twelfth Air Force stationed the 27th Fighter Squadron at the repaired field from 30 August, flying A-36 Apaches until moving north into eastern France in October. Also the 47th Bombardment Group flew A-20 Havoc light bombers from the field during September.

The use by American forces of the airfield was brief, and on 20 November 1944 it was returned to French control.

== See also ==
- Advanced Landing Ground
