= Haddock Force =

Ad hoc force of the Royal Air Force

- Part of the Battle of France
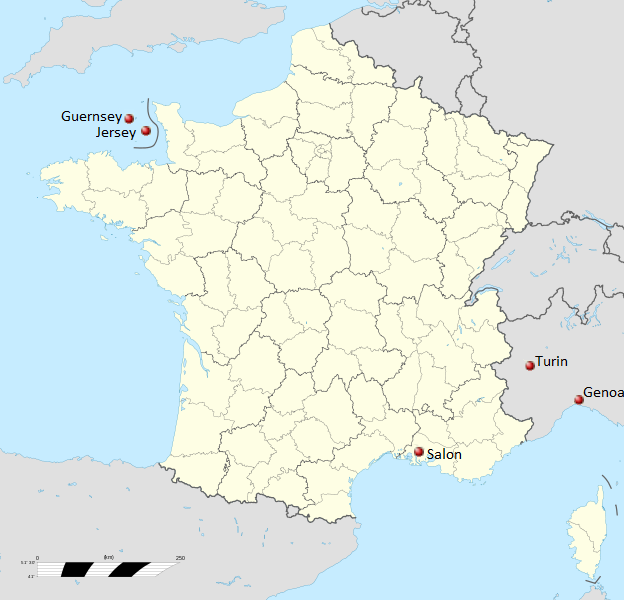
- Map showing the location of bases in the Channel Islands and at Salon and the target cities of Turin and Genoa
- Type: Bombing campaign
- Location: Salon, France; 43°36′23″N 005°06′33″E
- Objective: Disruption of the Italian war economy
- Date: 11–17 June 1940
- Executed by: RAF Bomber Command
- Outcome: Operational failure

Haddock Force was the name given to a number of Royal Air Force bombers dispatched to airfields in southern France to bomb northern Italian industrial targets if Italy declared war, which was thought to be imminent. Italy entered the Second World War on 10 June 1940 and the plan was put into effect but at first, the local French authorities prevented the RAF Wellington bombers from taking off. Whitleys flying from England via the Channel Islands made the first raid on the night of 11/12 June 1940.

After negotiations between the French and British governments and directives from Paris to the authorities in the south of France, the Wellingtons flew back. Operations commenced on the night of 14/15 June but all but one of the eight bombers returned without bombing due to bad weather. Eight Wellington crews tried again the next night and six claimed to have bombed Milan; the raid was the last by RAF Bomber Command from French bases until 1944.

== Background ==
Wireless decrypts by the Government Code and Cypher School at Bletchley Park gave the Allies about a month's notice of an Italian declaration of war. The Battle of France was nearing its final phase when intelligence reports suggested that Italy was on the brink of entering the war on the side of her Axis partner, Germany. There were few resources available to Britain which could be used to support France against the Italians, with the exception of Royal Air Force (RAF) Bomber Command. The Supreme War Council resolved on 31 May that if war was declared, industrial targets and oil plants in the northern Italian cities of Turin and Genoa, were to be attacked as soon as possible.

Whitley bombers could reach their targets from the Channel Islands, while the shorter-ranged Wellingtons would have to refuel in the south of France. The French Air Command made available the airfield outside Marseille at Salon-de-Provence and another one nearby. The headquarters of 71 Wing was sent to the Marseille area on 3 June to prepare reception and refuelling facilities for the British bombers, which were ready on the outbreak of war on 10 June. The Chief of the Air Staff, Cyril Newall noted that the servicing units needed by aircraft reinforcements from Britain to counter the German offensive anticipated in early June were reserved for Haddock, waiting to attack Italy the moment war was declared.

== Operations ==
=== 11–17 June ===
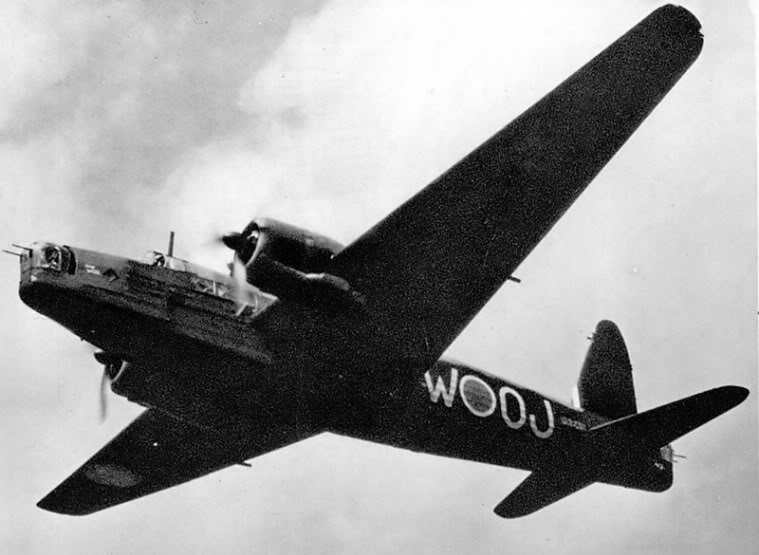
A Vickers Wellington Mk IC bomber of 149 Squadron RAF in 1940.

Italy declared war at midnight on 10 June 1940 and a detachment of Wellingtons from 99 Squadron, part of 3 Group, Bomber Command, left England for France and arrived at Salon at 15:30 hours on 11 June. French fighters based near the Italian border had been sent north against the Luftwaffe and despite the agreement to attack Italy, the French civilian authorities decided that bombing Italy would provoke attacks on the huge petrol dumps on the Étang de Berre, 25 km (16 mi) north-west of Marseille; retaliation against civilians could only fall on French cities and was to be avoided.

General Jean Laurens, the commander of Zone d'opérations aériennes des Alpes (ZOAA) asserted that the French government opposed the raid and refused to allow the attack from bases under his command. While the bombers were refuelling, the force commander, Group Captain R. M. Field, received a telephone call from the commander of the local French bomber group, who told him that Italian targets were not to be attacked. Shortly afterwards, Field received orders from the Air Ministry in London that the aircraft should take off as planned. There was a flurry of telephone calls from various French authorities, culminating in a call at 9:45 p.m. from the Commander in Chief of the French Air Force, (général d'armée aérienne) Joseph Vuillemin to the headquarters of British Air Forces in France (BAFF, Air Marshal Arthur Barratt).

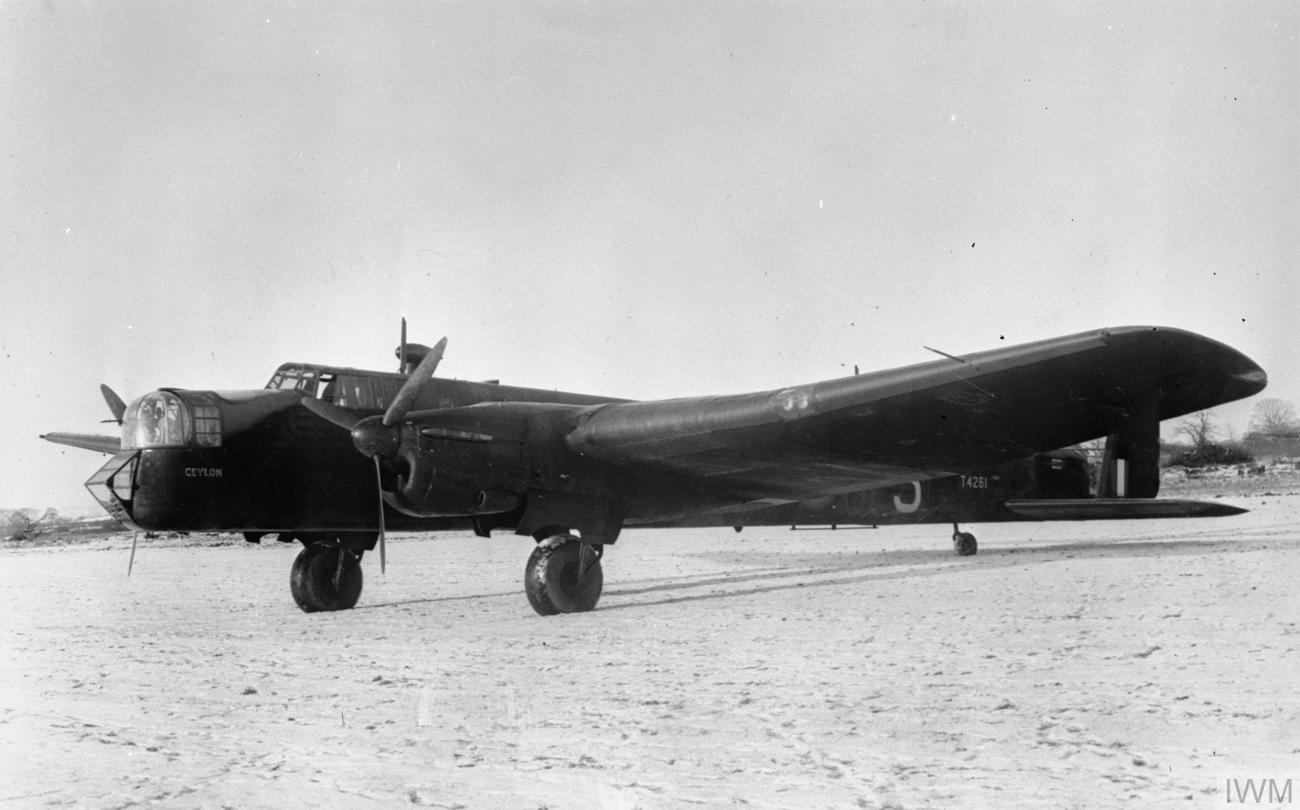
A Whitley Mark V bomber of 102 Squadron.

Field followed the orders from the Air Ministry in Britain and those from Barratt in the evening. Around 0:30 a.m. as the first Wellington taxied into position for take-off, French troops blocked the runway with a line of lorries and carts; Field had no choice but to abort the mission and most of the Wellingtons returned to England the next day. On the evening of 11 June, the British diplomatic representatives in France heard that the French had stopped the British bombers from taking off from Salon and after strong protests Paul Reynaud, the French prime minister, agreed to order the French authorities to co-operate.

From England, 4 Group sent 36 Whitleys from 10 Squadron, 51 Squadron, 58 Squadron, 77 Squadron and 102 Squadron. The Whitleys refuelled at the advanced bases on Jersey and Guernsey and flew to Italy. Severe storms and icing caused the majority of the aircraft to turn back and only 13 reached their targets at Turin and Genoa; two aircraft failed to return. Several bombers hit Geneva and Lausanne in Switzerland, 115 mi (185 km) from their targets, killing four civilians and wounding another eighty. (Note: In 1974, Robert Jackson wrote that ten Whitleys bombed the main target and two the secondary; 23 aircraft returned without bombing and one Whitley was lost.) After representations by both governments, the French authorities finally consented to raids on Italy after Toulon was bombed; six Wellingtons each from 99 Squadron and 149 Squadron returned to the south of France. Eight aircraft left on the evening of 15 June to bomb the Ansaldo works at Genoa. Thunderstorms made navigation difficult; only one aircraft arrived over the target and the rest returned with their bombs. The following night, another attempt was made by nine Wellingtons but only five reached their objective. (Note: In 1974, Robert Jackson wrote that eight aircraft flew on the raid and six crews claimed to have bombed the target.) The French armistice negotiations prevented further operations; British bombers did not fly from France again until 1944.

== Aftermath ==
In 2016, Greg Baughen wrote that after the loss of the Allied armies in northern France in May, Churchill accepted the view that such British military assistance available for France would be inadequate to influence the course of the campaign. Britain should send only the minimum consistent with boosting French morale. The effect of bombers on the ground battle was judged pointless, regardless of the example set by the Luftwaffe and attacks on strategic targets were judged to be a better choice. Churchill insisted that once the German offensive began, the RAF should resume direct support of the Allied armies. The Chief of the Air Staff, Cyril Newall, gave an indication of British priorities when he claimed that the servicing units in France needed by any aircraft reinforcements were already committed to Haddock. Preparing a token effort against a hypothetical enemy, when the French were making a final effort to resist Fall Rot, the German offensive over the Somme and Aisne rivers, could hardly have been seen as important by the French.
