= Arc (Savoie) =

River in France

- The Arc near Aussois, Savoie

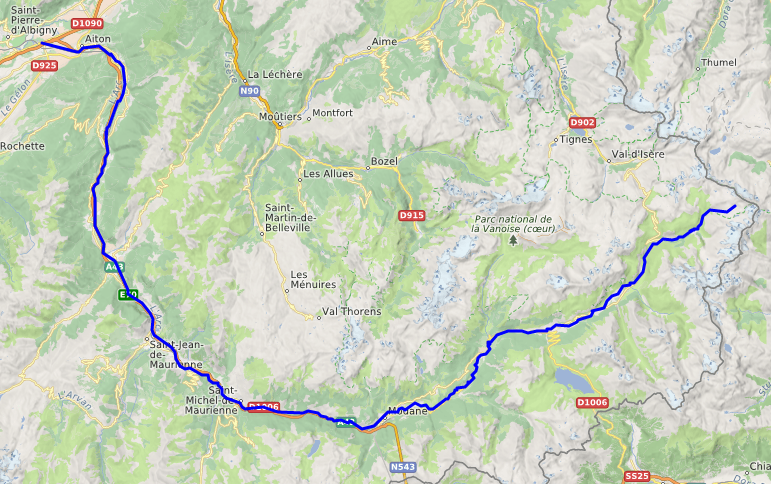

Physical characteristics
- Source
  - location: Graian Alps
  - elevation: 2,760 m (9,060 ft)
- Mouth
  - location: Isère
  - coordinates: 45°33′46″N 6°12′13″E
- Length: 127 km (79 mi)

Basin features
- Progression: Isère→ Rhône→ Mediterranean Sea

The Arc (French pronunciation: [aʁk]) is a 127-kilometre-long (79 mi) river in the Savoie département of south-eastern France. It is a left tributary of the Isère, which it joins at Chamousset, approximately 15 km (9.3 mi) downstream from Albertville. Its source is near the border with Italy, in the Graian Alps, northeast of Bonneval-sur-Arc. The valley of the Arc, the Maurienne, is an important transport artery between France and Italy.

== Towns crossed by the river ==
- Bonneval-sur-Arc
- Bessans
- Lanslevillard
- Lanslebourg-Mont-Cenis
- Termignon
- Sollières-Sardières
- Bramans
- Avrieux
- Villarodin-Bourget
- Modane
- Fourneaux
- Freney
- Saint-Michel-de-Maurienne
- Saint-Martin-de-la-Porte
- Saint-Julien-Mont-Denis
- Villargondran
- Saint-Jean-de-Maurienne
- La Chambre
- Épierre
- Argentine
- Aiguebelle
- Aiton

== See also ==
- Arc (Provence), a river in southern France.
- List of rivers of France
