= Lanslevillard =

Lanslevillard Lô Vlâr (Savoyard)
- Part of Val-Cenis
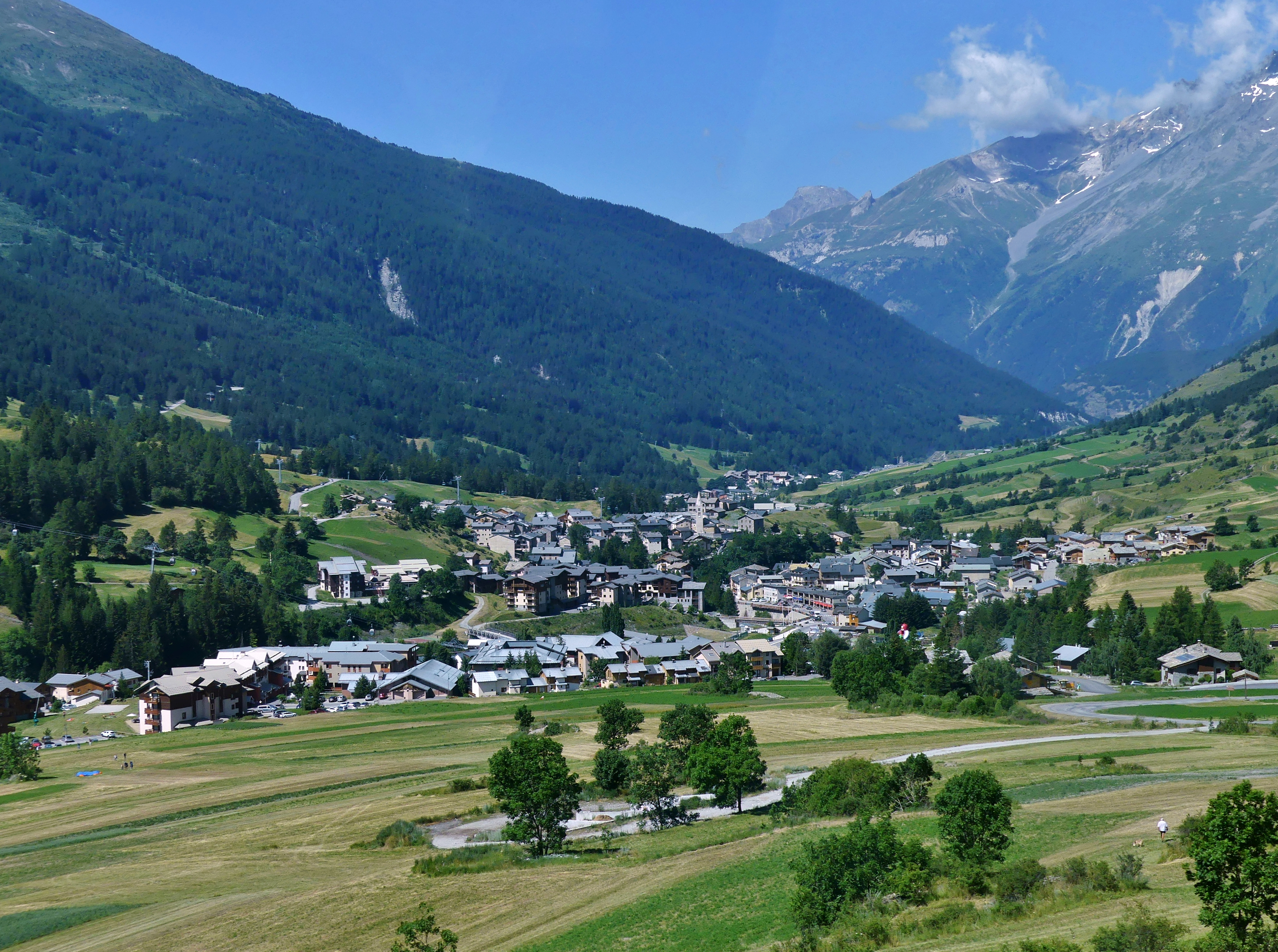
- Landscape of Lanslevillard in summer.
- Location of Lanslevillard
- Location within France Location within Auvergne-Rhône-Alpes
- Coordinates: 45°17′25″N 6°54′44″E
- Country: France
- Region: Auvergne-Rhône-Alpes
- Department: Savoie
- Arrondissement: Saint-Jean-de-Maurienne
- Canton: Modane
- Commune: Val-Cenis
- Area^{1}: 39.84 km^{2} (15.38 sq mi)
- Highest elevation: 3,560 m (11,680 ft)
- Lowest elevation: 1,439 m (4,721 ft)
- Population (2022): 465
  - Density: 11.7/km^{2} (30.2/sq mi)
- Time zone: UTC+01:00 (CET)
  - Summer (DST): UTC+02:00 (CEST)
- Postal code: 73480
- ^{1} French Land Register data, which excludes lakes, ponds, glaciers > 1 km^{2} (0.386 sq mi or 247 acres) and river estuaries.

Lanslevillard (Savoyard: Lô Vlâr) is a former commune in the Savoie department in the Auvergne-Rhône-Alpes region in south-eastern France. Part of its territory is home to the Val Cenis Vanoise ski resort. On 1 January 2017, it was merged with the former communes Bramans, Lanslebourg-Mont-Cenis, Sollières-Sardières and Termignon into the new commune Val-Cenis.

== Geography ==
The village of Lanslevillard is situated at an altitude of 1,480 m (4,860 ft), at the foot of the Mont Cenis pass, in Haute Maurienne, to the south of the Vanoise mountain range and 26 km (16 mi) north east of Modane.

The Arc river flows through the village.

== Place name ==
According to the Canon Adolphe Gros, the name of the commune and parish of Lanslevillard stems from the surname Lanzo, Lanz or Lans. Another possibility is Lancius. The addition of the title Le villard - from the Latin villaris, villare, meaning a house in the country - to Lans seems to have been done in order to distinguish the parish from that of Lanslebourg. Around the 12th C these two parishes were one and the same.

As early as 1093 there is mention of the parish as In superiori Lancio, or Ecclesia de Lanzo superiore in 1126. In 1151 it is cited as Ecclesia de Villario, then Ecclesia de superiori Lancio in 1204 and 1233. Le Villar(d) was therefore added sometime after the 12th C. At the end of the 13th C, the parish is designated as Magiester Joannes de Lancio Villario (1293). In the 14th C it becomes Curatus Lancei Villaris or Parrochia Lancei Villaris in Mauriana (1357). It is only in the 16th C that the modern form of Lanslevillard, or sometimes a derivative, Lanslevilar, sometimes written Lans-Le-Villard, appears.

In francoprovençal, the name of the commune is written Lô Vlâr or Vêlard.

== History ==
Human presence in Maurienne and Lanslevillard can be traced back as far as the La Tène period, specifically with the presence of a burial site in the l'Adroit locality. There are many examples of rock art in the communes of Termignon, Lanslebourg, Lanslevilalrd and Bessans, especially around the Grand roc noir rock carving site. The territory of the Lanslevillard commune is home to two rocks bearing cup and ring marks, classed as historical monuments (Monuments historiques) since 1911:

- the Pierre aux Pieds (the Foot Rock), situated at an altitude of 2,750 m (9,020 ft) on the Pisselerand plateau, on which around fifty cup marks and thirty carved human foot prints can be seen.
- the Pierre de Chantelouve or Pierre des Saints, situated at an altitude of 2,100 m (6,900 ft), on which 150 cup marks can be seen.

Before the Roman conquest, the upper valley of the Maurienne was populated principally by the Medulli people from as early as the 3rd century BCE. They were finally conquered in 16 BCE and integrated into the Roman empire. The Romans subsequently built the Via Francigena, connecting Canterbury to Rome, which passed over the Mont Cenis pass.

During the French Revolutionary period, French troops invaded Savoie. General Sarret moved up the Maurienne right to the head of the valley in April 1794. He was then stopped by savoyard soldiers loyal to the Maison de Savoie. This military victory caused an outpouring of joy in the villages of Lanslevillard and Lanslebourg, and, in reaction to the hostility of the Mauriennais, the revolutionary army deported the inhabitants to Fort-Barraux (Barraux) on the 19th and 20 April 1794. They were returned home on the 2nd of July.

In the past, it was impossible to take the Mont Cenis pass without the help of a "Marron", a local guide who helped travelers along the sinuous paths to Italy in all weather. Nowadays, walkers can still make their way up to the pass via the "chemin de la Ramasse", the same path that the "Marrons' once used.

In 1812, doctor Balthazard Claraz saved the life of Pope Pius VII at the Mont-Cenis hospice, as the Pope was being secretly transferred from Savona to Fontainebleau, where he would remain prisoner from the 20th of June 1812 to the 23 of January 1814.

During the Second World War, the Germans occupied the village, and burned most of it to the ground upon pulling out. The only surviving parts of the original village are the church, the school house and some of the houses surrounding these two buildings.

== See also ==
- Communes of the Savoie department
