= Val Cenis Vanoise =

Ski resort in Haute-Maurienne, France

Val Cenis
- Location within Alps
- Coordinates: 45°17′N 6°54′E
- Top elevation: 2,730 m (8,960 ft)
- Base elevation: 1,300 m (4,300 ft)
- Trails: 56
- Total length: 125 km (78 mi)
- Lift system: 26
- Website: www.haute-maurienne-vanoise.com

Val Cenis is a ski and mountain resort situated in the Haute-Maurienne region of the French Alps, close to the Italian border. It is composed of five villages; Lanslebourg, Lanslevillard, Termignon, Sollières-Sardières and Bramans. The villages sit between 1200m and 1500m, respectively, and lifts climb to a maximum altitude of 2740m. The resort is not very well known due to its location at the end of a valley and difficulty of access and attracts a mainly French, Italian, Belgian and Dutch contingent each winter. It is a lot quieter than larger ski resorts in the French Alps and does not normally suffer from long lift queues. It is ideally located in the Maurienne region with good transport links in and out of Modane, Lyon, Geneva and Chambery.

At the top of the mountain lays Lac du Mont Cenis; in the summer or the winter this is a delightful sight. In the winter the lake freezes and allows for beautiful pictures from the Canopée des Cîmes, a suspended boat shaped platform.

== Skiing ==
Val Cenis ski area cover Termignon, Lanslebourg and Lanslevillard. It is open to skiers and snowboarders from December to April each year. It has terrain to cater for all abilities, although is perhaps more suited to intermediates than anyone else. There are 9 green runs, 10 blue runs, 18 red runs, and 6 black runs, as well as 2 gondolas, 10 chairlifts, and 8 drag lifts.

One of the major attractions of Val Cenis is the existence of blue pistes from top to bottom, which allows beginners to enjoy the heights of the mountain which they may not be able to reach at other resorts. Amongst its pistes Val Cenis boasts the longest green run in Europe; the 10km l'Escargot, which doubles as a road in summer, winds down from 2100m to 1400m.

The lower section of the slopes are through trees, which means they are not exposed to wind and sun and tend to have better snow cover, although the scope for off-piste skiing is limited. Above the trees, from 2100m upwards, there is an abundance of off-piste skiing to be found. Impressive backcountry skiing can be found past the slopes at the Lanslevillard end of the resort, with several wide gullies within a large forested area. From the top of the TSF4 de la Met lift to 2800m there are panoramic views of the Lac du Mont Cenis almost 800m below, as well as several pistes running down to the lake's shore.

There is now even more skiing available from Val Cenis as the resort makes one with neighbouring Termignon offering 125km of pistes.

The Eski-Mo pass includes Val frejus, Aussois, la Norma, Val Cenis and Bonneval sur arc, the exclusive chocolate box ski resort And Bessans is an eldorado for cross country and biathlon on the highest altiplano of Maurienne.
