= Val-Cenis =

- Commune
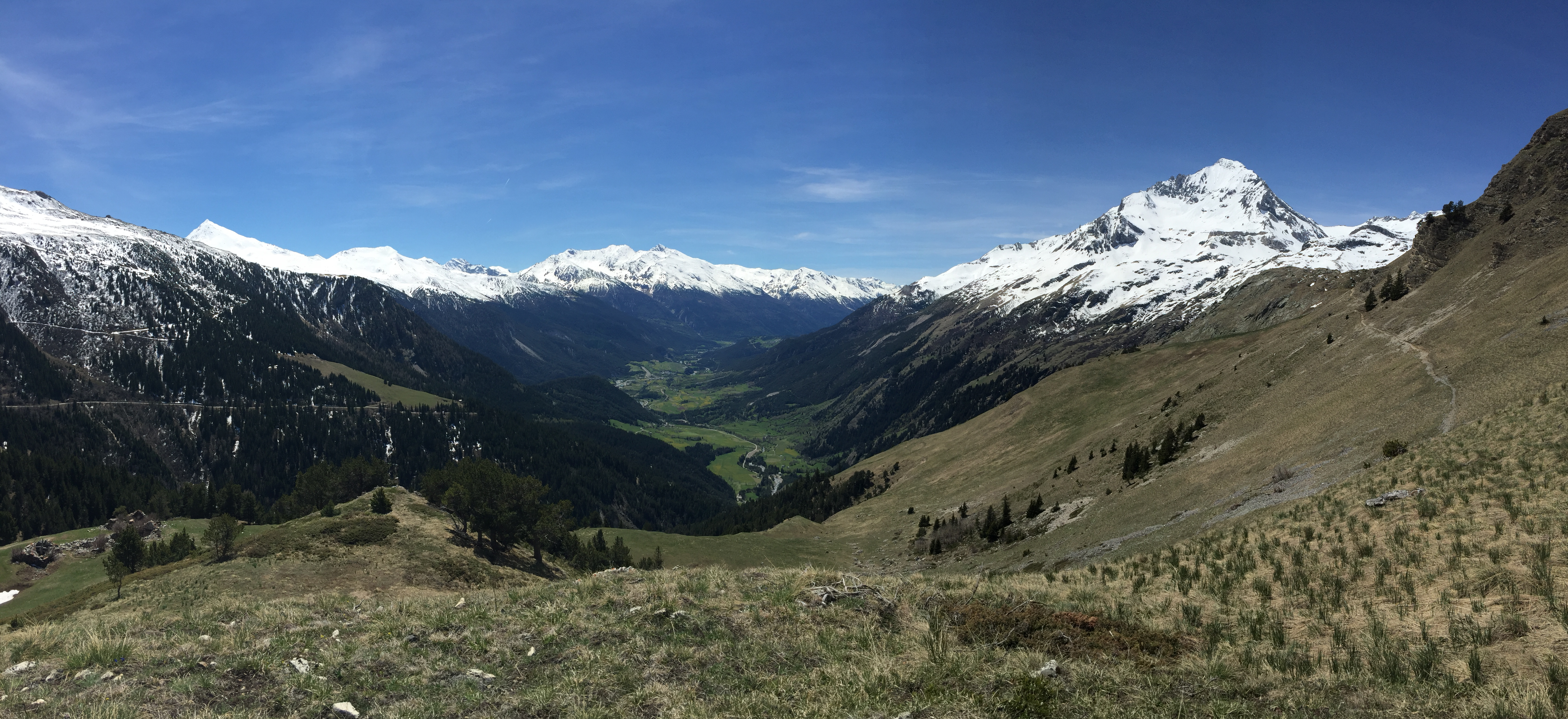
- View of Val-Cenis
- Location of Val-Cenis
- Location within France Location within Auvergne-Rhône-Alpes
- Coordinates: 45°16′41″N 6°49′05″E
- Country: France
- Region: Auvergne-Rhône-Alpes
- Department: Savoie
- Arrondissement: Saint-Jean-de-Maurienne
- Canton: Modane
- Intercommunality: Haute Maurienne-Vanoise

Government
  - Mayor (2020–2026): Jacques Arnoux
- Area^{1}: 408.05 km^{2} (157.55 sq mi)
- Population (2023): 2,112
  - Density: 5.176/km^{2} (13.41/sq mi)
- Time zone: UTC+01:00 (CET)
  - Summer (DST): UTC+02:00 (CEST)
- INSEE/Postal code: 73290 /73500
- ^{1} French Land Register data, which excludes lakes, ponds, glaciers > 1 km^{2} (0.386 sq mi or 247 acres) and river estuaries.

Val-Cenis is a commune in the department of Savoie, southeastern France. The municipality was established on 1 January 2017 by merger of the former communes of Termignon (the seat), Bramans, Lanslebourg-Mont-Cenis, Lanslevillard and Sollières-Sardières.

== Geography ==
=== Climate ===
Val-Cenis has a subarctic climate (Köppen climate classification Dfc). The average annual temperature in Val-Cenis is 3.0 °C (37.4 °F). The average annual rainfall is 890.2 mm (35.05 in) with May as the wettest month. The temperatures are highest on average in July, at around 11.8 °C (53.2 °F), and lowest in February, at around −4.4 °C (24.1 °F). The highest temperature ever recorded in Val-Cenis was 26.0 °C (78.8 °F) on 30 July 1983; the coldest temperature ever recorded was −25.0 °C (−13.0 °F) on 11 February 1986.

Climate data for Val-Cenis (Lanslebourg-Mont-Cenis, altitude 2000m, 1981–2010 normals, extremes 1971–2014)
Month	Jan	Feb	Mar	Apr	May	Jun	Jul	Aug	Sep	Oct	Nov	Dec	Year
Record high °C (°F)	13.0 (55.4)	14.5 (58.1)	16.5 (61.7)	18.0 (64.4)	22.8 (73.0)	24.0 (75.2)	26.0 (78.8)	25.0 (77.0)	22.9 (73.2)	19.7 (67.5)	16.8 (62.2)	14.0 (57.2)	26.0 (78.8)
Mean daily maximum °C (°F)	−1.1 (30.0)	−1.4 (29.5)	0.8 (33.4)	2.9 (37.2)	8.1 (46.6)	12.6 (54.7)	15.4 (59.7)	15.0 (59.0)	11.0 (51.8)	7.0 (44.6)	1.9 (35.4)	−0.5 (31.1)	6.0 (42.8)
Daily mean °C (°F)	−4.0 (24.8)	−4.4 (24.1)	−2.2 (28.0)	0.1 (32.2)	5.0 (41.0)	9.1 (48.4)	11.8 (53.2)	11.6 (52.9)	7.9 (46.2)	4.2 (39.6)	−0.7 (30.7)	−3.3 (26.1)	3.0 (37.4)
Mean daily minimum °C (°F)	−6.9 (19.6)	−7.3 (18.9)	−5.3 (22.5)	−2.7 (27.1)	2.0 (35.6)	5.6 (42.1)	8.2 (46.8)	8.2 (46.8)	4.9 (40.8)	1.5 (34.7)	−3.2 (26.2)	−6.1 (21.0)	−0.1 (31.8)
Record low °C (°F)	−25.0 (−13.0)	−25.0 (−13.0)	−22.0 (−7.6)	−14.0 (6.8)	−9.2 (15.4)	−4.6 (23.7)	−1.5 (29.3)	−3.0 (26.6)	−6.5 (20.3)	−9.9 (14.2)	−18.0 (−0.4)	−21.0 (−5.8)	−25.0 (−13.0)
Average precipitation mm (inches)	42.9 (1.69)	33.9 (1.33)	46.9 (1.85)	62.4 (2.46)	122.5 (4.82)	97.7 (3.85)	64.6 (2.54)	83.3 (3.28)	113.6 (4.47)	106.8 (4.20)	68.6 (2.70)	47.0 (1.85)	890.2 (35.05)
Average precipitation days (≥ 1.0 mm)	6.9	6.0	7.3	9.4	11.8	9.8	7.9	8.5	8.5	9.1	8.2	7.1	100.5
Source: Météo-France

== Population ==
Population data refer to the area corresponding with the commune as of January 2025.

Historical population
Year	Pop.	±% p.a.
1968	2,876	—
1975	1,539	−8.55%
1982	1,712	+1.53%
1990	1,908	+1.36%
1999	2,021	+0.64%
2007	2,052	+0.19%
2012	2,110	+0.56%
2017	2,088	−0.21%
2023	2,112	+0.19%
Source: INSEE

== Gallery ==
Nature and landscapes

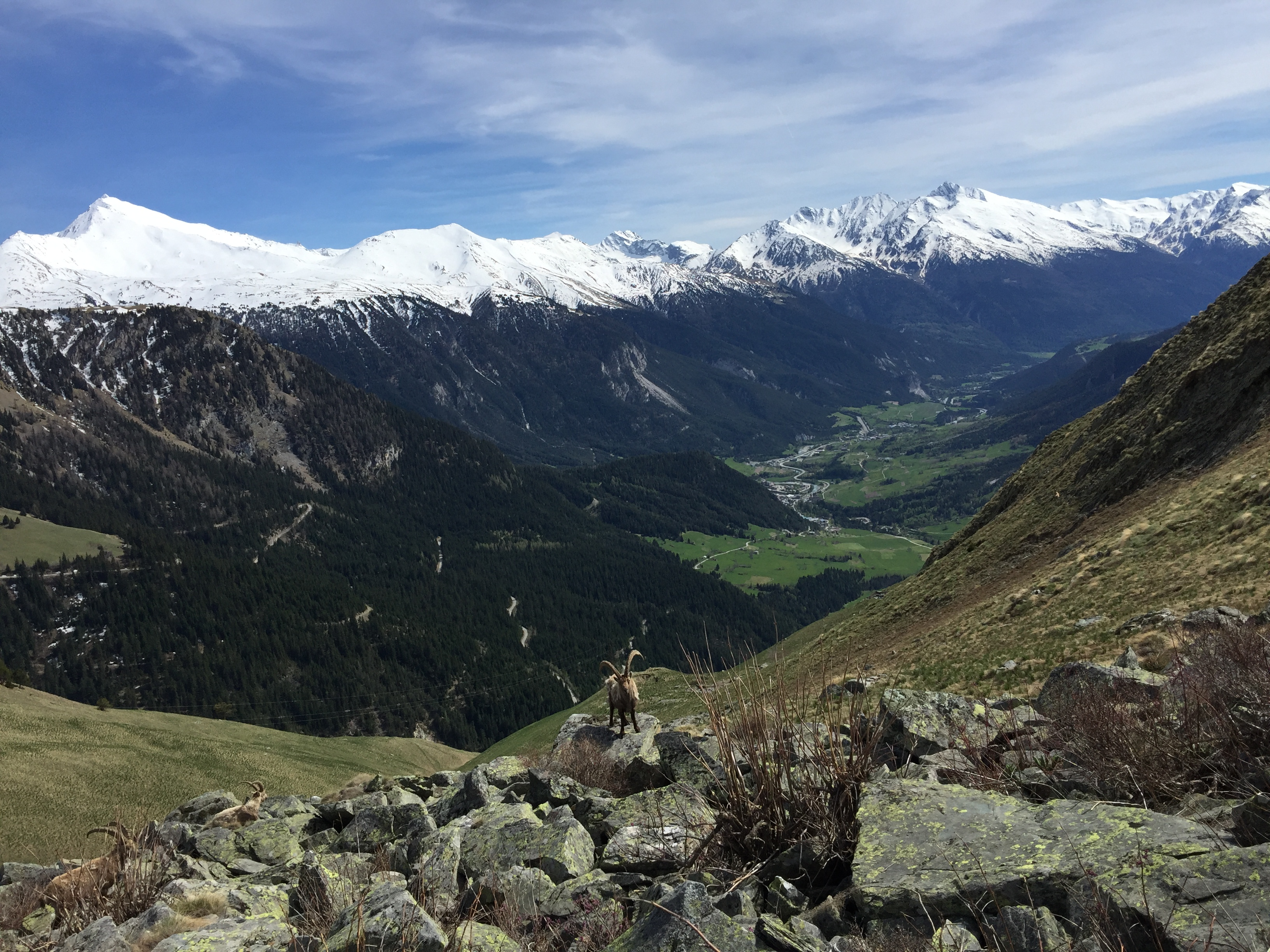
The commune lies at the limit of the Vanoise National Park

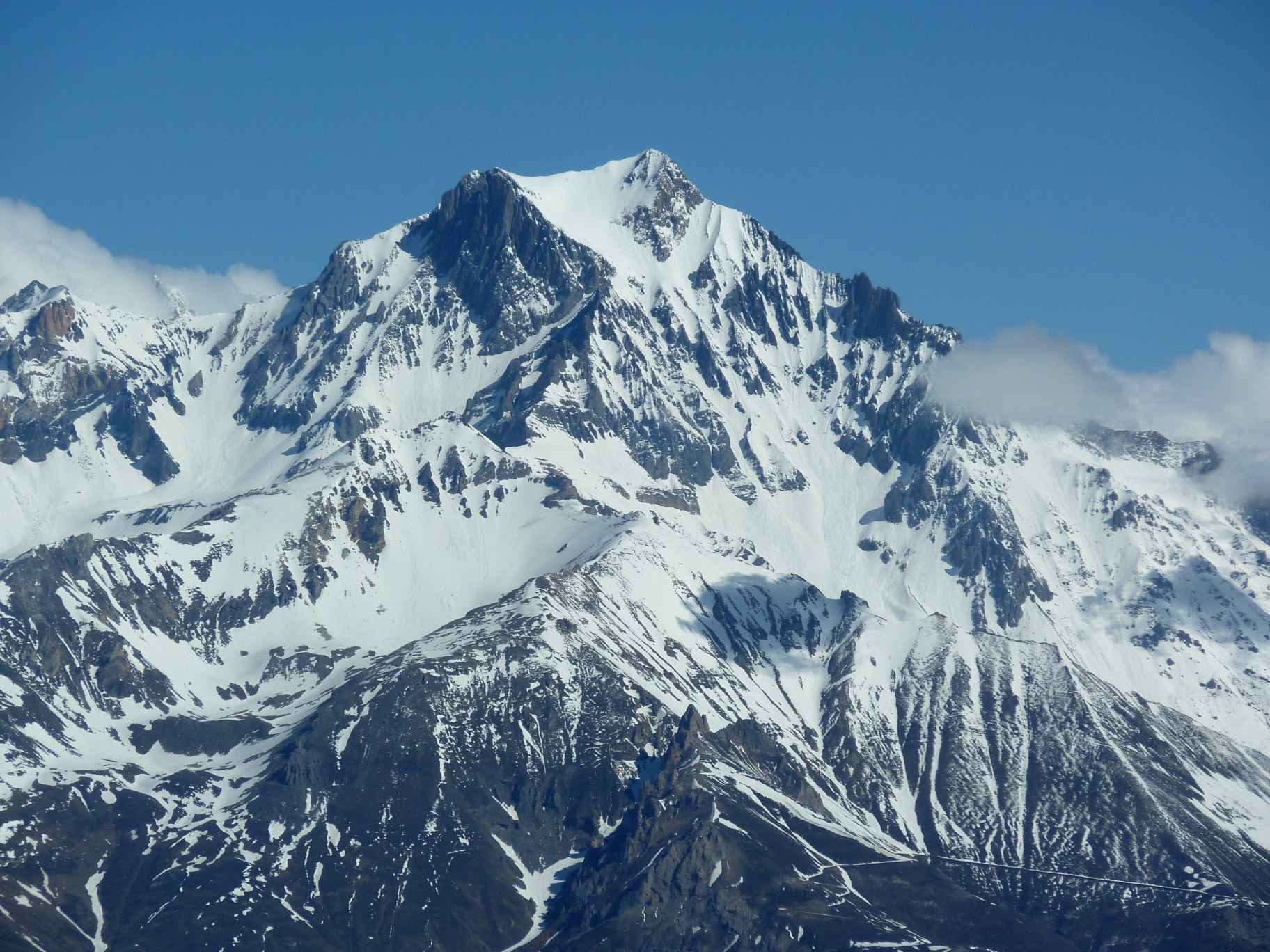
The Dent Parrachée

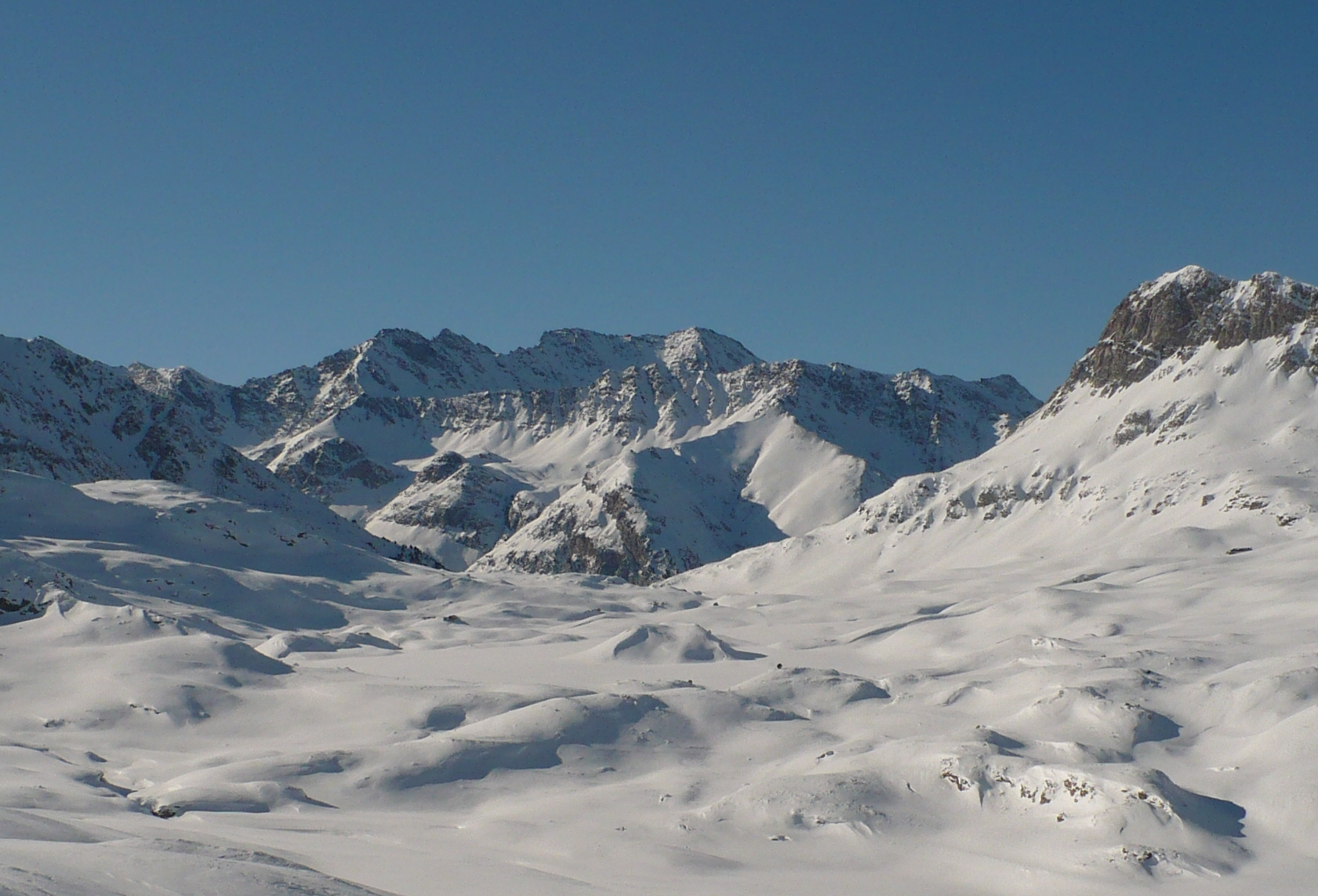
Petit Mont Cenis Pass

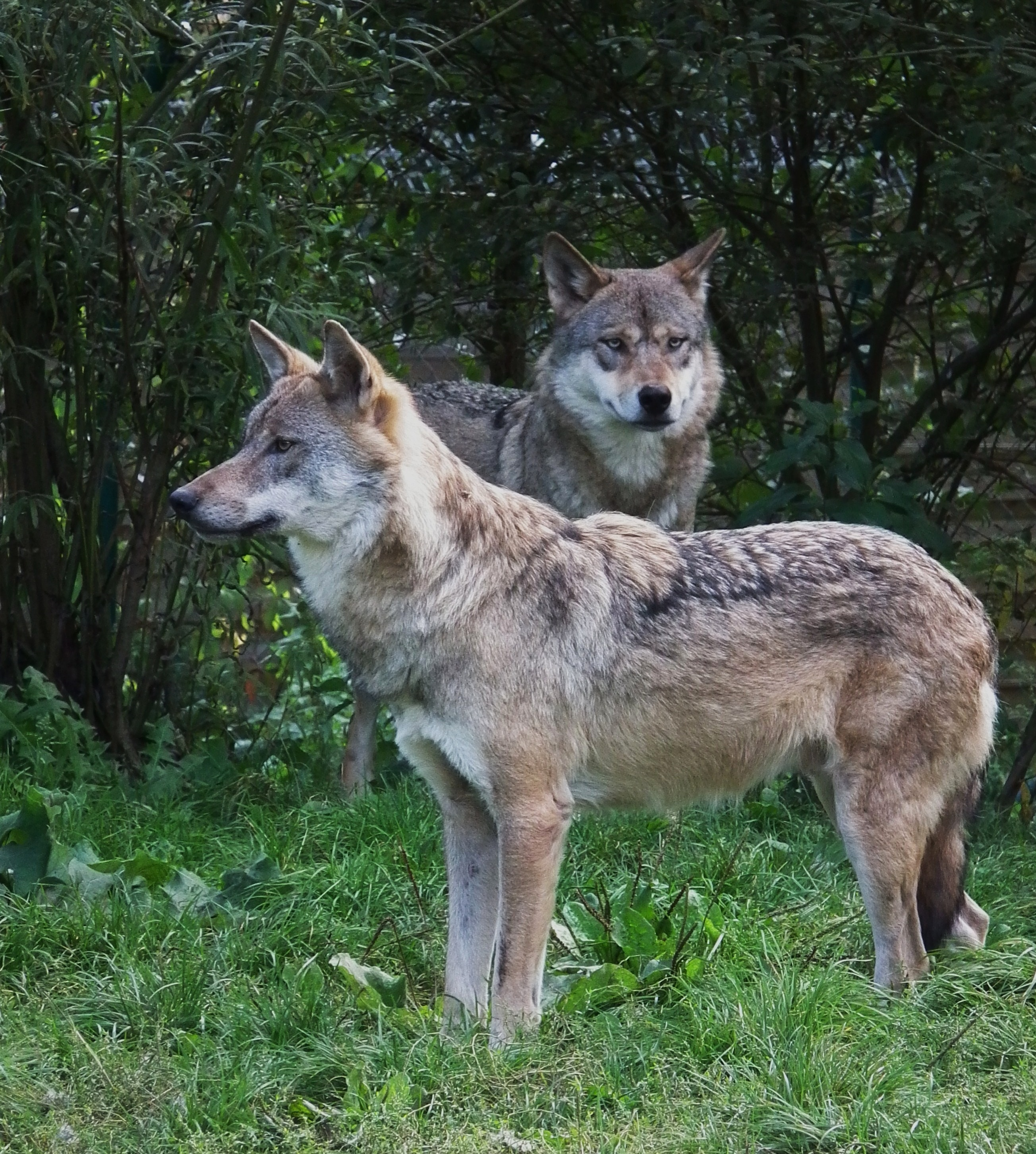
Permanent return of the wolf in the commune in 2003

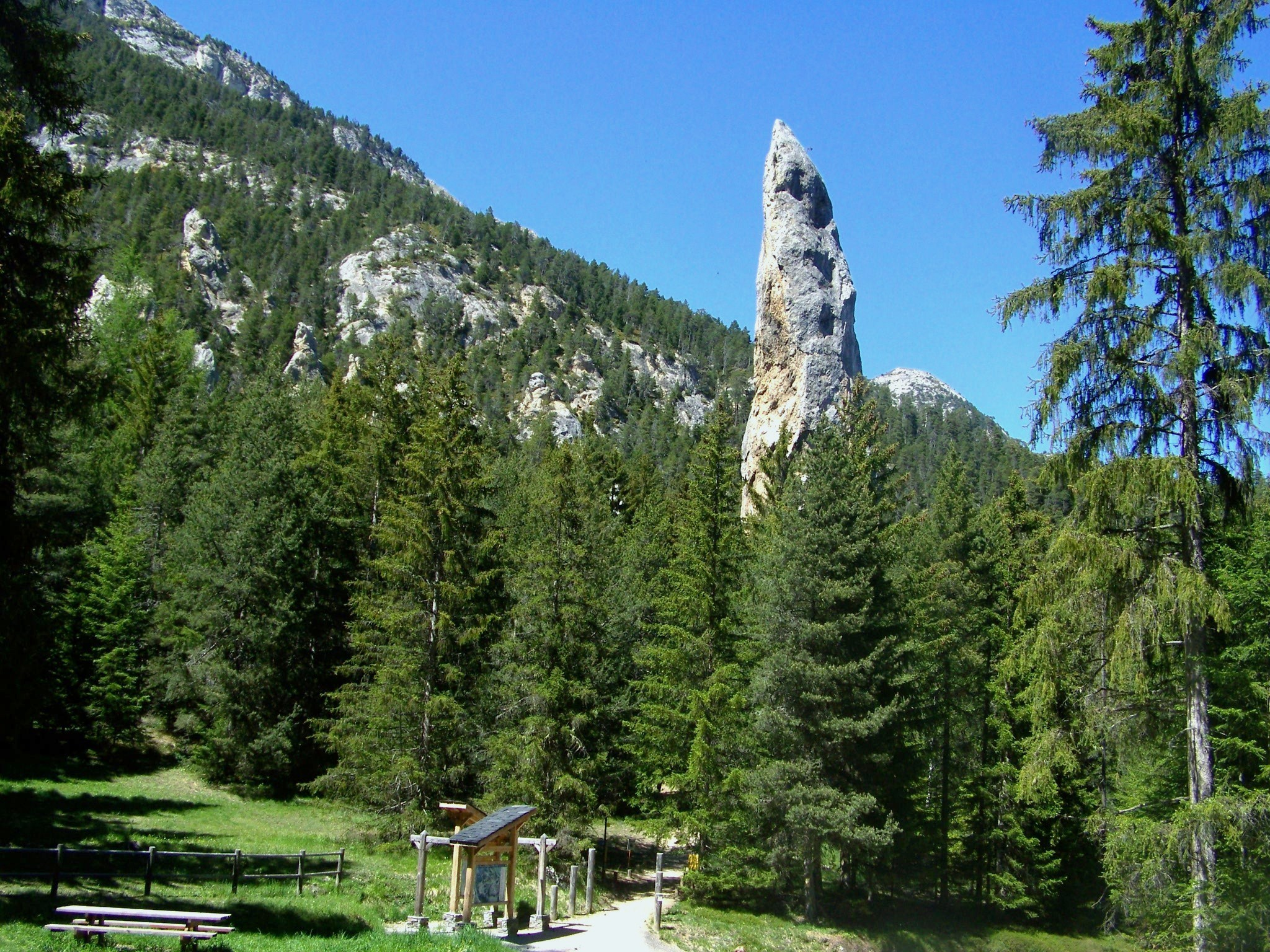
Monolithe of Sardières (93 m)

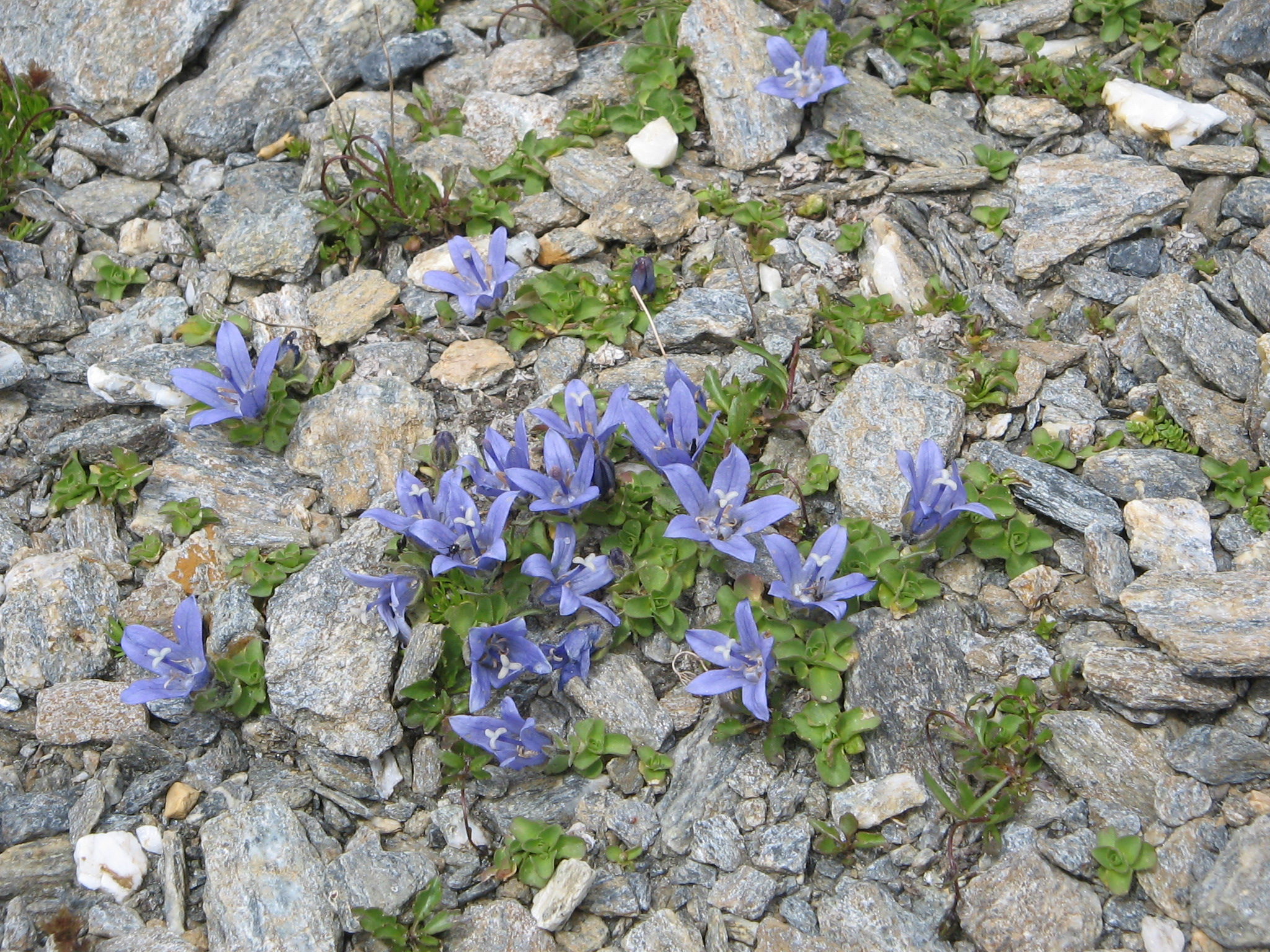
Mont Cenis campanula

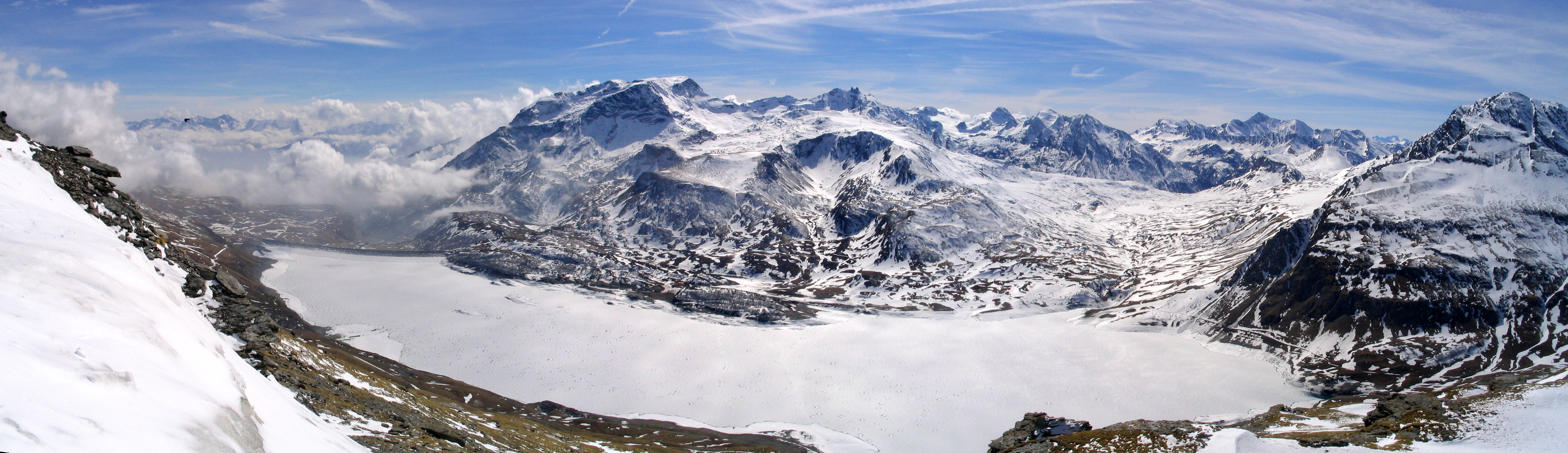
The lake and plateau of Mont Cenis

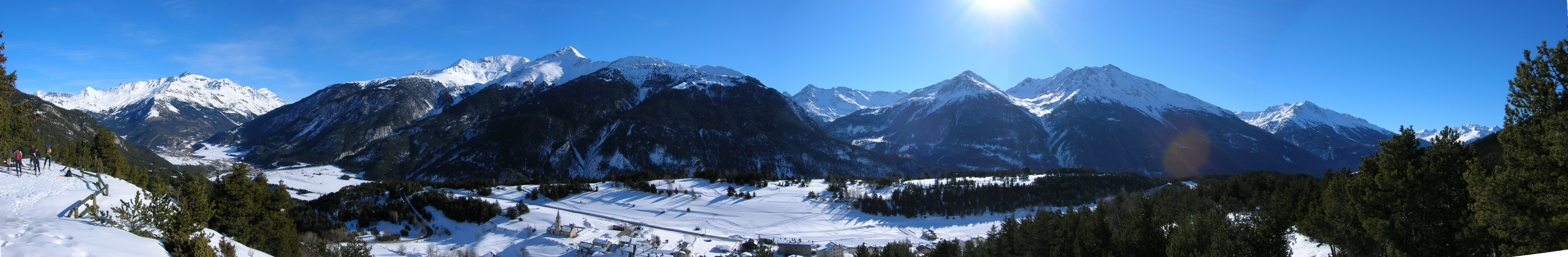
Panoramic view of the massifs of Mont Cenis and Ambin

== See also ==
- Communes of the Savoie department
