= Maurienne =

Former Savoy province

Coordinates: 45°12′N 6°40′E

Maurienne (French pronunciation: [mɔʁjɛn]; Arpitan: Môrièna; Italian: Moriana) is one of the provinces of Savoy, corresponding to the arrondissement of Saint-Jean-de-Maurienne in France. It is also the original name of the capital of the province, now Saint-Jean-de-Maurienne.

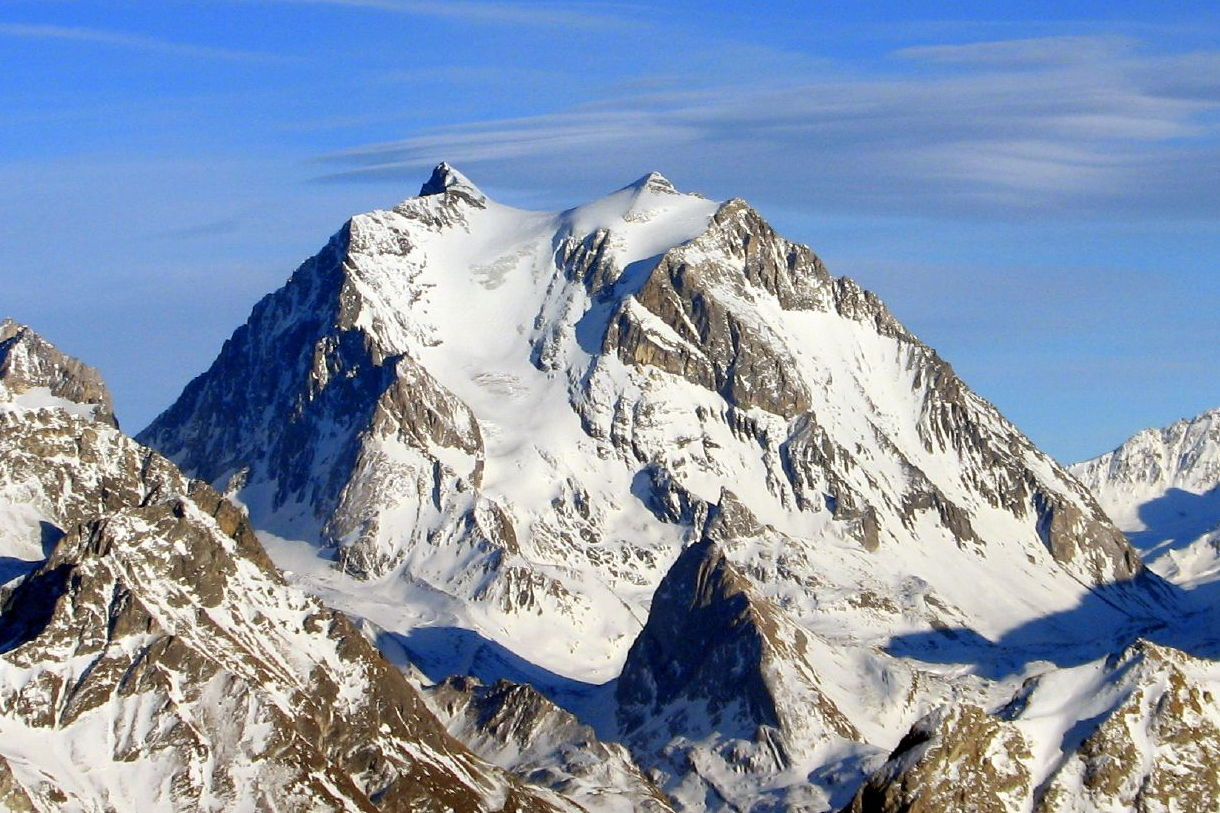
The Grande Casse is the main peak of the valley.

== Location ==
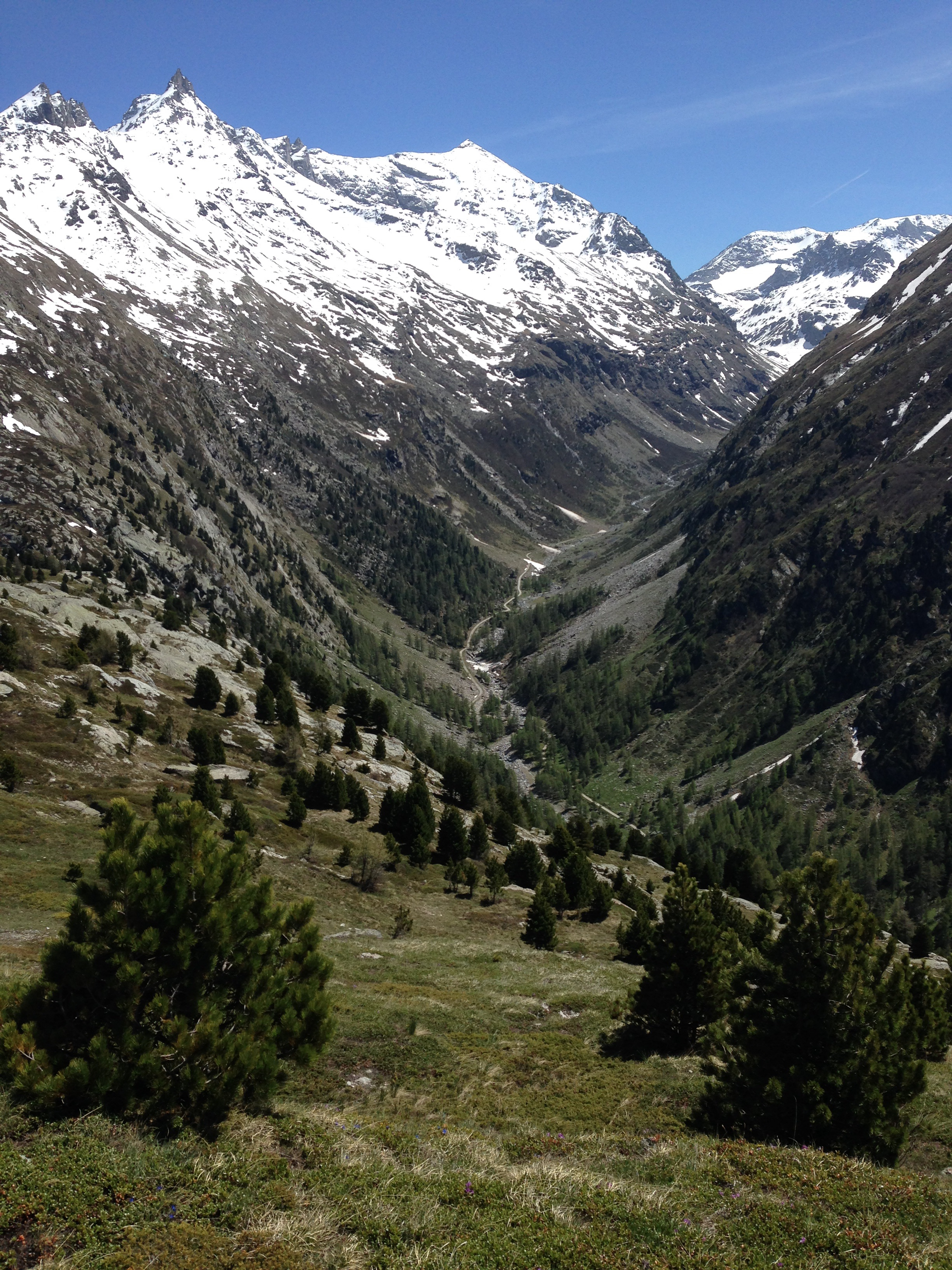
The crystalline range of Ambin and one of its numerous wild valleys in Maurienne

The Maurienne valley is one of the great transverse valleys of the Alps. The river which has shaped the valley since the last glaciation is the Arc. The valley begins at the village of Écot (in the commune of Bonneval-sur-Arc), at the foot of the Col de l'Iseran, and ends at the confluence of the Arc and the Isère in the commune of Aiton. The mountains on the southern side are the Dauphiné Alps and the Cottian Alps. On the northern side are the part of the Graian Alps known as the Vanoise. The capital, Saint-Jean-de-Maurienne, lies at the confluence of the Arc and the Arvan.

== Roads and railways ==
Part of the main road and rail route between Lyon and Turin runs through the valley. The A43 autoroute and a railway line enter at the western end from the Isère valley, and leave at Modane using the Fréjus Road and Rail Tunnels respectively which both emerge at Bardonecchia in Italy. The Turin–Lyon high-speed railway will also be built through the lower valley.

The other roads out of the valley use the following mountain cols:

- The Col de l'Iseran toward the Tarentaise Valley
- The Col du Mont-Cenis toward Italy
- The Col du Télégraphe and the Col du Galibier toward the Col du Lautaret which gives access in turn (in different directions) towards Grenoble or Briançon
- The Col de la Croix-de-Fer and the Col du Glandon toward Grenoble
- The Col de la Madeleine toward the Tarentaise
- The Col du Grand Cucheron towards the Isère valley

Other cols such as the Col d'Etache, Col du Carro and the Col de Vallée Etroite are only passable on foot.

== Districts ==
Geographers traditionally distinguish three areas: the lower, middle and upper Maurienne. The province contains the following cantons, from west to east :

- canton d'Aiguebelle
- canton de La Chambre
- canton de Saint-Jean-de-Maurienne
- canton de Saint-Michel-de-Maurienne
- canton de Modane
- canton de Lanslebourg-Mont-Cenis

== Economy ==
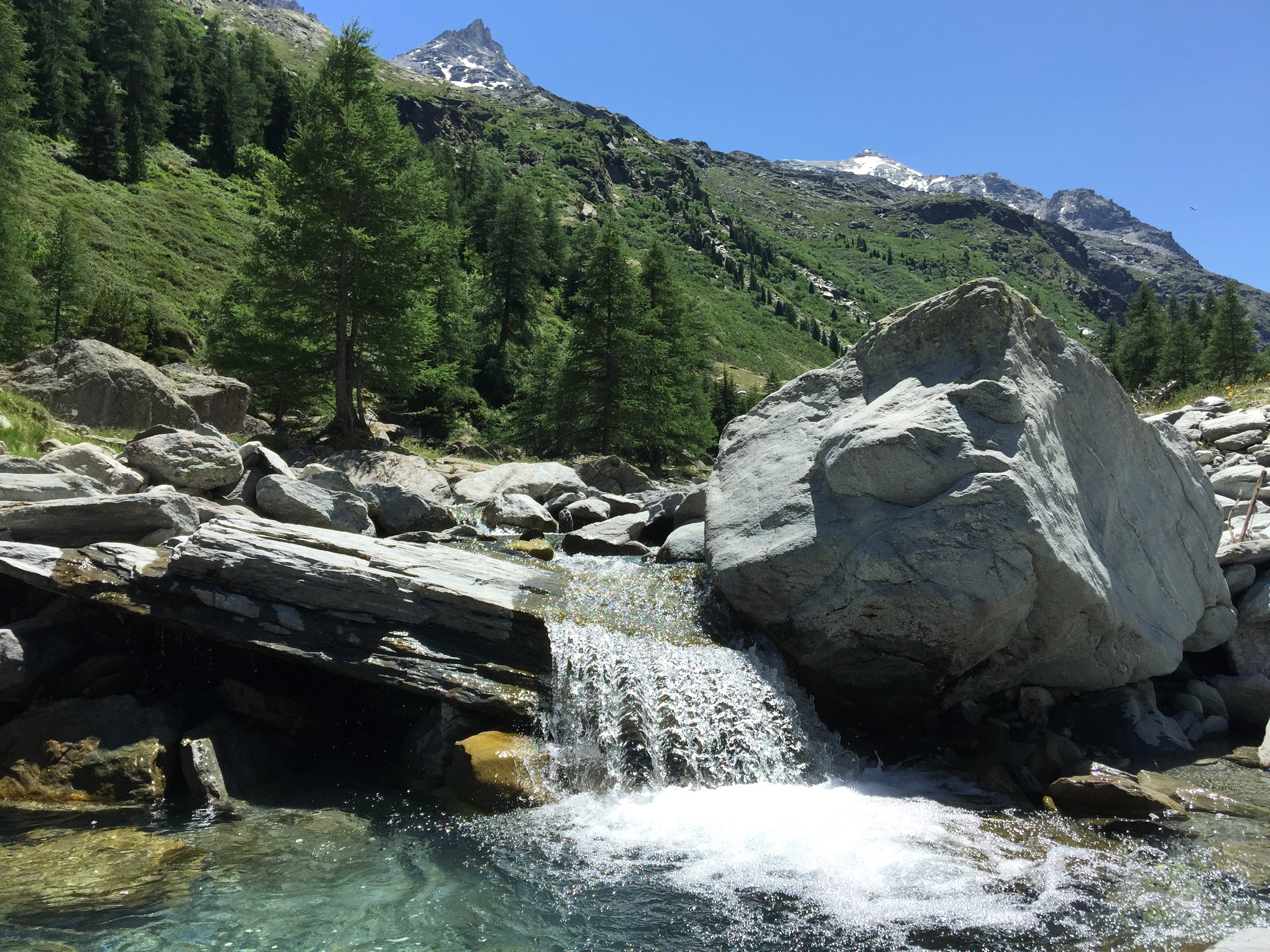
The well preserved nature, thanks to the national park, attracts many tourists looking for real alpine wilderness, and a fauna still preserved.

The abundance of hydro-electric power (there are twenty-four hydroelectric stations in the valley) created heavy industry such as electrochemical plants and aluminum refining, but now the emphasis in the area is on tourism, especially winter sports. Numerous ski resorts line the valley, from the small villages like Albiez-Montrond to the purpose-built resorts, dating from the 1970s like Le Corbier and Les Karellis.

The Vanoise National Park and its protected surroundings are a major tourist attraction. Alpine ibex, grey wolves, lynx, royal eagles or vultures are among the many rare species that live in the numerous valleys of Maurienne.

The famous but rare and expensive Bleu de Termignon cheese is made in the commune of Termignon in the Haute-Maurienne near the Italian border.

== History ==
The region has numerous traces of human habitation since the Paleolithic. In 1032, Humbert the White-Handed received the Maurienne, his native land, from Conrad II the Salian whom he had helped in his Italian campaigns against Aribert, Archbishop of Milan. The House of Savoy maintained their independence as counts and then dukes until Savoy was linked with the Kingdom of Sardinia, which included Piedmont in north-western Italy. In the Maurienne are a series of five forts, La Barrière de l'Esseillon, that were created by the Sardinians in the early 19th century to protect Piedmont from a French invasion. The Maurienne was not incorporated into France until 1860, as part of the political agreement with Napoleon III that brought about the unification of Italy. Despite this, the Maurienne and the Tarentaise valleys are classified as French towns and lands of Art and History.

== The middle Maurienne ==
The middle part of the valley is industrial, and its significant towns are:

- Saint-Jean-de-Maurienne
- Saint-Michel-de-Maurienne

== The upper Maurienne ==
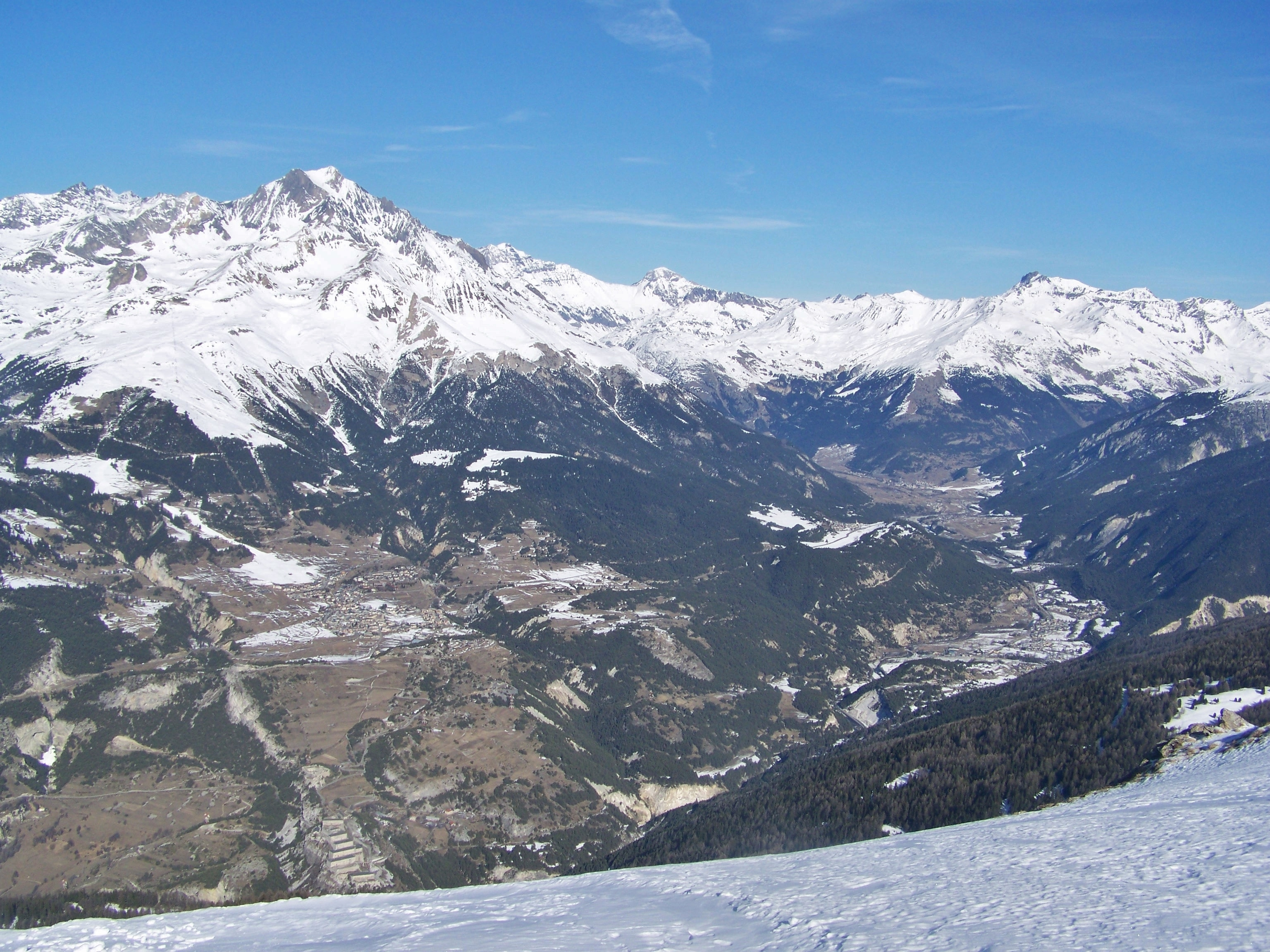
The Maurienne Valley is one of the longest intra-alpine valleys in the Alps.

The upper valley of the Arc is known as haute Maurienne. It lies along the Italian border around 45 km near Mont Cenis. It begins east of Modane, an old frontier town, at the mouth of the Fréjus Road Tunnel, dominated by the resort of Val Fréjus. The villages, rising up from the valley, are:

- le Bourget
- Avrieux
- Villarodin
- Aussois (ski resort)
- Bramans (authentic town)
- Sollières-Sardières (has a useful small airstrip)
- Termignon
- Lanslebourg-Mont-Cenis, Lanslevillard (the two villages form the resort Val Cenis)
- Bessans (popular area for cross-country skiing and international biathlon stadium, unique in France)
- Bonneval-sur-Arc (area for Alpine skiing)
- L'Ecot

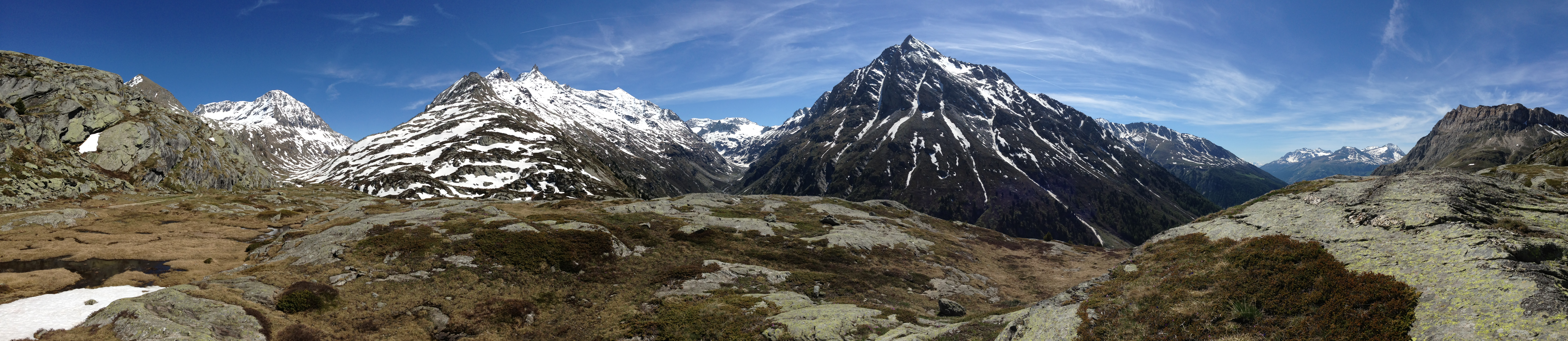
Haute Maurienne entirely covered by Vanoise National Park and its protected periphery.

About 5,000 inhabitants live there permanently, but the population reaches about 15,000 in the winter.

Much of the upper Maurienne is included in Vanoise National Park, which became the first national park in France in 1963. This borders Gran Paradiso National Park of Italy. The two parks are important areas for ibexes, chamois, and golden eagles; the lammergeier was recently reintroduced into the area. It appears that wolves have reached the region within the past five years.

== Skiing and snowboarding ==
The Maurienne valley is home to around 20 ski resorts. There is also access to The Three Valleys via the Orelle gondola.

=== Alpine/downhill ===
In rough order heading up the valley:

- Saint-François-Longchamp (linked to Valmorel)
- Les Sybelles comprising Le Corbier, La Toussuire, Saint-Jean-d'Arves, Saint-Sorlin-d'Arves, Les Bottières, Saint-Colomban-des-Villards
- Albiez-Montrond
- Les Karellis
- Valloire and Valmeinier
- Orelle, where the gondola gives access to the Plan Bouchet skiing area, and hence Val Thorens and the "Three Valleys"
- Valfréjus
- La Norma
- Aussois
- Bramans
- Termignon
- Val Cenis
- Bonneval-sur-Arc

=== Cross country ===
- Bessans
- Sollières-Sardières

== See also ==
- Roman Catholic Diocese of Saint-Jean-de-Maurienne
- Roman Catholic Archdiocese of Chambéry–Saint-Jean-de-Maurienne–Tarentaise
