= Aussois =

Aussois Oé (Savoyard)
- Commune
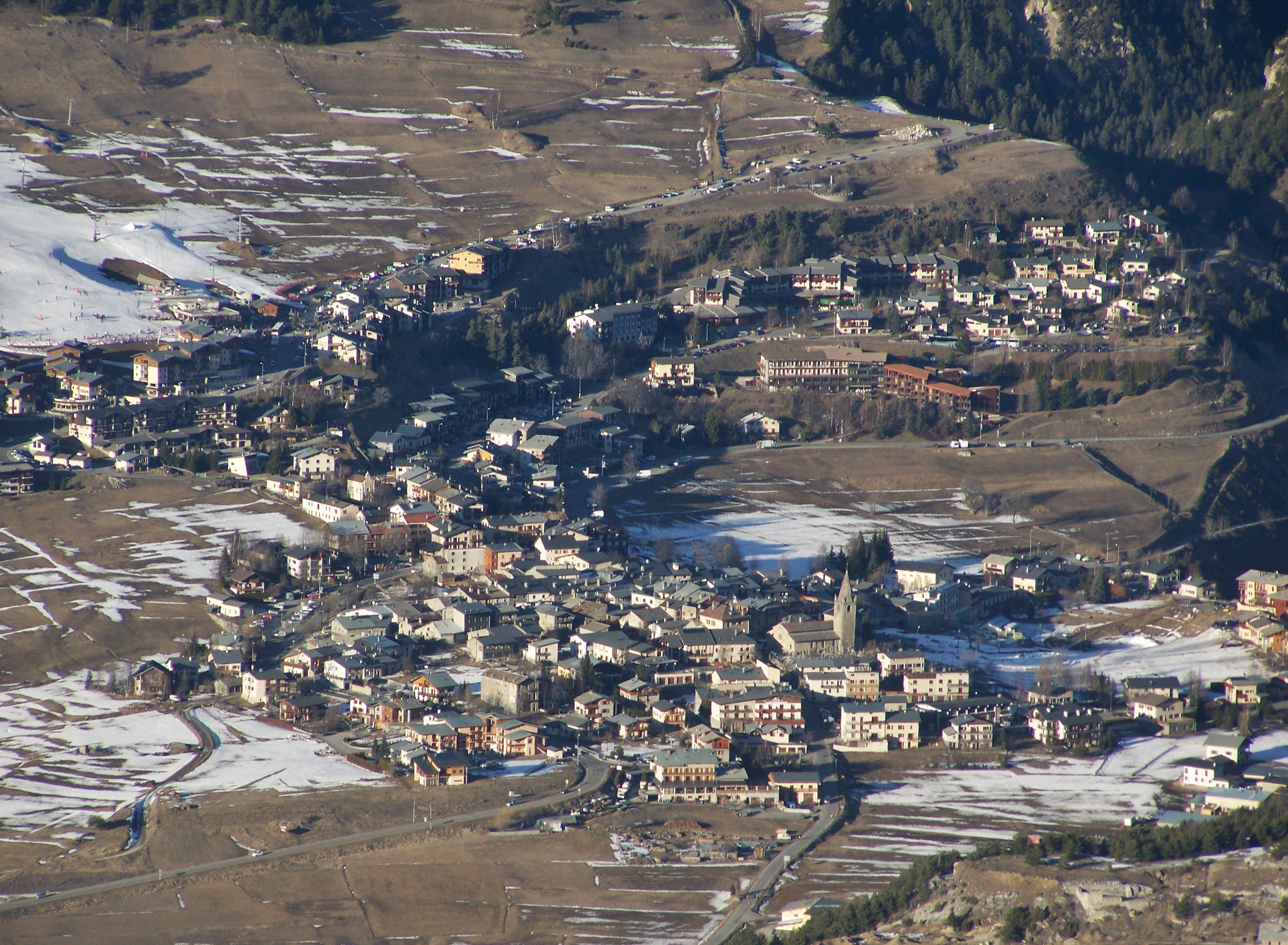
- Aussois seen from La Norma ski resort in February 2011.
- Location of Aussois
- Location within France Location within Auvergne-Rhône-Alpes
- Coordinates: 45°13′38″N 6°44′32″E
- Country: France
- Region: Auvergne-Rhône-Alpes
- Department: Savoie
- Arrondissement: Saint-Jean-de-Maurienne
- Canton: Modane
- Intercommunality: CC Haute Maurienne Vanoise

Government
  - Mayor (2020–2026): Stéphane Boyer
- Area^{1}: 41.94 km^{2} (16.19 sq mi)
- Highest elevation: 3,600 m (11,800 ft)
- Lowest elevation: 1,120 m (3,670 ft)
- Population (2023): 676
  - Density: 16.1/km^{2} (41.7/sq mi)
- Demonym: Aussoyens / Aussoyennes
- Time zone: UTC+01:00 (CET)
  - Summer (DST): UTC+02:00 (CEST)
- INSEE/Postal code: 73023 /73500
- Website: www.aussois.com
- ^{1} French Land Register data, which excludes lakes, ponds, glaciers > 1 km^{2} (0.386 sq mi or 247 acres) and river estuaries.

Aussois (French pronunciation: [oswa], Savoyard: Oé) is a commune in the Vanoise Massif, in the Savoie department in the Auvergne-Rhône-Alpes region in south-eastern France. The village is on the border of France's first National Park, the Vanoise National Park.
Although not as well known as other resorts right on the other side of the mountain like Val Thorens, it is popular with the French as ski resort in winter and as mountain destination in summer.
At 8 km (5.0 mi) from Modane, it is ideally located in the Maurienne region with good transport links in and out of Lyon, Geneva, Grenoble and Chambéry. Aussois can also be reached from Turin via the Fréjus Road Tunnel, linking Bardonecchia in Italy and Modane.
Nearby Gare de Modane is a large railway station with a high-speed service (TGV) Paris - Chambéry - Turin - Milan.
The resort offers 55 km (34 mi) of slopes, 21 slopes (6 Green, 5 Blue, 8 Red, 2 Black).

== Geography ==
=== Climate ===
Aussois has a humid continental climate (Köppen climate classification Dfb) closely bordering on an oceanic climate (Cfb). The average annual temperature in Aussois is 7.3 °C (45.1 °F). The average annual rainfall is 771.0 mm (30.35 in) with November as the wettest month. The temperatures are highest on average in July, at around 16.1 °C (61.0 °F), and lowest in January, at around −0.5 °C (31.1 °F). The highest temperature ever recorded in Aussois was 32.8 °C (91.0 °F) on 5 July 2015; the coldest temperature ever recorded was −22.5 °C (−8.5 °F) on 12 January 1987.

Climate data for Aussois (1991−2020 normals, extremes 1986−present)
Month	Jan	Feb	Mar	Apr	May	Jun	Jul	Aug	Sep	Oct	Nov	Dec	Year
Record high °C (°F)	16.2 (61.2)	18.1 (64.6)	20.0 (68.0)	23.5 (74.3)	28.4 (83.1)	32.6 (90.7)	32.8 (91.0)	30.9 (87.6)	27.4 (81.3)	25.0 (77.0)	21.9 (71.4)	15.5 (59.9)	32.8 (91.0)
Mean daily maximum °C (°F)	3.6 (38.5)	4.2 (39.6)	7.6 (45.7)	10.9 (51.6)	15.3 (59.5)	19.4 (66.9)	21.7 (71.1)	21.4 (70.5)	17.2 (63.0)	13.0 (55.4)	7.2 (45.0)	4.0 (39.2)	12.1 (53.8)
Daily mean °C (°F)	−0.5 (31.1)	−0.4 (31.3)	2.8 (37.0)	5.9 (42.6)	10.1 (50.2)	13.9 (57.0)	16.1 (61.0)	16.0 (60.8)	12.1 (53.8)	8.4 (47.1)	3.2 (37.8)	0.0 (32.0)	7.3 (45.1)
Mean daily minimum °C (°F)	−4.7 (23.5)	−4.9 (23.2)	−2.0 (28.4)	0.9 (33.6)	4.9 (40.8)	8.4 (47.1)	10.4 (50.7)	10.5 (50.9)	7.1 (44.8)	3.7 (38.7)	−0.9 (30.4)	−4.0 (24.8)	2.4 (36.3)
Record low °C (°F)	−22.5 (−8.5)	−20.7 (−5.3)	−16.3 (2.7)	−9.4 (15.1)	−5.6 (21.9)	−2.3 (27.9)	2.4 (36.3)	1.6 (34.9)	−3.6 (25.5)	−7.1 (19.2)	−14.8 (5.4)	−17.4 (0.7)	−22.5 (−8.5)
Average precipitation mm (inches)	74.0 (2.91)	55.0 (2.17)	55.5 (2.19)	52.7 (2.07)	71.7 (2.82)	62.8 (2.47)	50.8 (2.00)	58.1 (2.29)	56.0 (2.20)	70.9 (2.79)	83.0 (3.27)	80.5 (3.17)	771.0 (30.35)
Average precipitation days (≥ 1.0 mm)	8.8	8.0	7.4	8.1	9.4	9.4	8.1	8.6	7.5	7.9	9.2	9.3	101.6
Source: Météo-France

== Image gallery ==
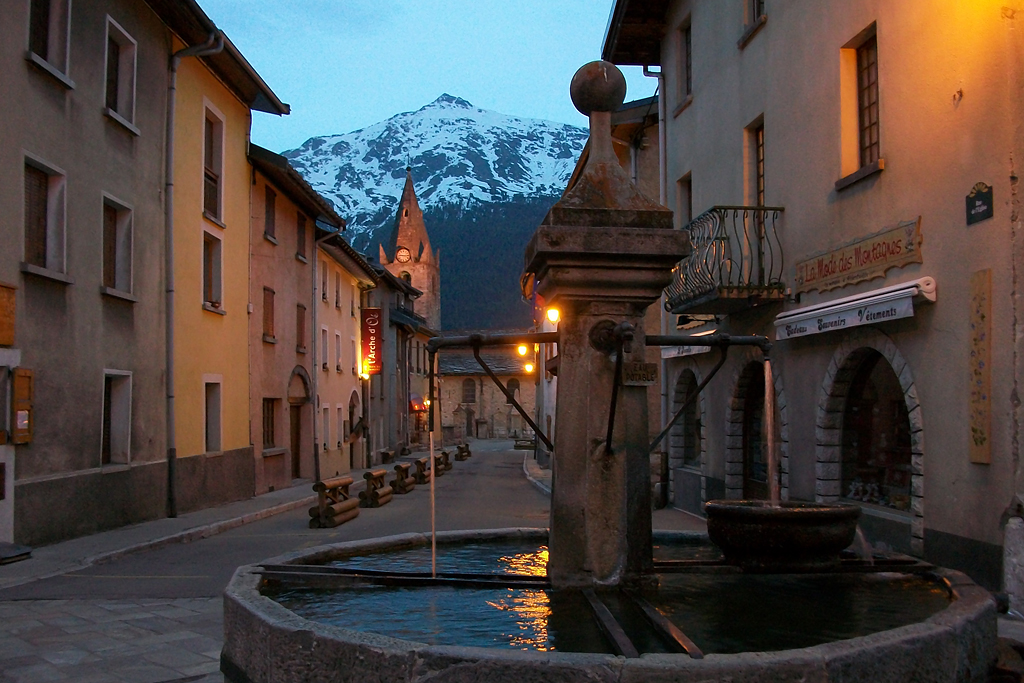
Downtown of Aussois in May 2009

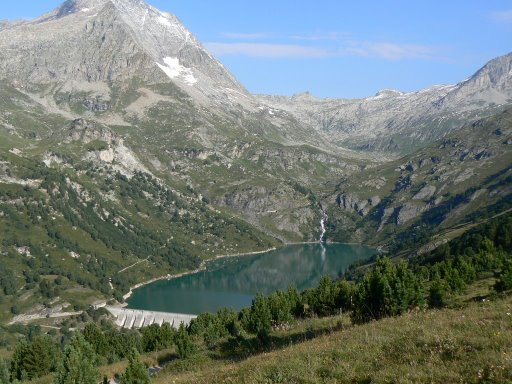
Plan d'Amont' lake and dam, Aussois in August 2007

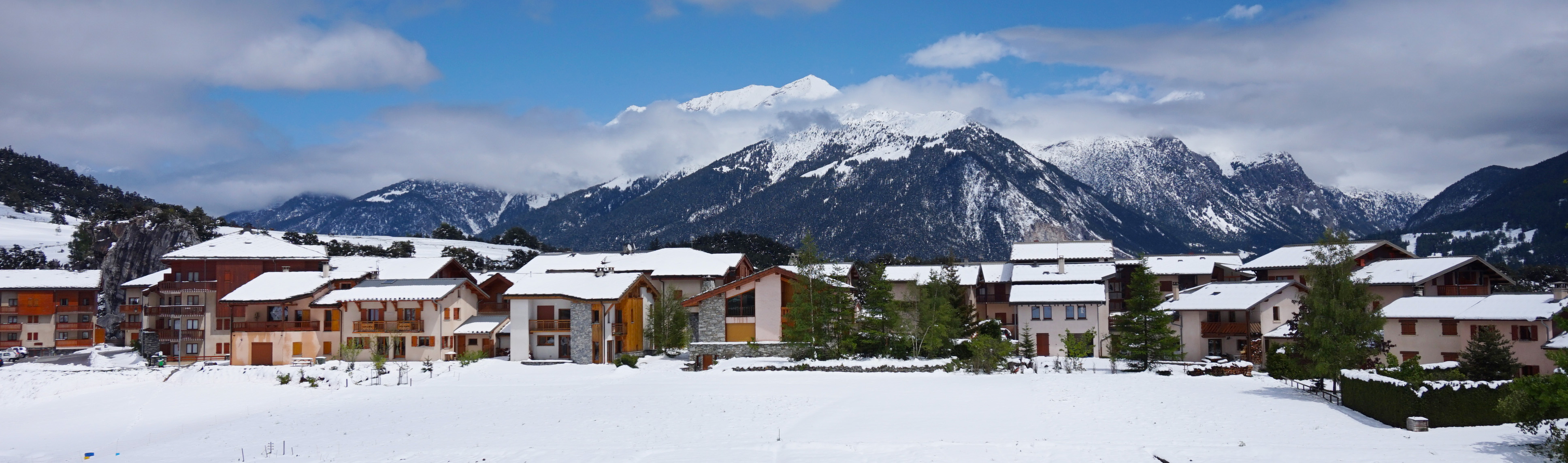
Uptown, at the foot of the slopes

== See also ==
- Communes of the Savoie department
