= Jardin botanique de Mont Cenis =

Botanical garden in Savoie, Rhône-Alpes, France

Coordinates: 45°15′37″N 6°54′03″E

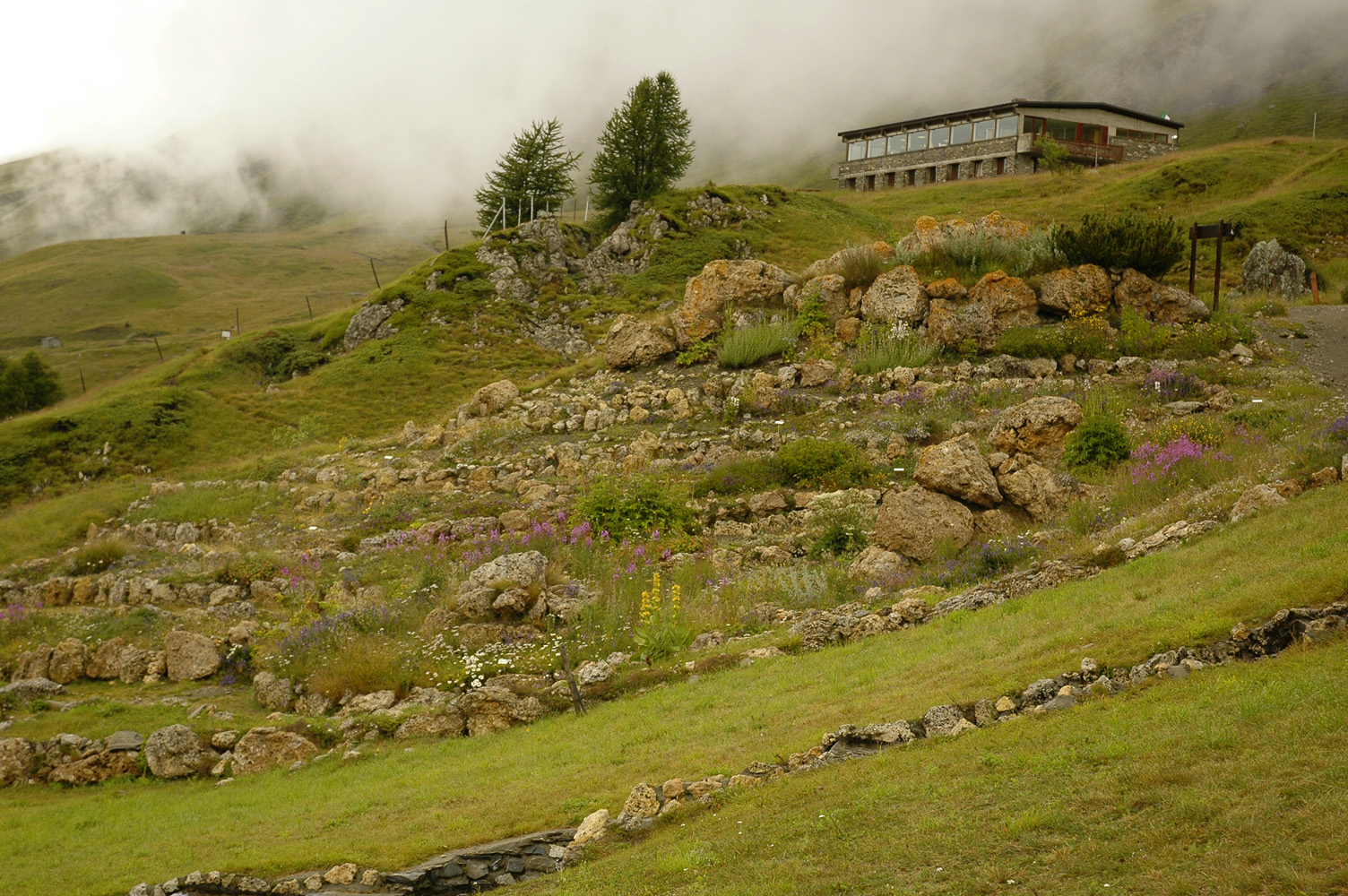
Jardin botanique de Mont Cenis

The Jardin botanique de Mont Cenis is an alpine botanical garden located on Mont Cenis above the town of Lanslebourg-Mont-Cenis, Savoie, Rhône-Alpes, France. The garden was created in 1976 at an altitude of about 2000 meters above sea level, and now contains about 800 plants.

== See also ==
- List of botanical gardens in France
