= Les Karellis =

Ski resort in the Maurienne Valley, France

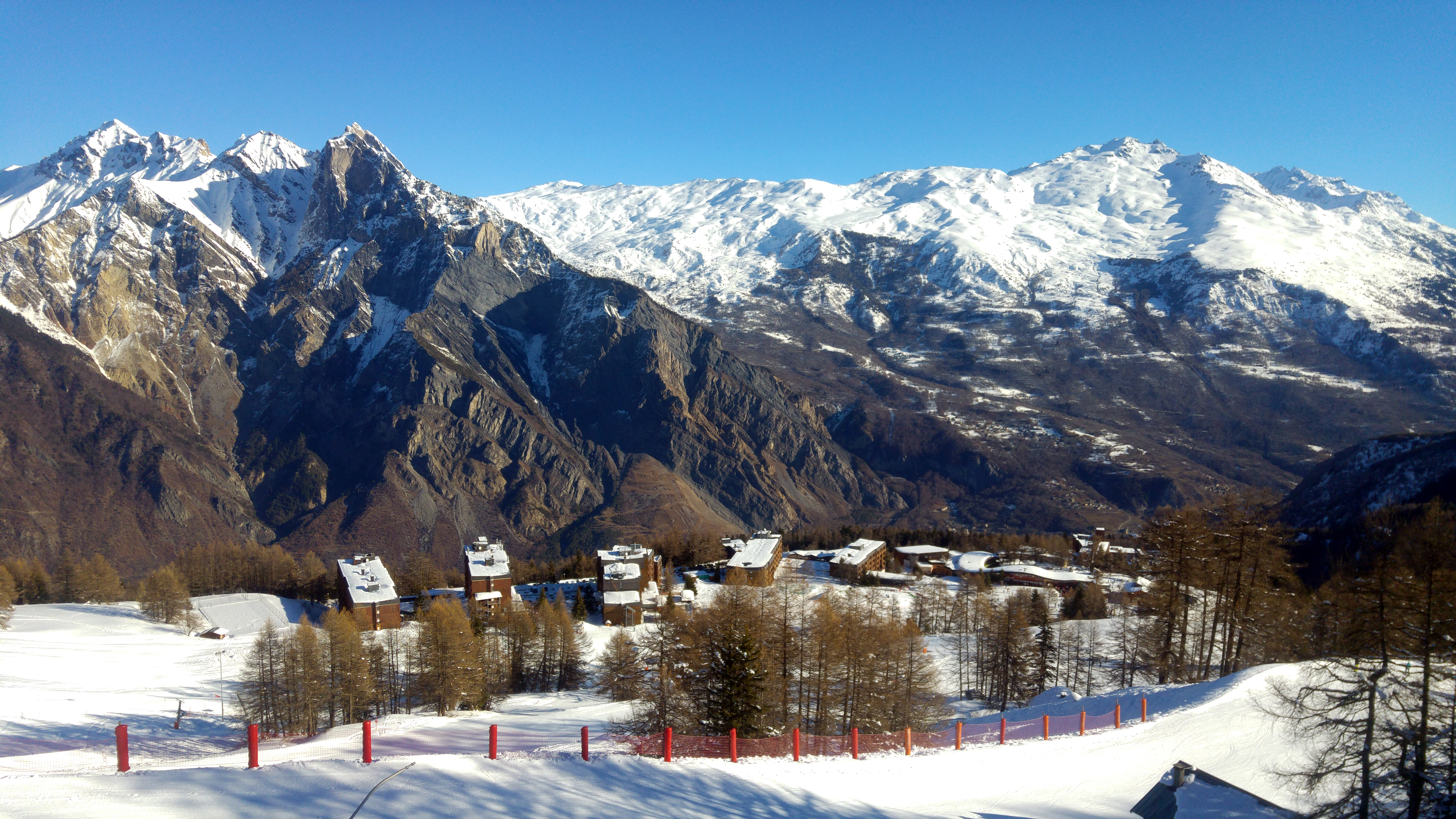

- Location within Alps
- Nearest city: Chambéry
- Coordinates: 45°13′44″N 6°24′12″E
- Top elevation: 2,495 m (8,186 ft)
- Base elevation: 1,550 m (5,090 ft)
- Skiable area: 60 km of runs
- Trails: 28; 7 beginner 6 easy 11 intermediate 4 difficult
- Website: Website

Les Karellis is a ski resort in the Maurienne Valley, located in the commune of Montricher-Albanne, in the Savoie department in the Auvergne-Rhône-Alpes region.

The station was opened in 1975.
