= Vanoise National Park =

Alpine national park in Savoie

- Parc national de la Vanoise
- IUCN category II (national park)
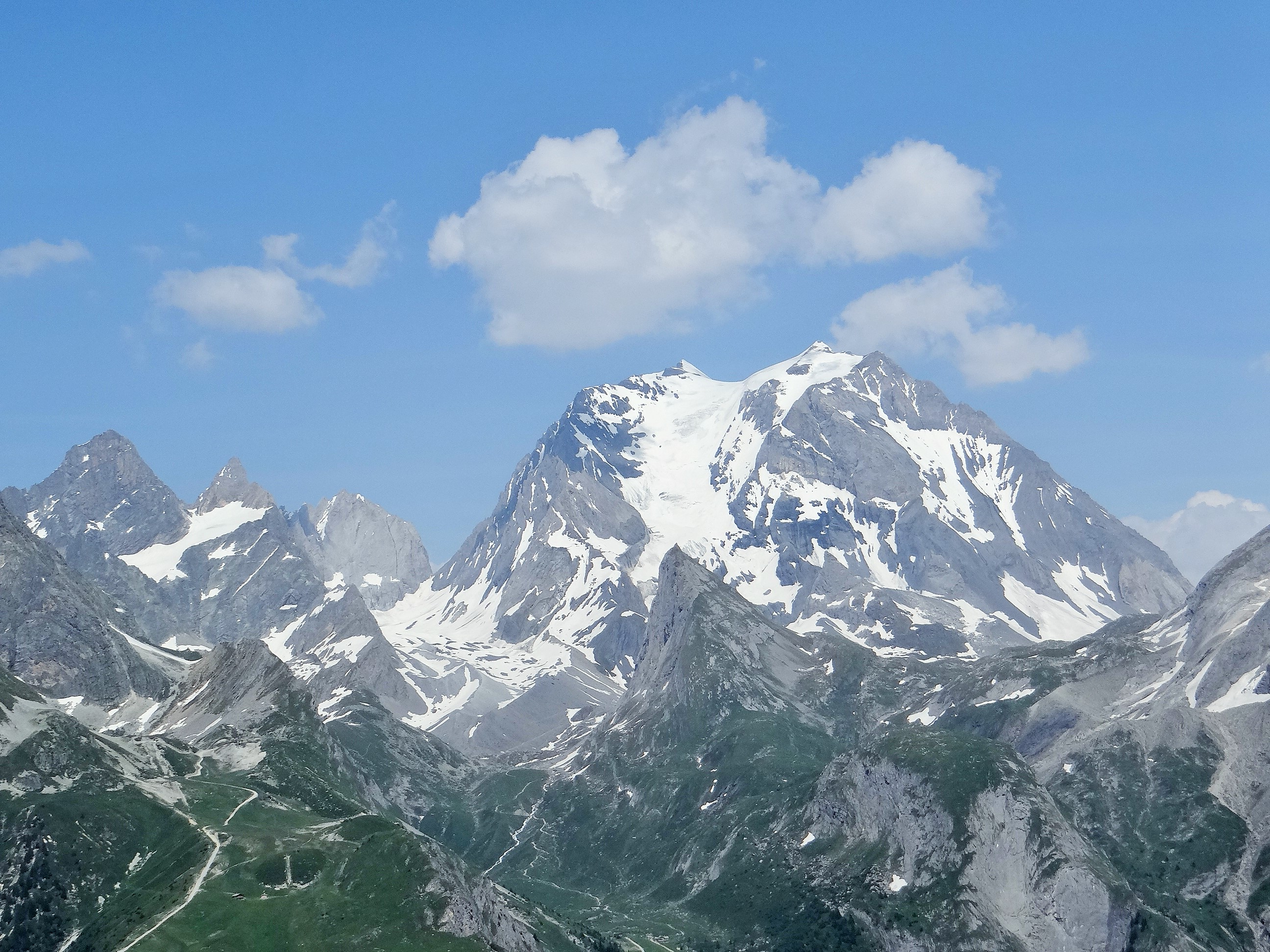
- Grande Casse (3855 m), highest summit of Vanoise

- Location within France Location within Savoie
- Location: Savoie, France
- Nearest city: Modane; Bourg-Saint-Maurice
- Coordinates: 45°20′N 6°50′E
- Area: 534 km^{2} (206 sq mi)
- Established: 6 July 1963
- Governing body: Parcs nationaux de France

Vanoise National Park (French: Parc national de la Vanoise) is a French national park between the Tarentaise and Maurienne valleys in the French Alps, containing the Vanoise Massif. It was created in 1963 as the first national park in France.

Vanoise National Park is in the département of Savoie. Small villages like Champagny-le-Haut, Termignon, La Chiserette, Bramans, Sollières-Sardières, Friburge, Pralognan-la-Vanoise and Séez, lie near the park. The park is bordered by several large French ski resorts (Les Trois Vallées, Tignes, Val-d'Isère, Les Arcs, La Plagne). L'Ecot, a traditional hamlet of Bonneval-sur-Arc located inside the protected area, is also part of the park.

On the Italian side of the border, the park is continued by Gran Paradiso National Park. Together, these two parks cover over 1250 km^{2}, making the area the largest alpine national park.

== Wildlife ==
The park is well known for its population of Alpine ibex (Capra ibex), bouquetin in French, which is its emblem. The alpine chamois, like the ibex, spends most of the year above the tree line. It descends below the snow line from late fall to early spring to graze on grass not covered by ice and snow. Alpine marmot, wolf, Eurasian lynx, mountain hare, Eurasian badger, ermine, and weasel are other mammals commonly present in Vanoise.

There are more than 100 bird species in the protected area. Birds of prey include the bearded vulture, golden eagle, and Eurasian eagle-owl. Other birds found in the park are black woodpeckers, rock ptarmigans, Alpine accentors, nutcrackers, choughs, and black grouse. The wallcreeper is found on steep cliffs, especially for nesting.

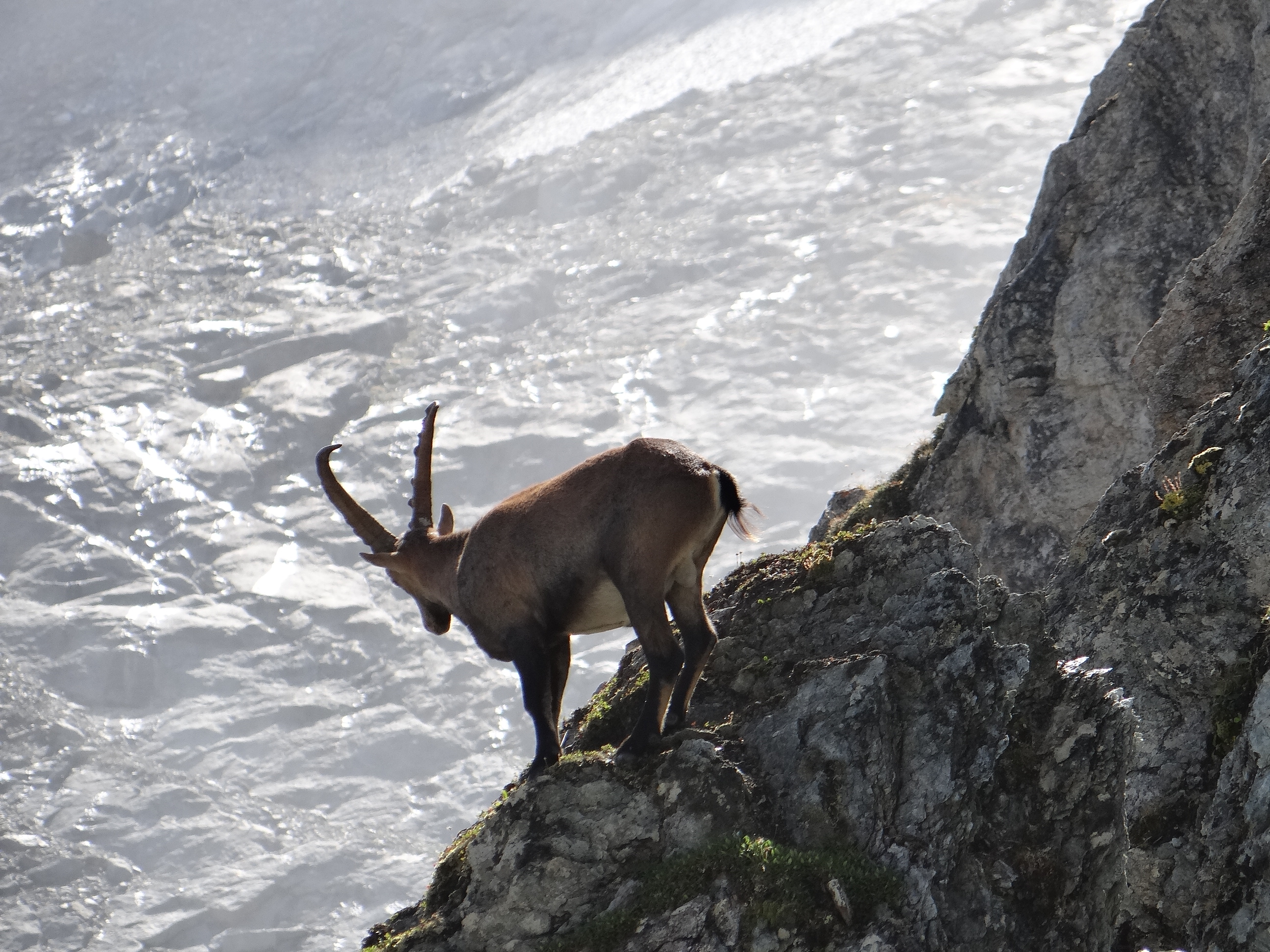
Ibex on rocky ridgeline

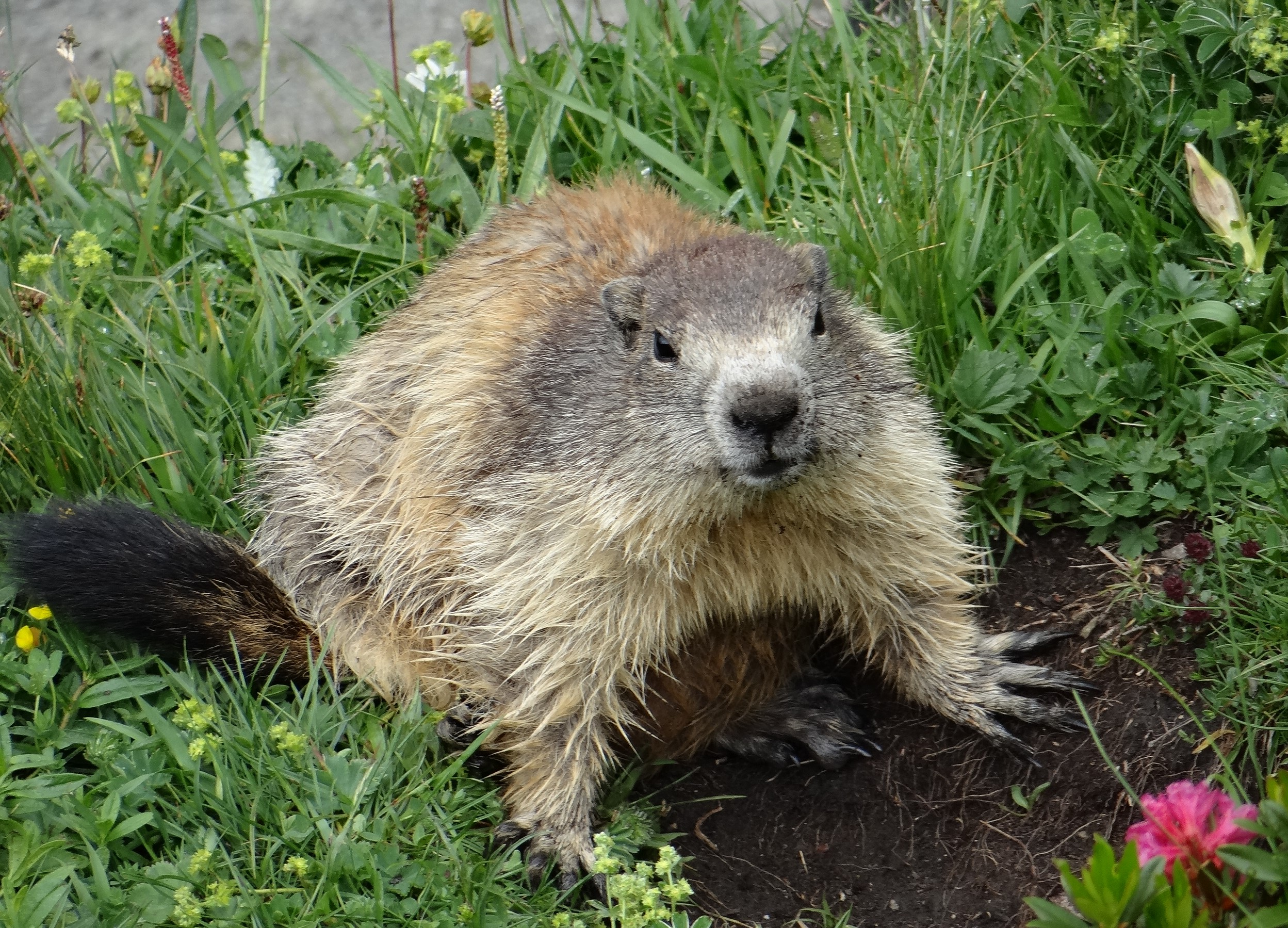
Marmot

== See also ==
- Vanoise Massif
