= Sollières-Sardières =

Sollières-Sardières Sôlère Sardére (Savoyard)
- Part of Val-Cenis
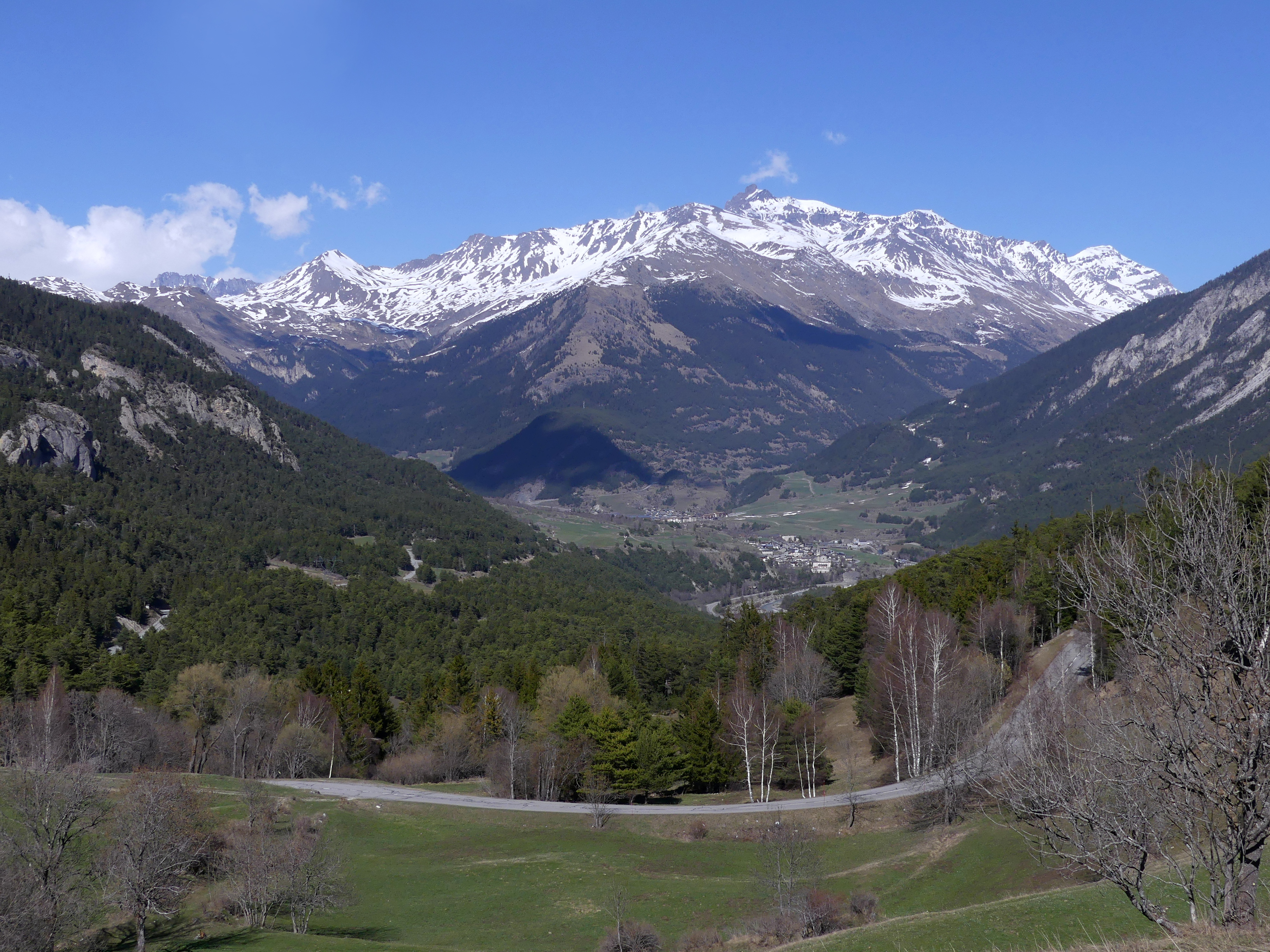
- View from Sardières towards Sollières
- Location of Sollières-Sardières
- Location within France Location within Auvergne-Rhône-Alpes
- Coordinates: 45°15′54″N 6°48′33″E
- Country: France
- Region: Auvergne-Rhône-Alpes
- Department: Savoie
- Arrondissement: Saint-Jean-de-Maurienne
- Canton: Modane
- Commune: Val-Cenis
- Area^{1}: 33.31 km^{2} (12.86 sq mi)
- Elevation: 1,270 m (4,170 ft)
- Highest elevation: 3,241 m (10,633 ft)
- Lowest elevation: 1,232 m (4,042 ft)
- Population (2022): 192
  - Density: 5.76/km^{2} (14.9/sq mi)
- Time zone: UTC+01:00 (CET)
  - Summer (DST): UTC+02:00 (CEST)
- Postal code: 73500
- ^{1} French Land Register data, which excludes lakes, ponds, glaciers > 1 km^{2} (0.386 sq mi or 247 acres) and river estuaries.

Sollières-Sardières (Savoyard: Sôlère Sardére) is a former commune in the Savoie department in the Auvergne-Rhône-Alpes region in south-eastern France. On 1 January 2017, it was merged into the new commune Val-Cenis. It is located the heart of the Alps in the upper Maurienne valley 120 km long. Part of the region is within the Vanoise National Park. The remaining land is not included in the protected area called "zone peripherique" which has lesser environmental protection enforcement rules. Some flowers can only be found in the heights of the commune and in boreal regions. It has a small airstrip ICAO code: LFKD

Villages and landscapes

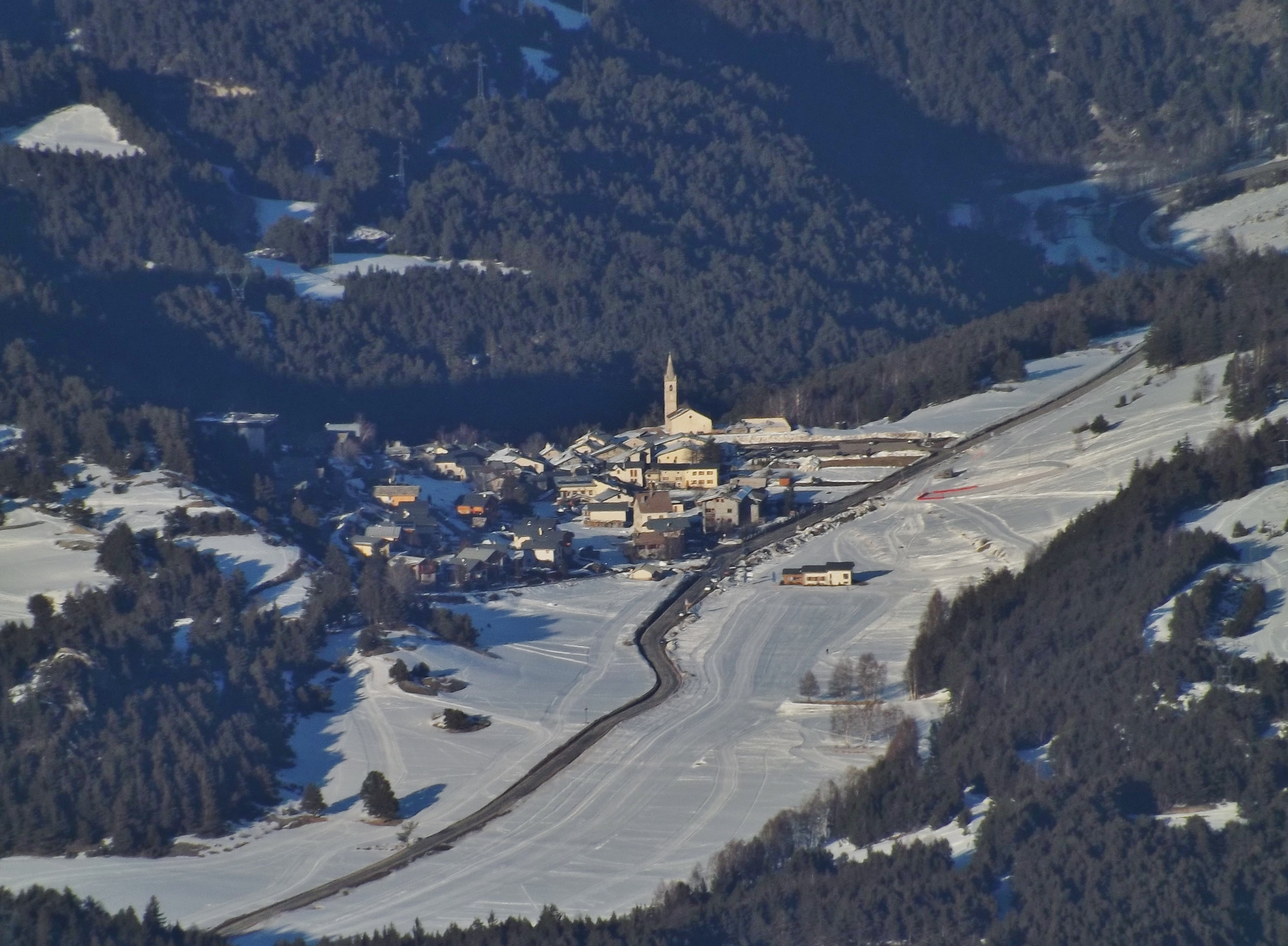
The village of Sardières in winter

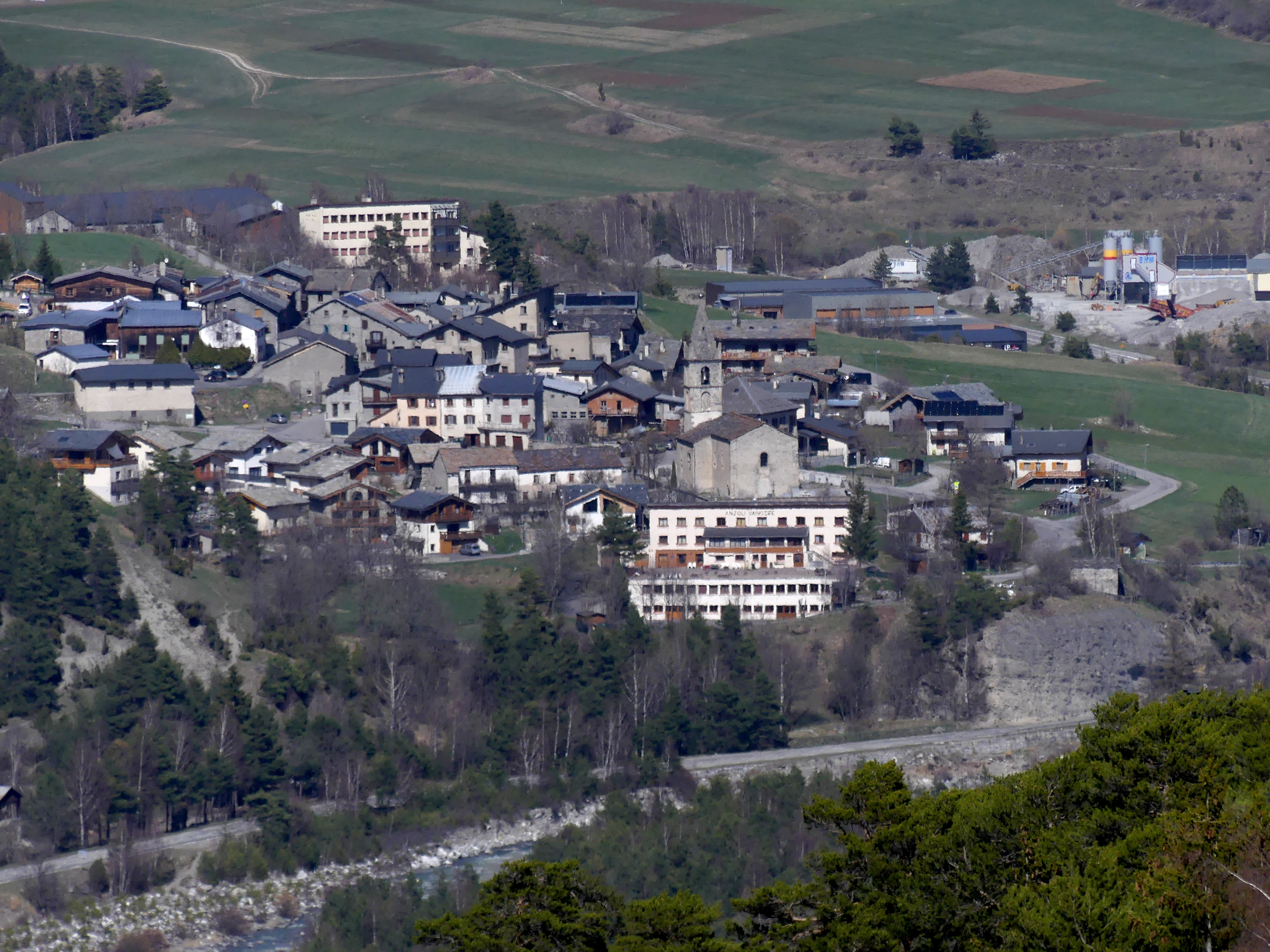
The village of Sollières

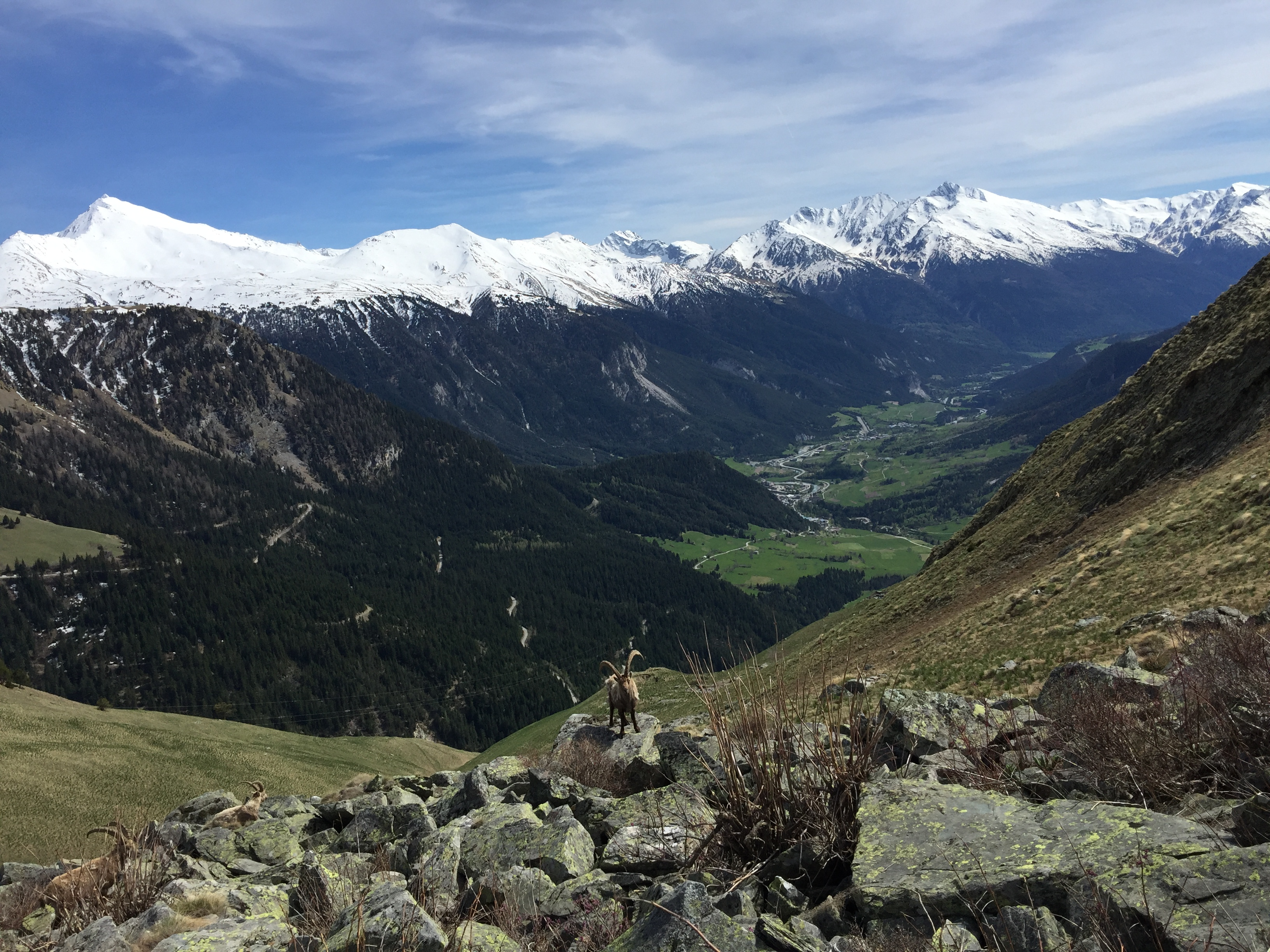
The commune lies at the limit of the Vanoise National Park

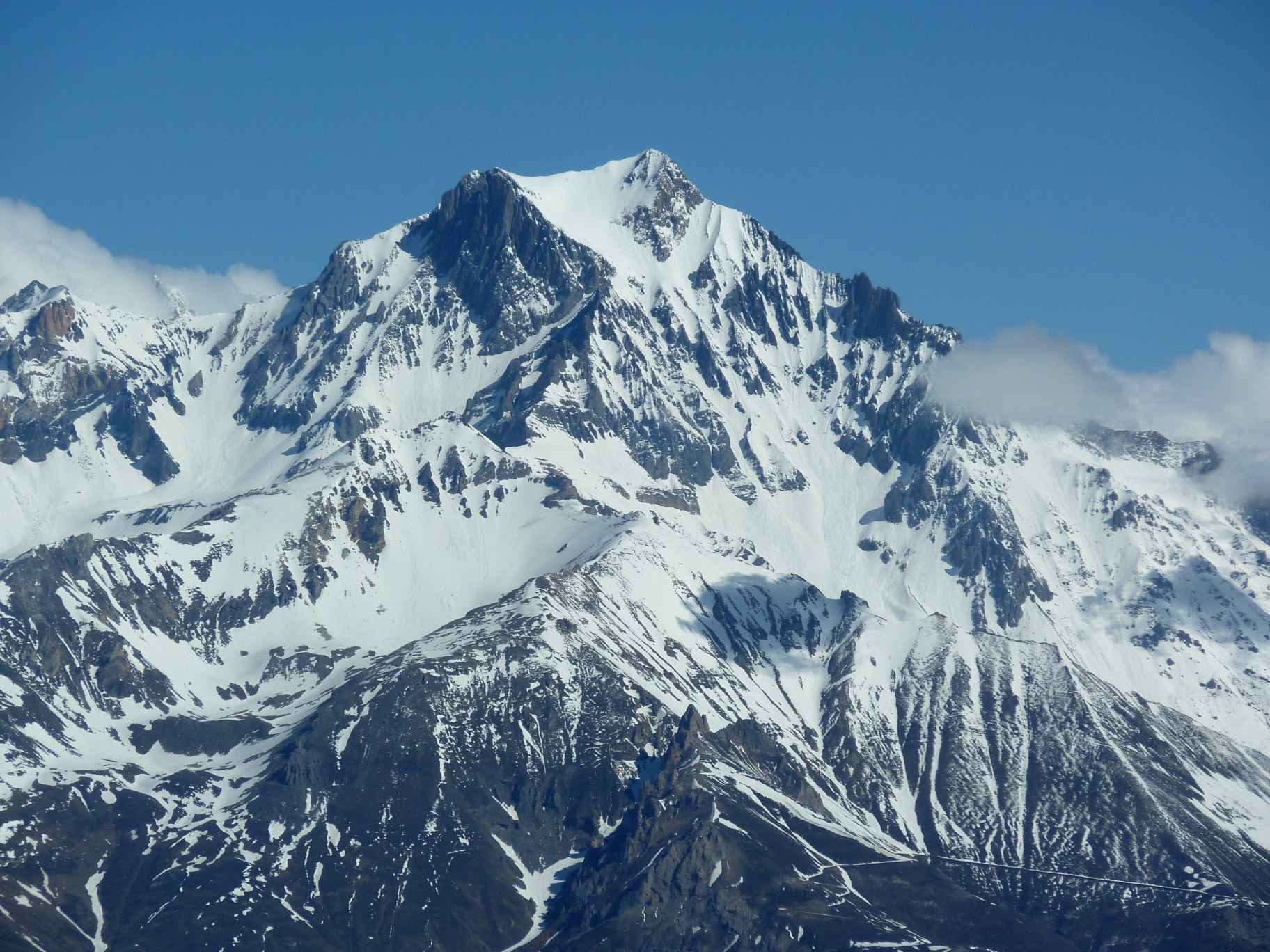
The Dent Parrachée

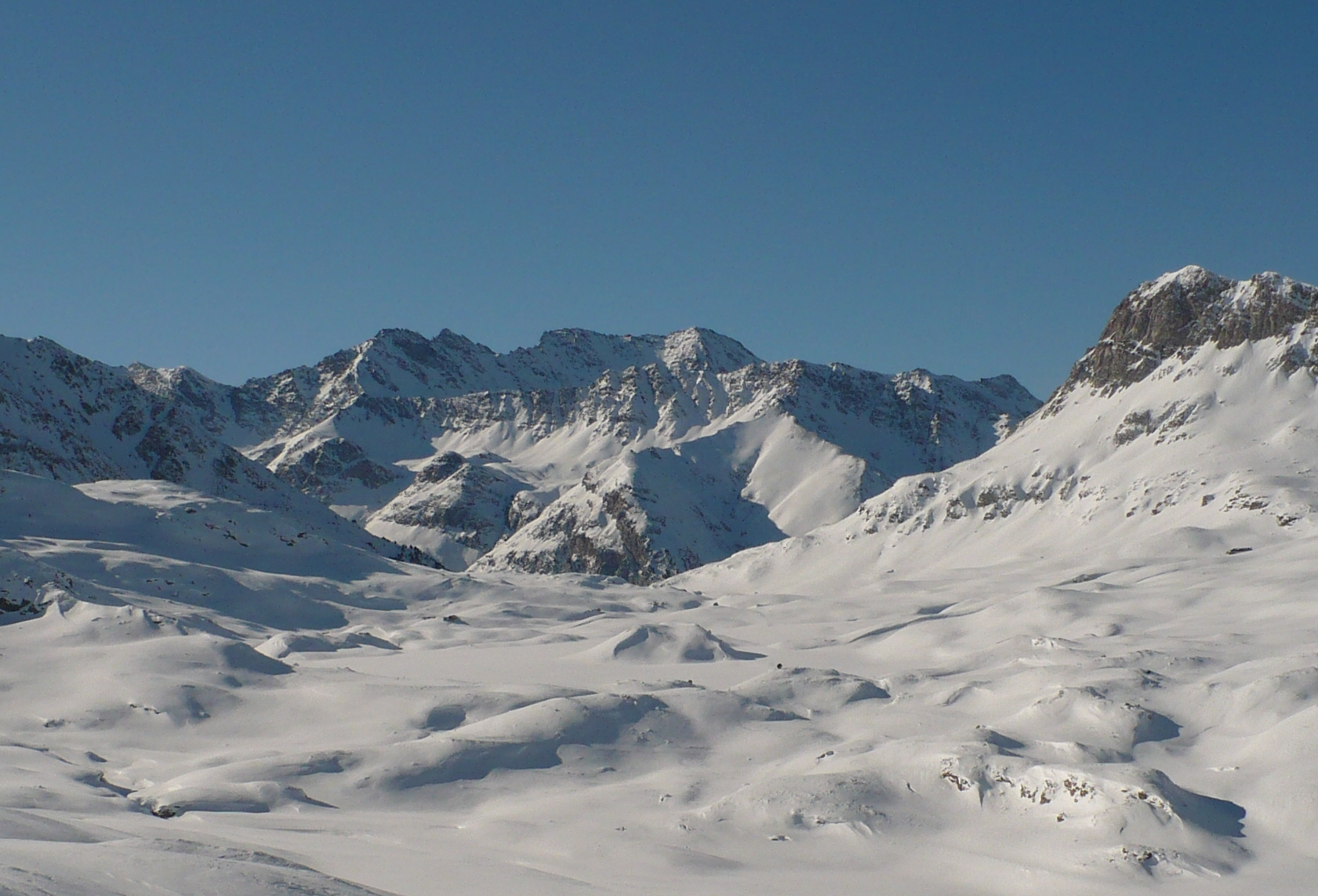
Petit Mont Cenis Pass

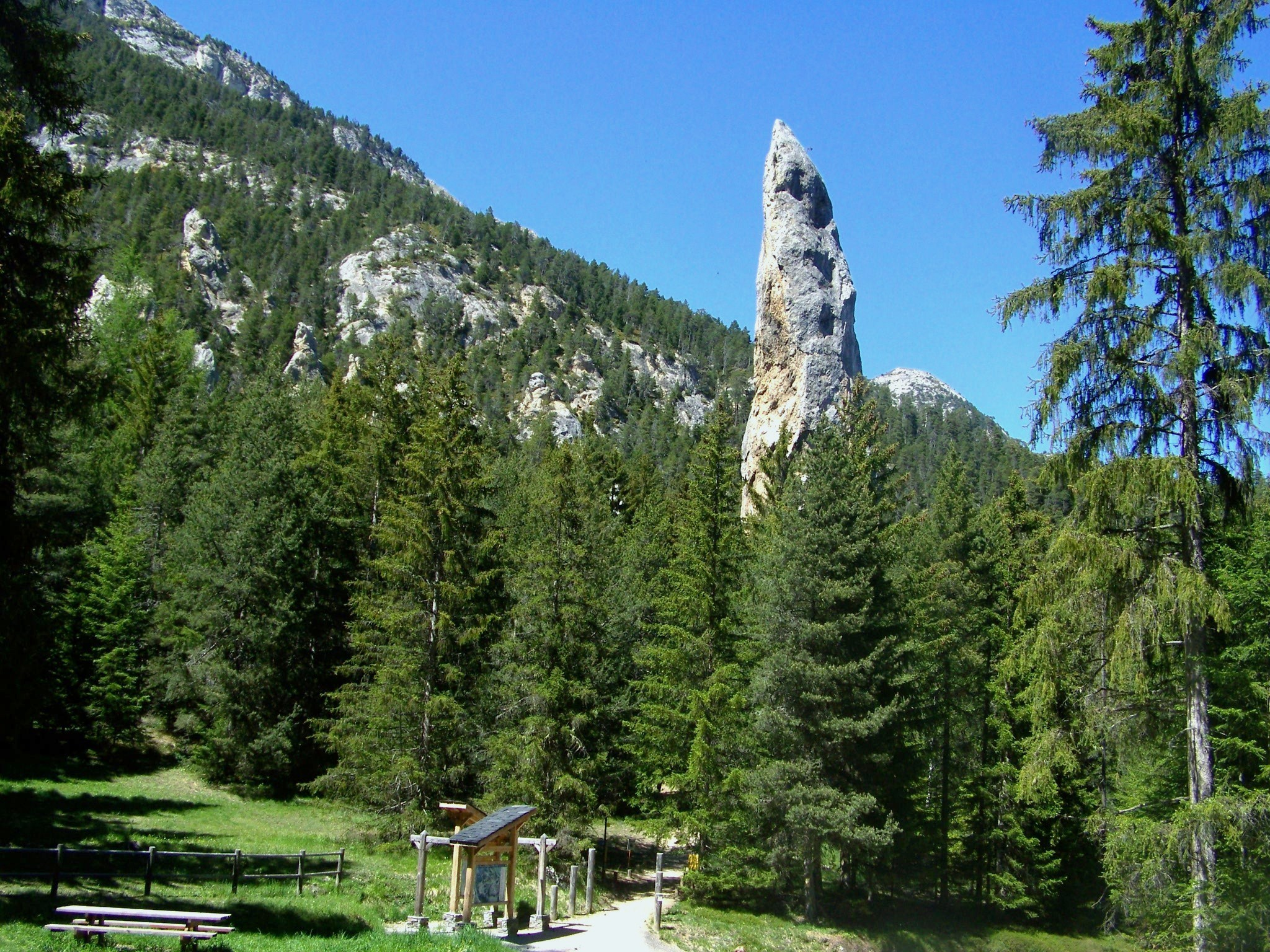
Monolithe of Sardières (93 m)

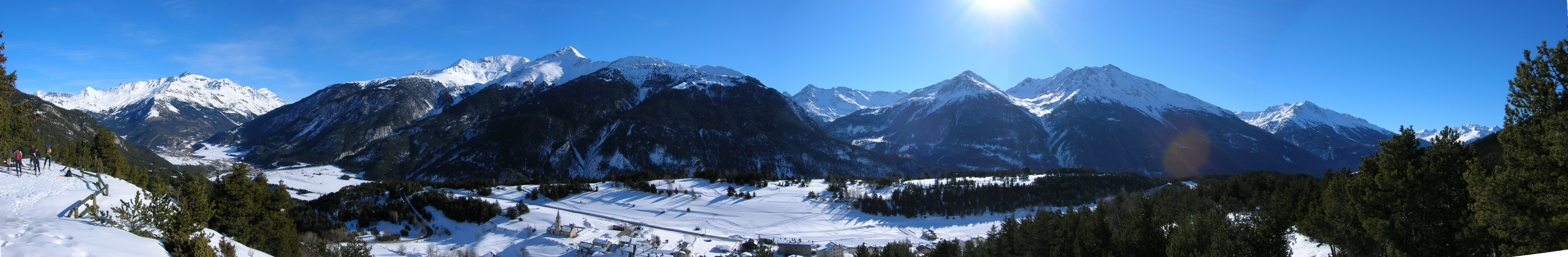
Panoramic view of the massifs of Mont Cenis and Ambin

== See also ==
- Communes of the Savoie department
