= Lanslebourg-Mont-Cenis =

Lanslebourg-Mont-Cenis Linbork (Savoyard)
- Part of Val-Cenis
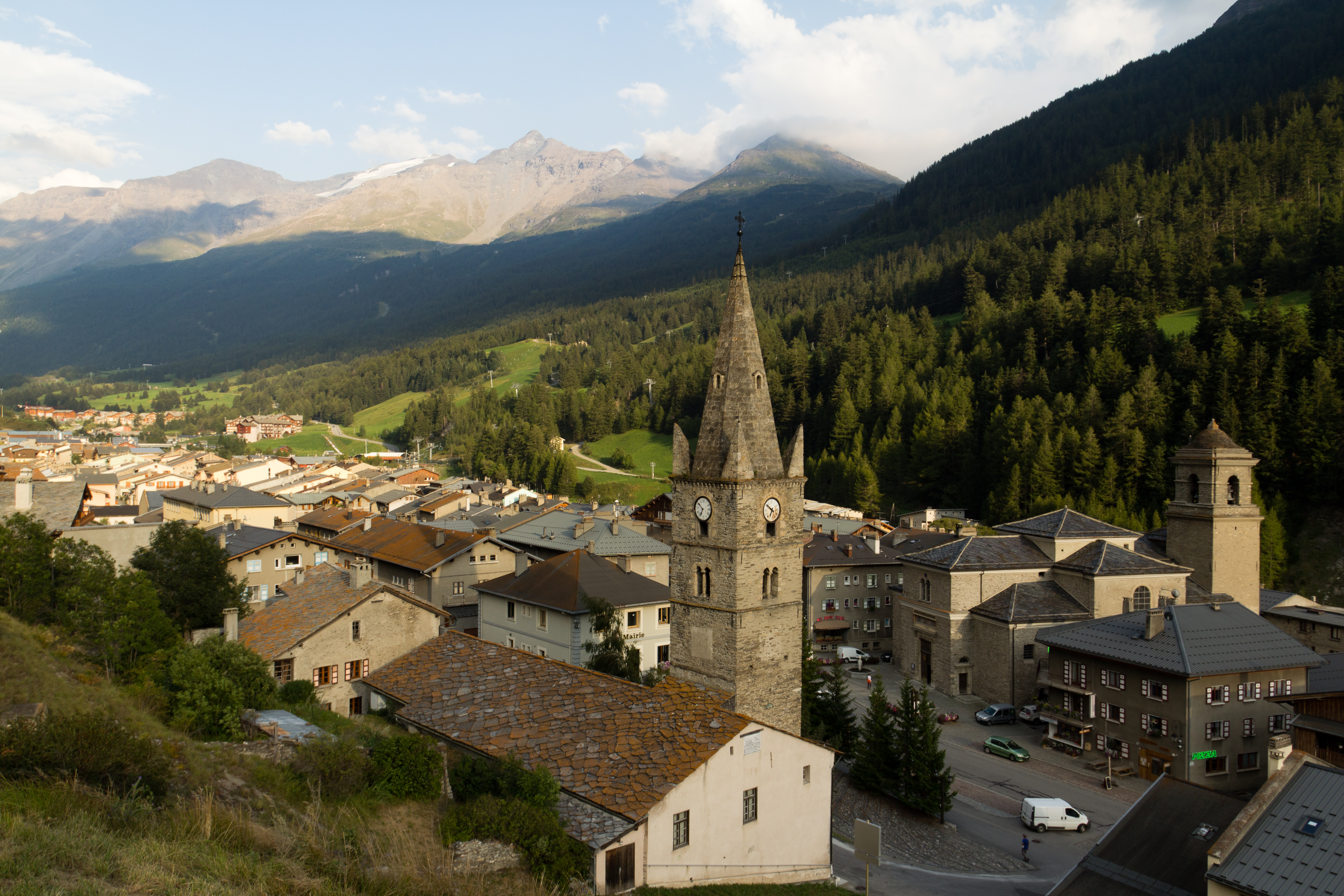
- A overall view of Lanslebourg-Mont-Cenis

- Coat of arms
- Location of Lanslebourg-Mont-Cenis
- Location within France Location within Auvergne-Rhône-Alpes
- Coordinates: 45°17′11″N 6°52′48″E
- Country: France
- Region: Auvergne-Rhône-Alpes
- Department: Savoie
- Arrondissement: Saint-Jean-de-Maurienne
- Canton: Modane
- Commune: Val-Cenis
- Area^{1}: 93.61 km^{2} (36.14 sq mi)
- Highest elevation: 3,609 m (11,841 ft)
- Lowest elevation: 1,356 m (4,449 ft)
- Population (2022): 620
  - Density: 6.6/km^{2} (17/sq mi)
- Time zone: UTC+01:00 (CET)
  - Summer (DST): UTC+02:00 (CEST)
- Postal code: 73480
- Website: www.lanslebourg-montcenis.fr
- ^{1} French Land Register data, which excludes lakes, ponds, glaciers > 1 km^{2} (0.386 sq mi or 247 acres) and river estuaries.

Lanslebourg-Mont-Cenis (Savoyard: Linbork) is a former commune in the Savoie department in the Auvergne-Rhône-Alpes region in south-eastern France. On 1 January 2017, it was merged into the new commune Val-Cenis.

== Points of interest ==
- Jardin botanique de Mont Cenis
- Mont Cenis
- Val Cenis Vanoise ski resort

== See also ==
- Communes of the Savoie department
