= Termignon =

Termignon Trémyon (Savoyard)
- Part of Val-Cenis
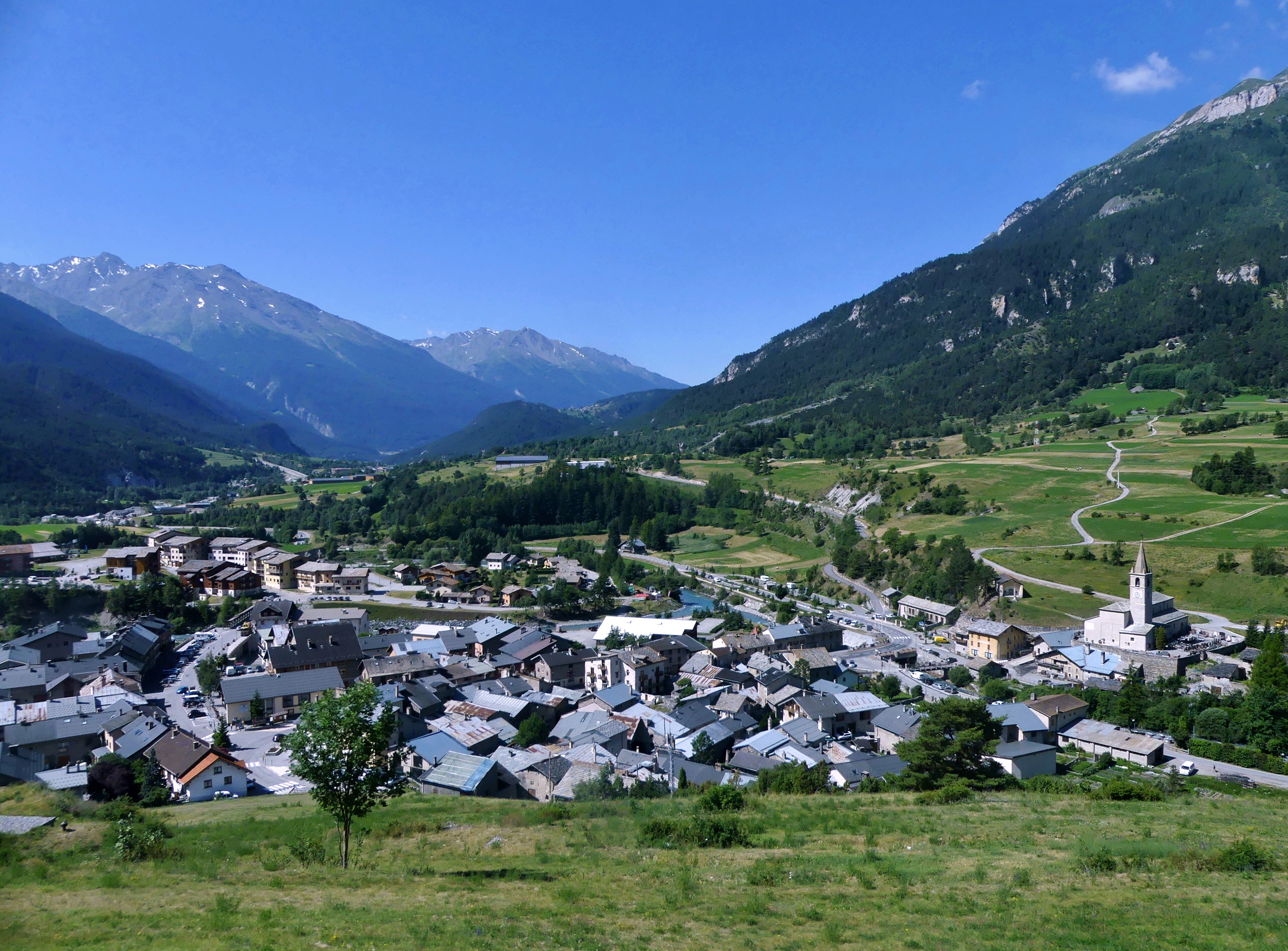
- Termignon in summer.
- Location of Termignon
- Location within France Location within Auvergne-Rhône-Alpes
- Coordinates: 45°16′42″N 6°49′04″E
- Country: France
- Region: Auvergne-Rhône-Alpes
- Department: Savoie
- Arrondissement: Saint-Jean-de-Maurienne
- Canton: Modane
- Commune: Val-Cenis
- Area^{1}: 149.03 km^{2} (57.54 sq mi)
- Highest elevation: 3,855 m (12,648 ft)
- Lowest elevation: 1,277 m (4,190 ft)
- Population (2022): 374
  - Density: 2.51/km^{2} (6.50/sq mi)
- Time zone: UTC+01:00 (CET)
  - Summer (DST): UTC+02:00 (CEST)
- Postal code: 73500
- ^{1} French Land Register data, which excludes lakes, ponds, glaciers > 1 km^{2} (0.386 sq mi or 247 acres) and river estuaries.

Termignon (Savoyard: Trémyon) is a former commune in the Savoie department in the Auvergne-Rhône-Alpes region in south-eastern France. On 1 January 2017, it was merged into the new commune Val-Cenis. It is ideally located in the Maurienne region with good transport links in and out of Modane, Lyon, Geneva and Chambéry.

== Geography ==
=== Climate ===
Termignon has a humid continental climate (Köppen climate classification Dfb). The average annual temperature in Termignon is 7.4 °C (45.3 °F). The average annual rainfall is 659.1 mm (25.95 in) with November as the wettest month. The temperatures are highest on average in July, at around 16.5 °C (61.7 °F), and lowest in January, at around −1.5 °C (29.3 °F). The highest temperature ever recorded in Termignon was 34.7 °C (94.5 °F) on 27 June 2019; the coldest temperature ever recorded was −27.4 °C (−17.3 °F) on 3 February 1956.

Climate data for Termignon (1991−2020 normals, extremes 1934−present)
Month	Jan	Feb	Mar	Apr	May	Jun	Jul	Aug	Sep	Oct	Nov	Dec	Year
Record high °C (°F)	16.2 (61.2)	18.8 (65.8)	21.0 (69.8)	27.0 (80.6)	29.3 (84.7)	34.7 (94.5)	34.3 (93.7)	34.3 (93.7)	30.0 (86.0)	27.5 (81.5)	21.5 (70.7)	15.1 (59.2)	34.7 (94.5)
Mean daily maximum °C (°F)	3.5 (38.3)	5.1 (41.2)	9.1 (48.4)	12.4 (54.3)	16.8 (62.2)	21.2 (70.2)	23.7 (74.7)	23.4 (74.1)	18.7 (65.7)	14.4 (57.9)	8.0 (46.4)	3.6 (38.5)	13.3 (55.9)
Daily mean °C (°F)	−1.5 (29.3)	−0.6 (30.9)	3.3 (37.9)	6.6 (43.9)	10.8 (51.4)	14.5 (58.1)	16.5 (61.7)	16.3 (61.3)	12.4 (54.3)	8.4 (47.1)	3.1 (37.6)	−0.8 (30.6)	7.4 (45.3)
Mean daily minimum °C (°F)	−6.4 (20.5)	−6.2 (20.8)	−2.4 (27.7)	0.8 (33.4)	4.7 (40.5)	7.8 (46.0)	9.4 (48.9)	9.2 (48.6)	6.1 (43.0)	2.5 (36.5)	−1.8 (28.8)	−5.3 (22.5)	1.5 (34.7)
Record low °C (°F)	−24.0 (−11.2)	−27.4 (−17.3)	−20.2 (−4.4)	−12.6 (9.3)	−7.8 (18.0)	−2.7 (27.1)	−1.5 (29.3)	−1.6 (29.1)	−4.9 (23.2)	−9.8 (14.4)	−17.9 (−0.2)	−21.0 (−5.8)	−27.4 (−17.3)
Average precipitation mm (inches)	54.2 (2.13)	41.2 (1.62)	44.8 (1.76)	50.3 (1.98)	65.7 (2.59)	56.6 (2.23)	46.5 (1.83)	51.3 (2.02)	50.8 (2.00)	61.2 (2.41)	72.3 (2.85)	64.2 (2.53)	659.1 (25.95)
Average precipitation days (≥ 1.0 mm)	7.2	6.9	6.8	7.2	8.7	8.5	7.8	7.9	7.2	7.2	8.3	8.5	92.2
Source: Météo-France

== Economy ==
The famous but rare and expensive Bleu de Termignon cheese is made in Termignon.

== See also ==
- Communes of the Savoie department
