= Canton of Modane =

Coordinates: 45.20°N 6.67°E

The canton of Modane is an administrative division of the Savoie department, southeastern France. Its borders were modified at the French canton reorganisation which came into effect in March 2015. Its seat is in Modane.

It consists of the following communes:

1. Aussois
2. Avrieux
3. Bessans
4. Bonneval-sur-Arc
5. Fourneaux
6. Freney
7. Modane
8. Orelle
9. Saint-André
10. Saint-Martin-d'Arc
11. Saint-Martin-de-la-Porte
12. Saint-Michel-de-Maurienne
13. Val-Cenis
14. Valloire
15. Valmeinier
16. Villarodin-Bourget
