= Ouvrage Saint-Antoine =

- Part of Maginot Line, Alpine Line
- Southeast France
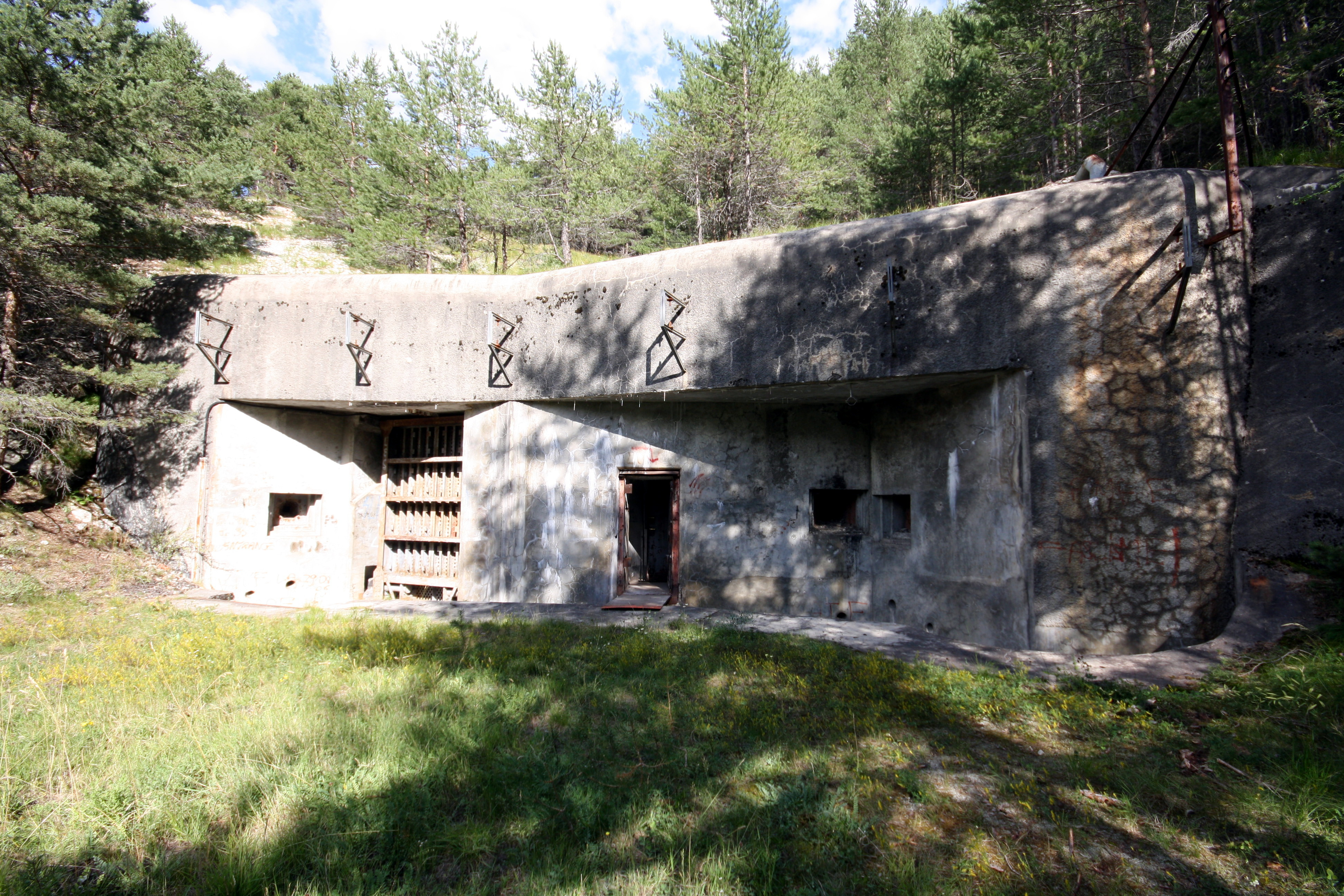

Site information
- Controlled by: France

Location
- Coordinates: 45.16534°N 6.68°E

Site history
- Built by: CORF
- In use: Abandoned
- Materials: Concrete, steel, rock excavation
- Battles/wars: Italian invasion of France

Ouvrage Saint-Antoine is a work (gros ouvrage) of the Maginot Line's Alpine extension, the Alpine Line. The ouvrage consists of one entry block, one infantry block and one artillery block overlooking Modane on the way to the Col du Mont Cenis. Ouvrage Saint-Gobain is just to the north, across the mountain valley. Saint-Antoine overlooks the approaches to the Fréjus Rail Tunnel and was part of an ensemble of forts, including Saint-Gobain, Ouvrage Sapey and Fort du Replaton that guarded the French end of the tunnel and the descent from the Mont Cenis pass.

== Description ==
- Block 1 (artillery): two machine gun cloches, two 75mm gun embrasures and four 81mm mortar embrasures.
- Block 2 (infantry): one observation gun cloche and two heavy twin machine embrasures.
- Block 3 (entry): one machine gun embrasure and one heavy twin machine gun/47mm anti-tank gun embrasure.

A casemate is located nearby, but not connected to the underground gallery network. It is the only CORF-design casemate in the southeastern fortifications. It is equipped with one machine gun cloche, two machine gun embrasures and two heavy twin machine gun embrasures.

== History ==
Saint-Antoine saw no significant action during the 1940 Italian invasion of France. In 1944, Saint-Antoine, which had been disarmed and occupied by the Germans, was recaptured relatively easily on 13 September. The fortifications of the Maurienne had suffered little damage during the war and by the end of 1944 were partly repaired and placed into service. Immediately after the war, the Maurienne region was regarded as an area of medium priority for restoration and reuse by the military. By the 1950s the positions in the Southeast of France were restored and operational again. However, by 1960, with France's acquisition of nuclear weapons, the cost and effectiveness of the Maginot system was called into question. Between 1964 and 1971 nearly all of the Maginot fortifications were deactivated.

== See also ==
- List of Alpine Line ouvrages

== Bibliography ==
- Allcorn, William. The Maginot Line 1928-45. Oxford: Osprey Publishing, 2003. ISBN 1-84176-646-1
- Kaufmann, J.E. and Kaufmann, H.W. Fortress France: The Maginot Line and French Defenses in World War II, Stackpole Books, 2006. ISBN 0-275-98345-5
- Kaufmann, J.E., Kaufmann, H.W., Jancovič-Potočnik, A. and Lang, P. The Maginot Line: History and Guide, Pen and Sword, 2011. ISBN 978-1-84884-068-3
- Mary, Jean-Yves; Hohnadel, Alain; Sicard, Jacques. Hommes et Ouvrages de la Ligne Maginot, Tome 1. Paris, Histoire & Collections, 2001. ISBN 2-908182-88-2 (in French)
- Mary, Jean-Yves; Hohnadel, Alain; Sicard, Jacques. Hommes et Ouvrages de la Ligne Maginot, Tome 4 - La fortification alpine. Paris, Histoire & Collections, 2009. ISBN 978-2-915239-46-1 (in French)
- Mary, Jean-Yves; Hohnadel, Alain; Sicard, Jacques. Hommes et Ouvrages de la Ligne Maginot, Tome 5. Paris, Histoire & Collections, 2009. ISBN 978-2-35250-127-5 (in French)
