= Ouvrage Saint-Gobain =

- Part of Maginot Line, Alpine Line
- Southeast France
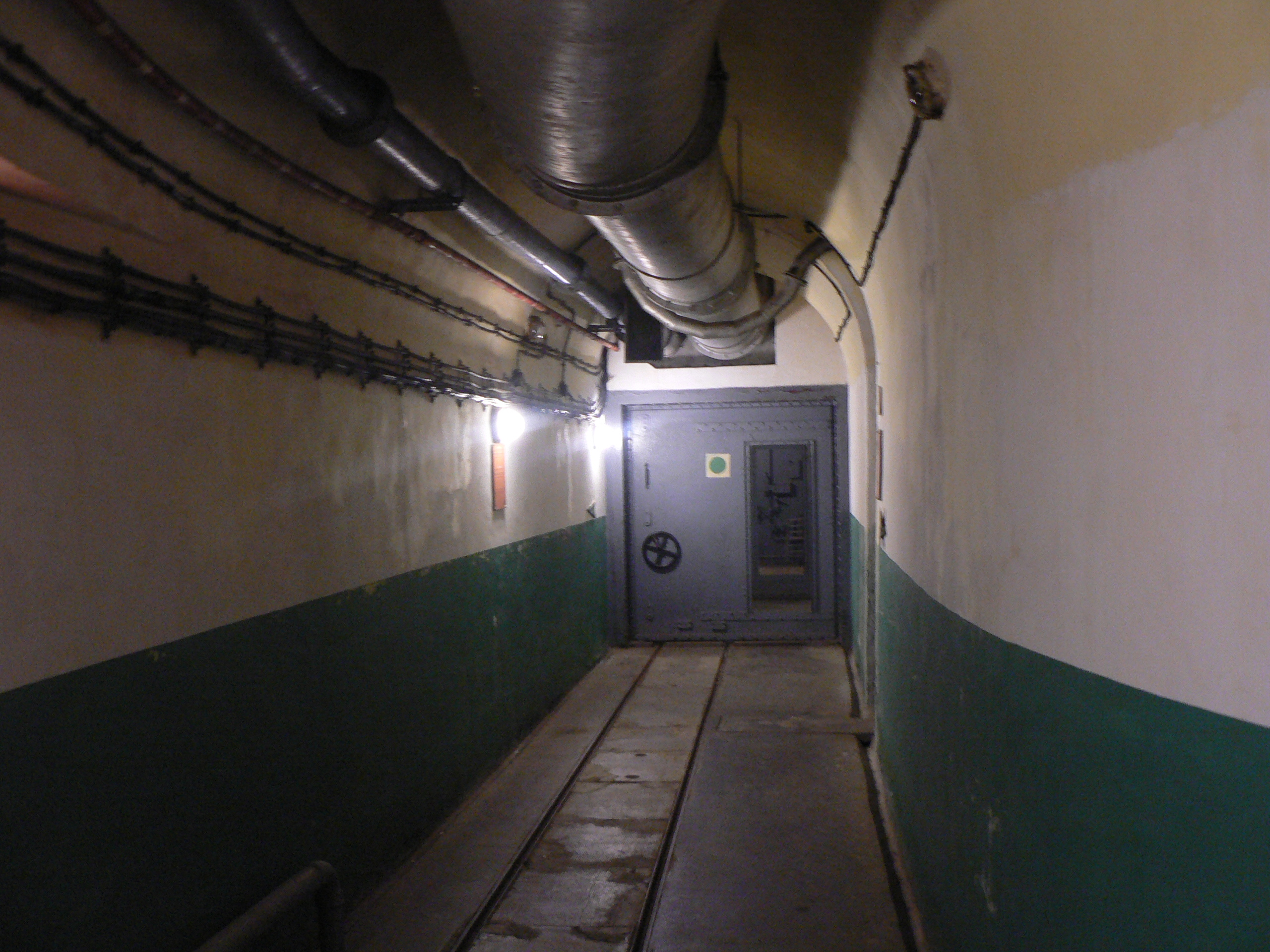
- Interior gallery, 60 cm rail line and blast door

Site information
- Controlled by: France
- Open to the public: Yes

Location
- Coordinates: 45.20818°N 6.68186°E

Site history
- Built: 1931
- Built by: CORF
- In use: Preserved
- Materials: Concrete, steel, rock excavation
- Battles/wars: Italian invasion of France

Ouvrage Saint-Gobain is a work (gros ouvrage) of the Maginot Line's Alpine extension, the Alpine Line. The ouvrage consists of one entry block, one infantry block, one artillery block, one observation block and one combination block. Located in Modane, France, it is just across the valley of the Arc from Ouvrage Saint-Antoine and somewhat to the east of Ouvrage Sapey.

The ouvrage covers the approach to the Fréjus Rail Tunnel and the N6 road. In 1940 it had a garrison of 154 under Captain Dutrey. It cost 12.2 million francs.

== Description ==
- Block 1 (artillery): one machine gun cloche and one 81mm mortar embrasure.
- Block 2 (artillery): one machine gun cloche, cone heavy twin machine gun cloche two 81mm mortar embrasures, one heavy twin machine gun embrasure and one heavy twin machine gun/47mm anti-tank gun embrasure.
- Block 3 (observation): one machine gun cloche, one machine gun embrasure and one observation embrasure.
- Block 4 (infantry): one machine gun cloche, one heavy twin machine gun embrasure.
- Entry: one machine gun cloche, one heavy twin machine gun/37mm anti-tank gun embrasure.

== History ==
Saint-Gobain participated in artillery fire directed at Italian troops in the Italian invasion of France in 1940 only indirectly, when one of its observation blocks spotted the fall of shot from Ouvrage Sapey in the morning hours of June 21 against an Italian observation post.

After the 1940 armistice, Italian forces occupied the Alpine ouvrages and disarmed them. In August 1943, southern France was occupied by the German 19th Army, which took over many of the Alpine positions that had been occupied by the Italians until Italy's withdrawal from the war in September 1943.

In 1944, Saint-Gobain was recaptured relatively easily on 13 September. The Modane end of the Fréjus Tunnel was blown up by the retreating Germans, leaving a tilted blockhouse by the railway line, now known as the "Tilted House." Saint-Gobain had suffered little damage during the war and by the end of 1944 was partly repaired and placed into service. Immediately after the war, the Maurienne region was regarded as an area of medium priority for restoration and reuse by the military. By the 1950s the positions in the Southeast of France were restored and operational again. However, by 1960, with France's acquisition of nuclear weapons, the cost and effectiveness of the Maginot system was called into question. Between 1964 and 1971 nearly all of the Maginot fortifications were deactivated.

Ouvrage Saint-Gobain is open for public visitation, maintained by the Association du Musée de la Traverse des Alpes.

== See also ==
- List of Alpine Line ouvrages
- Fort du Replaton

== Bibliography ==
- Allcorn, William. The Maginot Line 1928-45. Oxford: Osprey Publishing, 2003. ISBN 1-84176-646-1
- Kaufmann, J.E. and Kaufmann, H.W. Fortress France: The Maginot Line and French Defenses in World War II, Stackpole Books, 2006. ISBN 0-275-98345-5
- Kaufmann, J.E., Kaufmann, H.W., Jancovič-Potočnik, A. and Lang, P. The Maginot Line: History and Guide, Pen and Sword, 2011. ISBN 978-1-84884-068-3
- Mary, Jean-Yves; Hohnadel, Alain; Sicard, Jacques. Hommes et Ouvrages de la Ligne Maginot, Tome 1. Paris, Histoire & Collections, 2001. ISBN 2-908182-88-2 (in French)
- Mary, Jean-Yves; Hohnadel, Alain; Sicard, Jacques. Hommes et Ouvrages de la Ligne Maginot, Tome 4 - La fortification alpine. Paris, Histoire & Collections, 2009. ISBN 978-2-915239-46-1 (in French)
- Mary, Jean-Yves; Hohnadel, Alain; Sicard, Jacques. Hommes et Ouvrages de la Ligne Maginot, Tome 5. Paris, Histoire & Collections, 2009. ISBN 978-2-35250-127-5 (in French)
