= Modane =

Modane Modâna (Savoyard) Modana (Italian)
- Commune
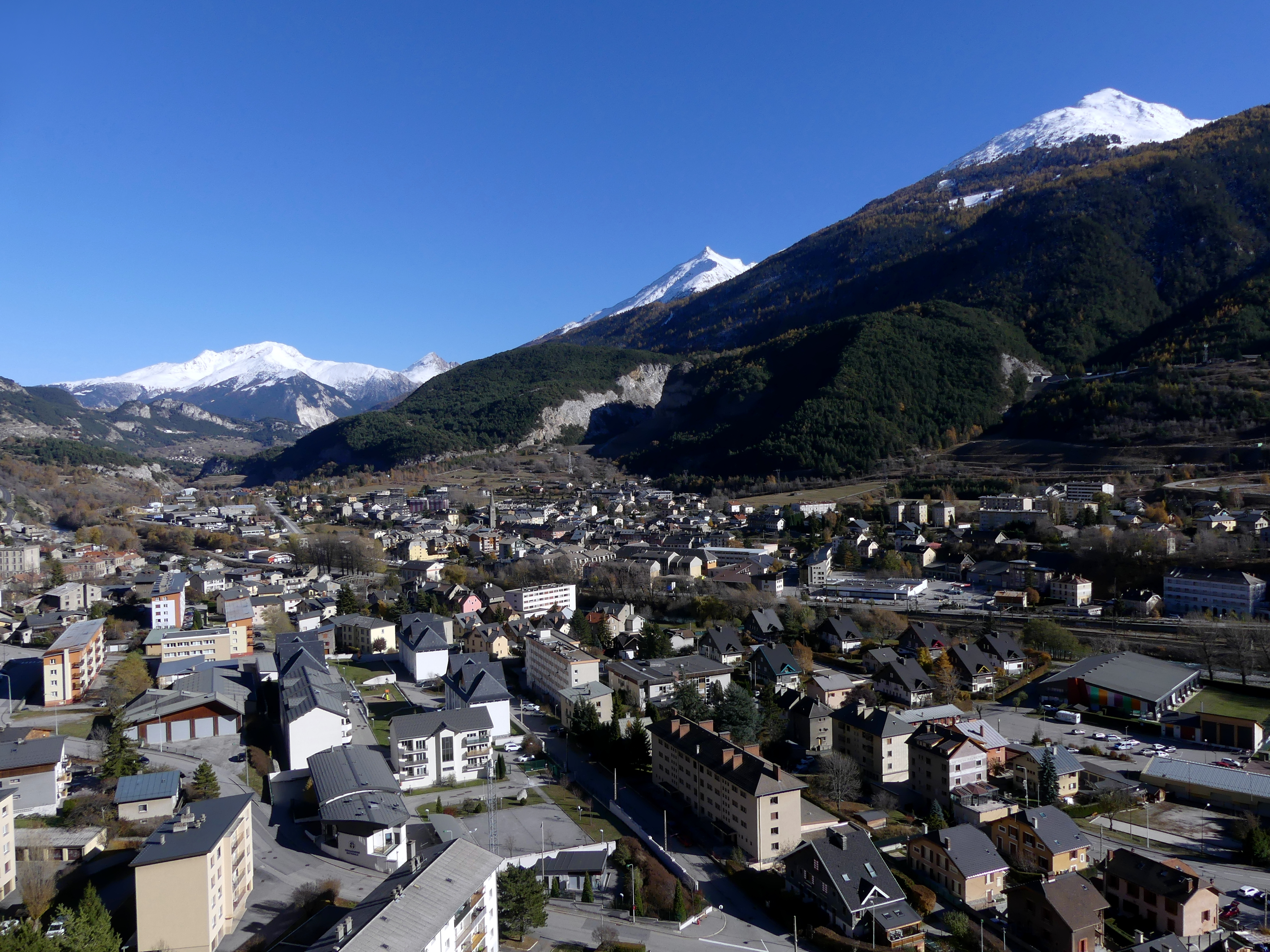
- A view of east Modane (from Loutraz)

- Coat of arms
- Location of Modane
- Location within France Location within Auvergne-Rhône-Alpes
- Coordinates: 45°12′08″N 6°40′25″E
- Country: France
- Region: Auvergne-Rhône-Alpes
- Department: Savoie
- Arrondissement: Saint-Jean-de-Maurienne
- Canton: Modane

Government
  - Mayor (2020–2026): Jean-Claude Raffin
- Area^{1}: 71.04 km^{2} (27.43 sq mi)
- Elevation: 1,067 m (3,501 ft)
- Highest elevation: 3,560 m (11,680 ft)
- Lowest elevation: 1,054 m (3,458 ft)
- Population (2023): 2,849
  - Density: 40.10/km^{2} (103.9/sq mi)
- Time zone: UTC+01:00 (CET)
  - Summer (DST): UTC+02:00 (CEST)
- INSEE/Postal code: 73157 /73500
- Website: https://www.modane.fr
- ^{1} French Land Register data, which excludes lakes, ponds, glaciers > 1 km^{2} (0.386 sq mi or 247 acres) and river estuaries.

Modane (French pronunciation: [mɔ.dan]; Savoyard: Modâna; Italian: Modana) is a commune in the Savoie department in the Auvergne-Rhône-Alpes region in southeastern France.

The commune is in the Maurienne Valley, and it also belongs to the Vanoise National Park. It was part of the Kingdom of Sardinia until the Treaty of Turin in 1860.

== Geography ==
=== Location ===
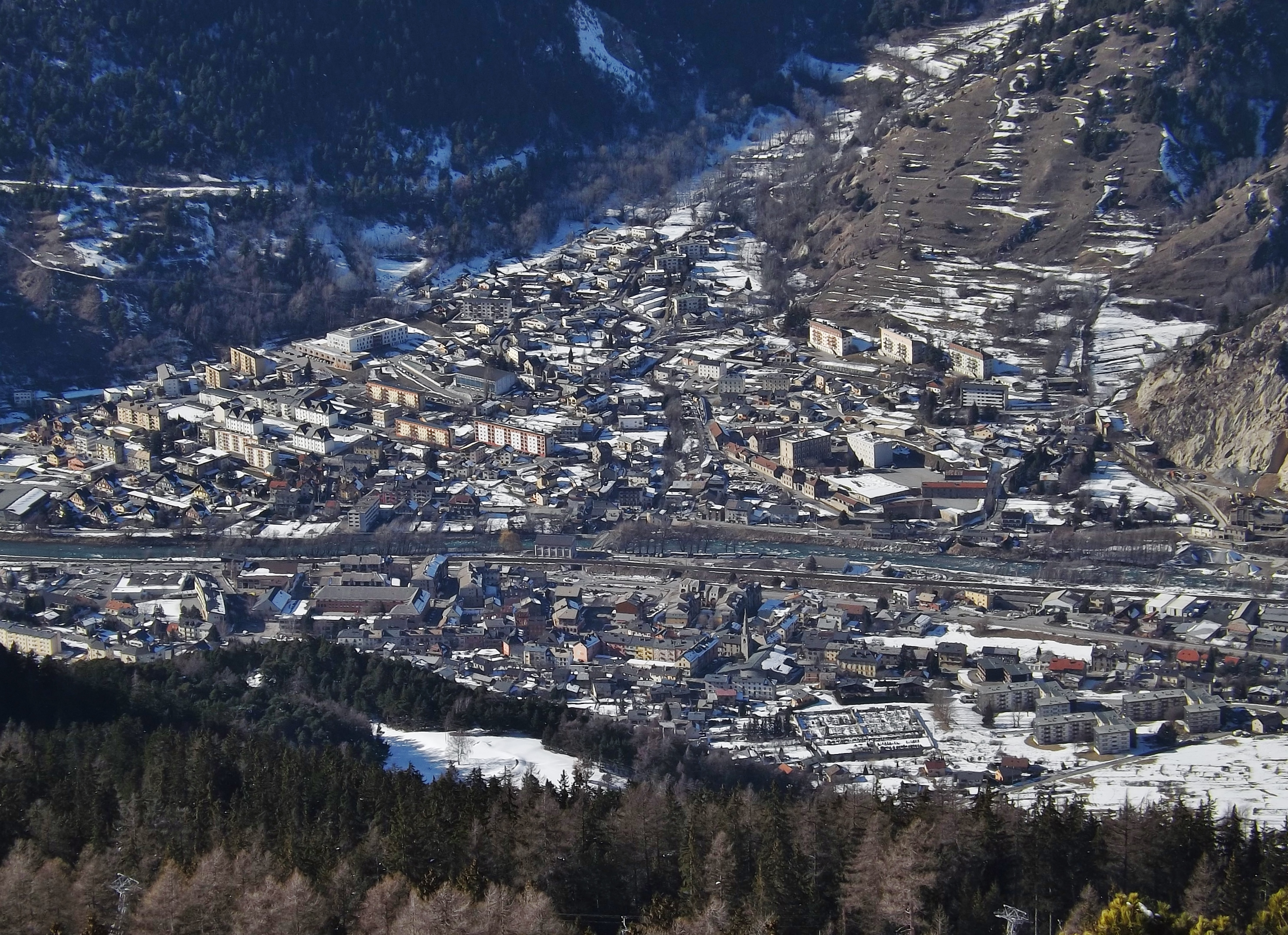
View of Modane from La Norma.

The commune of Modane is located in the Alps in the department of Savoie between the Vanoise Massif to the north and between the Massif du Mont-Cenis and the Massif des Cerces to the south. Crossed by the Arc river, it extends to the doors of the Haute-Maurienne. The issue of the attachment or not of Modane in the Maurienne Valley or Haute-Maurienne differs depending on the disciplines of economics, geography or geology. For economists, Modane is attached to Haute Maurienne, arguing that the city has a very strong influence on the villages of Haute Maurienne, through economic and administrative infrastructure such as shopping centres, schools or the railway station for example. However, for the great majority of analysts, Modane is a commune attached to the middle part of this valley, both by the relief (encompassing the whole canton is a dug coal-bearing furrow which extends to Saint-Michel-de-Maurienne), and by the industrial history of this sector.

With an area of 7,104 acres (2,875 ha) [28.74 square kilometres (11.10 sq mi)], the commune extends along a north–south axis on both sides of the valley. To the north, Modane is bounded by the Roc des Saints Pères, and the Aiguille de Péclet (northwest) and the Dôme de Polset (northeast). To the south, also from west to east, these are the Refuge du Mont Thabor (marking the boundary with the department of Hautes-Alpes), the Cime de la Planette, the Pointe du Fréjus and the Cime du Grand Vallon (marking the boundary with Italy) which delimit the neighbouring communes of Modane and Italy.

The Modane territory extends in a particular form. Indeed, a relatively short east–west width on the north side of the valley (a few hundred meters to a maximum of 5 kilometres (3.1 mi) between the peaks), is much larger on the south side (about 2 to 8 kilometres (1.2 to 5.0 mi) from the South shore of the CRA to peaks). From north to south, the municipality extends however over a length of around 15 kilometres (9.3 mi).

In Vanoise, the town is dominated by the Dent Parrachée at 3,697 metres (12,129 ft), the Pointe de l'Échelle at 3,427 metres (11,243 ft), the Rateau d'Aussois at 3,117 metres (10,226 ft), the Aiguille Doran at 3,039 metres (9,970 ft), the Dôme de Polset at 3,566 metres (11,699 ft) or the Pointe Rénod at 3,374 metres (11,070 ft). To the south stand the Pointe de Longecôte at 3,100 metres (10,200 ft), the Aiguille de Scolette at 3,508 metres (11,509 ft), the Belle Plinier at 3,076 metres (10,092 ft), the Pointe d’Arrondaz at 2,937 metres (9,636 ft) and also the Pointe du Fréjus at 2,934 metres (9,626 ft).

These peaks, however, leave easy passages, particularly frequented during summer by hiking tourists, either to the Tarentaise Valley or to Italy. In addition, some welcome ski resorts located within walking distance of the town, among which are Aussois, La Norma and Valfréjus.

=== Climate ===
According to the Köppen climate classification, Modane features a continental mountain climate (Köppen: Dfb), with long, snowy and very cold winters and warm, somewhat dry summers.

Climate data for Modane (altitude 1228m, 1981–2010 normals, extremes 1985–2014)
Month	Jan	Feb	Mar	Apr	May	Jun	Jul	Aug	Sep	Oct	Nov	Dec	Year
Record high °C (°F)	10.6 (51.1)	13.7 (56.7)	19.8 (67.6)	23.9 (75.0)	29.8 (85.6)	31.7 (89.1)	32.3 (90.1)	33.1 (91.6)	29.1 (84.4)	24.1 (75.4)	18.0 (64.4)	14.5 (58.1)	33.1 (91.6)
Mean daily maximum °C (°F)	1.3 (34.3)	3.2 (37.8)	8.0 (46.4)	11.3 (52.3)	16.8 (62.2)	19.8 (67.6)	22.5 (72.5)	22.2 (72.0)	17.7 (63.9)	12.7 (54.9)	5.0 (41.0)	1.8 (35.2)	11.9 (53.4)
Daily mean °C (°F)	−1.4 (29.5)	−0.4 (31.3)	3.3 (37.9)	6.4 (43.5)	11.4 (52.5)	14.4 (57.9)	16.9 (62.4)	16.6 (61.9)	12.8 (55.0)	8.7 (47.7)	2.2 (36.0)	−0.8 (30.6)	7.6 (45.7)
Mean daily minimum °C (°F)	−4.1 (24.6)	−4.1 (24.6)	−1.3 (29.7)	1.4 (34.5)	6.1 (43.0)	9.0 (48.2)	11.4 (52.5)	11.1 (52.0)	8.0 (46.4)	4.6 (40.3)	−0.6 (30.9)	−3.3 (26.1)	3.2 (37.8)
Record low °C (°F)	−21.0 (−5.8)	−20.5 (−4.9)	−14.5 (5.9)	−8.5 (16.7)	−7.2 (19.0)	−0.5 (31.1)	3.1 (37.6)	2.5 (36.5)	−0.6 (30.9)	−5.9 (21.4)	−15.0 (5.0)	−17.8 (0.0)	−21.0 (−5.8)
Average precipitation mm (inches)	55.2 (2.17)	55.6 (2.19)	46.5 (1.83)	50.0 (1.97)	56.5 (2.22)	58.0 (2.28)	41.8 (1.65)	55.5 (2.19)	53.4 (2.10)	66.1 (2.60)	62.5 (2.46)	57.0 (2.24)	658.1 (25.91)
Average precipitation days (≥ 1.0 mm)	8.0	7.4	7.5	8.2	9.2	9.6	6.9	8.2	6.8	7.5	8.6	7.9	95.9
Source: Météo-France

=== Neighbouring communes ===
The commune of Modane is bordered by nine other communes in France, besides its southern limit marked by the Franco-Italian border. To the west, Modane mainly borders Saint-André and Fourneaux, but also to the south-west, Freney, Orelle, and Névache in the neighbouring department of Hautes-Alpes. To the north, in the Vanoise National Park, the bordering communes are Saint-Martin-de-Belleville to the north-west, with Les Allues and Pralognan-la-Vanoise to the north-east. To the east lies Villarodin-Bourget, with Avrieux to the south-east.

=== Routes and transportation ===
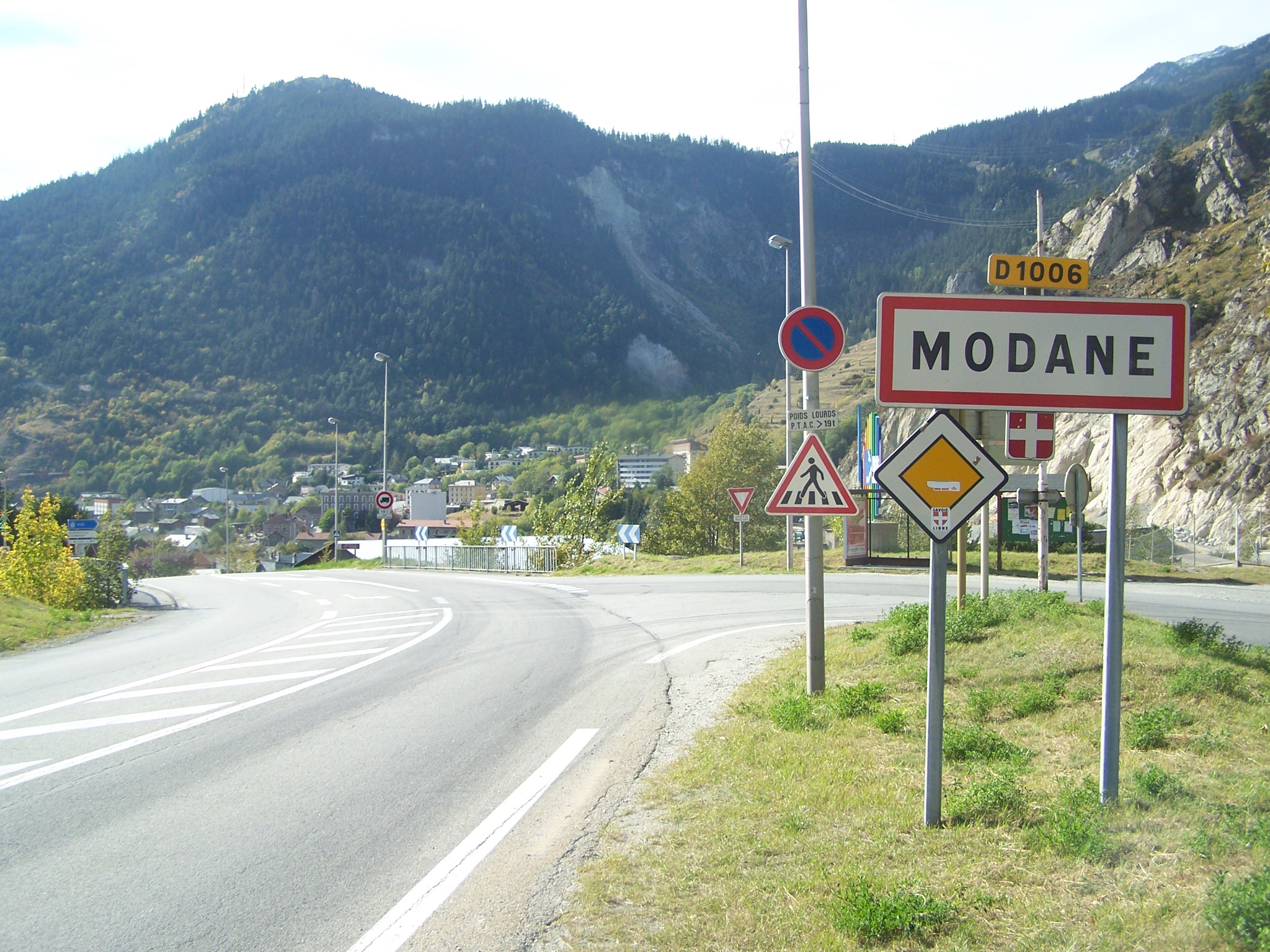
The road into Modane on the D 1006 arriving from the Col du Mont-Cenis

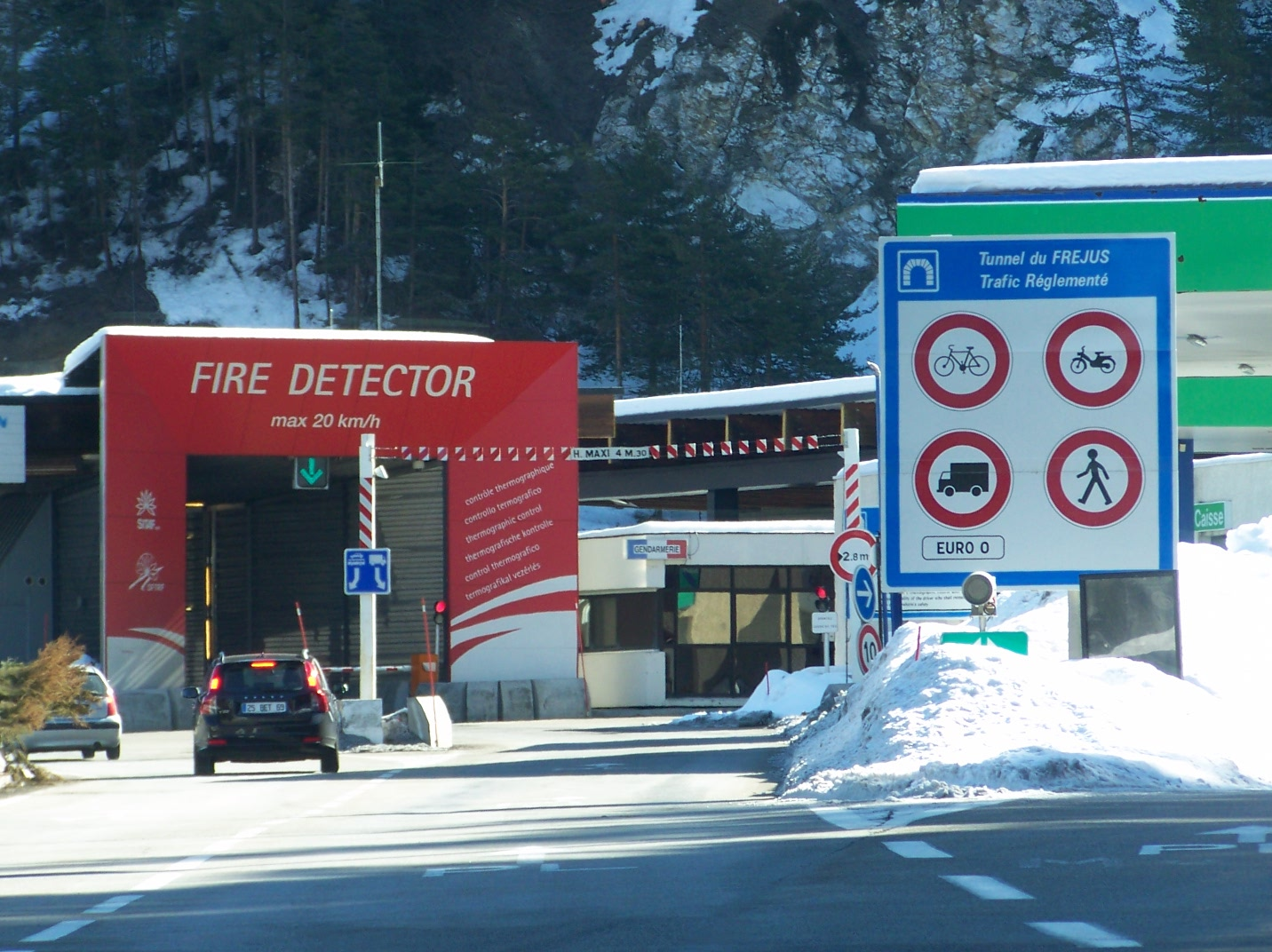
The entrance of the Fréjus Road Tunnel in Modane

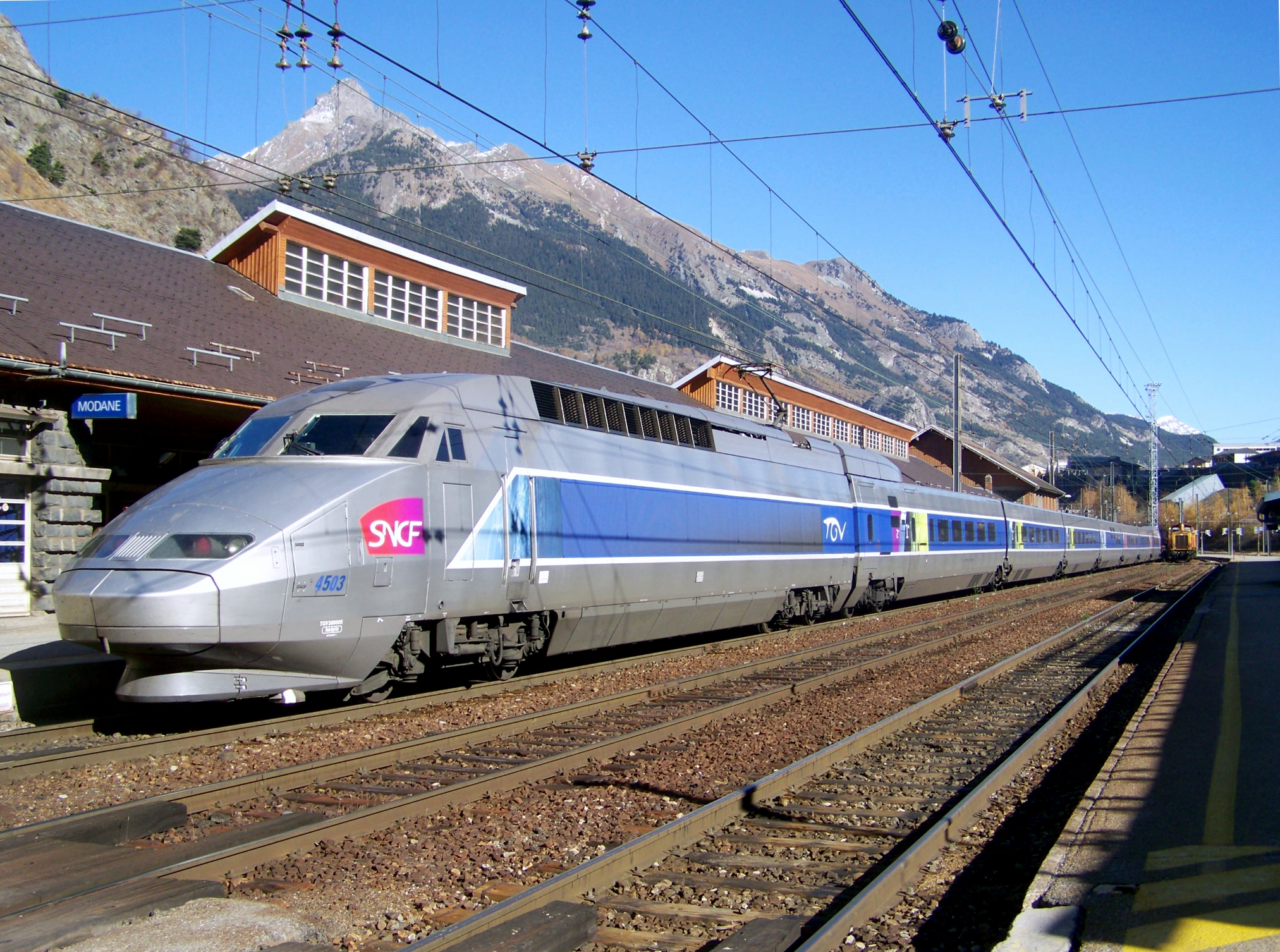
A Paris-Milan TGV in the Gare de Modane

==== Roads ====
The commune is at the French end of the Fréjus Road Tunnel, one of the major transalpine road crossings along with the Mont Blanc Tunnel, linking France and Italy. Out of the tunnel, the A43 autoroute begins and which leads to Chambéry and Lyon, also passes on the heights of the commune (in Charmaix).

In addition, the D 1006 (former Route Nationale 6), an important route coming from Chambéry, also passes through Modane before continuing up to the Col du Mont-Cenis and the Italian border. The road is also the main axis of the commune, which it crosses through the full length of the centre. However, it has several street names including, from west to east: Avenue de la Liberté, Rue de la République, Avenue Jean Jaurès and the Cours Aristide Briand.

==== Railway ====
The commune of Modane is home to an international railway station, the Gare de Modane, receiving trains from Turin in Italy, through the Fréjus Rail Tunnel, and with trains to Chambéry, as well as the TGV on the Milan (Italy) to Paris route. The whole of the French part of the line is owned by the Réseau Ferré de France (RFF), the upstream network is managed by Rete Ferroviaria Italiana, society of FS (Ferrovie dello Stato), the lower part and the station being under the management of the SNCF. There is therefore an electrical disconnection and signaling changes upstream (catenary supports also bear inscriptions in Italian).

The railway line serving Modane is the Maurienne line, or its official name the ligne de Culoz à Modane (frontière) [line of Culoz to Modane (border)]. It marks the territory of the commune of Modane looping 180° between its exit from the station and its entry into the Fréjus tunnel.

== Urbanism ==
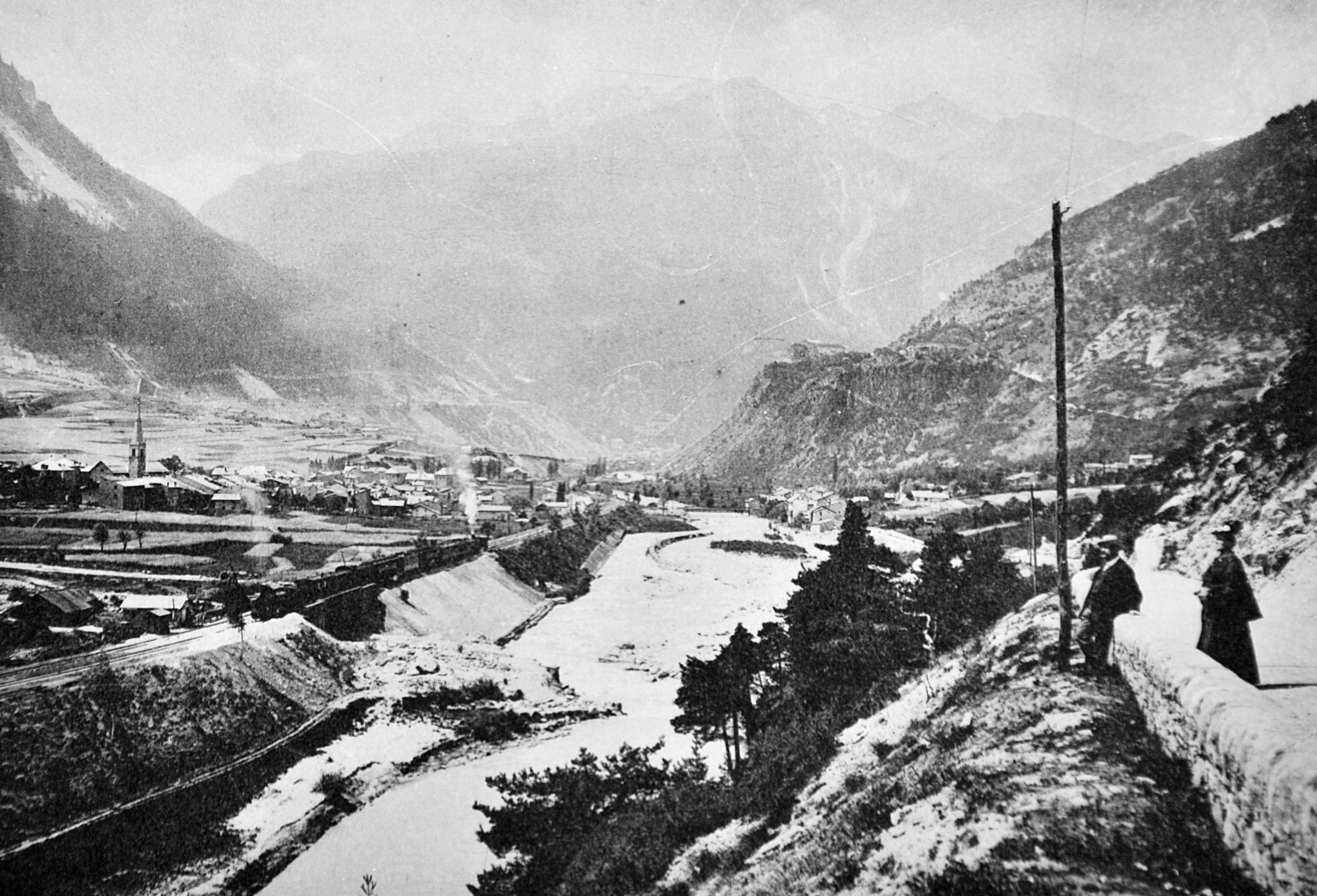
A view of Modane, circa 1920

- Rue de Chavière: A 'survivor' street of the misfortunes of the city where you can still notice some houses with half-engaged spiral staircases.
- The Le Paquier quarter: The last historic quarter of the town composed of traditional houses grouped around the parish church.

== Toponymy ==
The modern spelling Modane is not attested before circa. 1700. Previously, there were Amoudane, Amaudane, Amaldanus. The initial vowel has therefore fallen from use (taken for the preposition à [to]). The word could come from a proper name, that of the keeper of a manso, Amaudanes, mentioned in a cartulary of the 12th century.

== History ==
In 1871, following the opening of the Mont-Cenis rail tunnel Modane quickly became a border city. The Italian journey began between Italian immigration and transit trade and the population increased significantly. However, the increasingly strained relations between France and Italy lead to the construction in 1885 of the Fort du Replaton, an interdiction fort to monitor the entrance of the tunnel.

During World War I, a train carrying some 1,000 French troops from the Italian front derailed while descending a steep hill in Modane; at least half of the soldiers were killed in France's greatest rail disaster.

During World War II, the city was bombed on 13 or 17 September 1943 by Allied aircraft. The objective of the bombing was the station, an important centre of transit between France and Italy. The bombing caused 60 victims and 100 houses were destroyed. A second bombing took place on the night of 10–11 November 1943, killing five civilians.

In 1969, the city turned to tourism. A chairlift departing from Fourneaux and joining the hamlet of Charmaix on the commune of Modane, at 1,550 metres (5,090 ft) altitude, was indeed created, like the d'Arrondaz snow stadium, allowing skiing at 1,550 to 2,500 metres (5,090 to 8,200 ft) altitude.

In 1983, the promoter of Tignes, Pierre Schnebelen, created a new station from d'Arrondaz. It built the estate on the hamlet, two cable cars of 1,550 to 2,737 metres (5,085 to 8,980 ft), joining the top of Punta Bagna. A new international ski resort was created: Valfréjus (station attached to the municipality of Modane). Between 1983 and 2008, the station evolved to have 7,000 tourist beds.

== Politics and administration ==
=== Political trends and outcomes ===
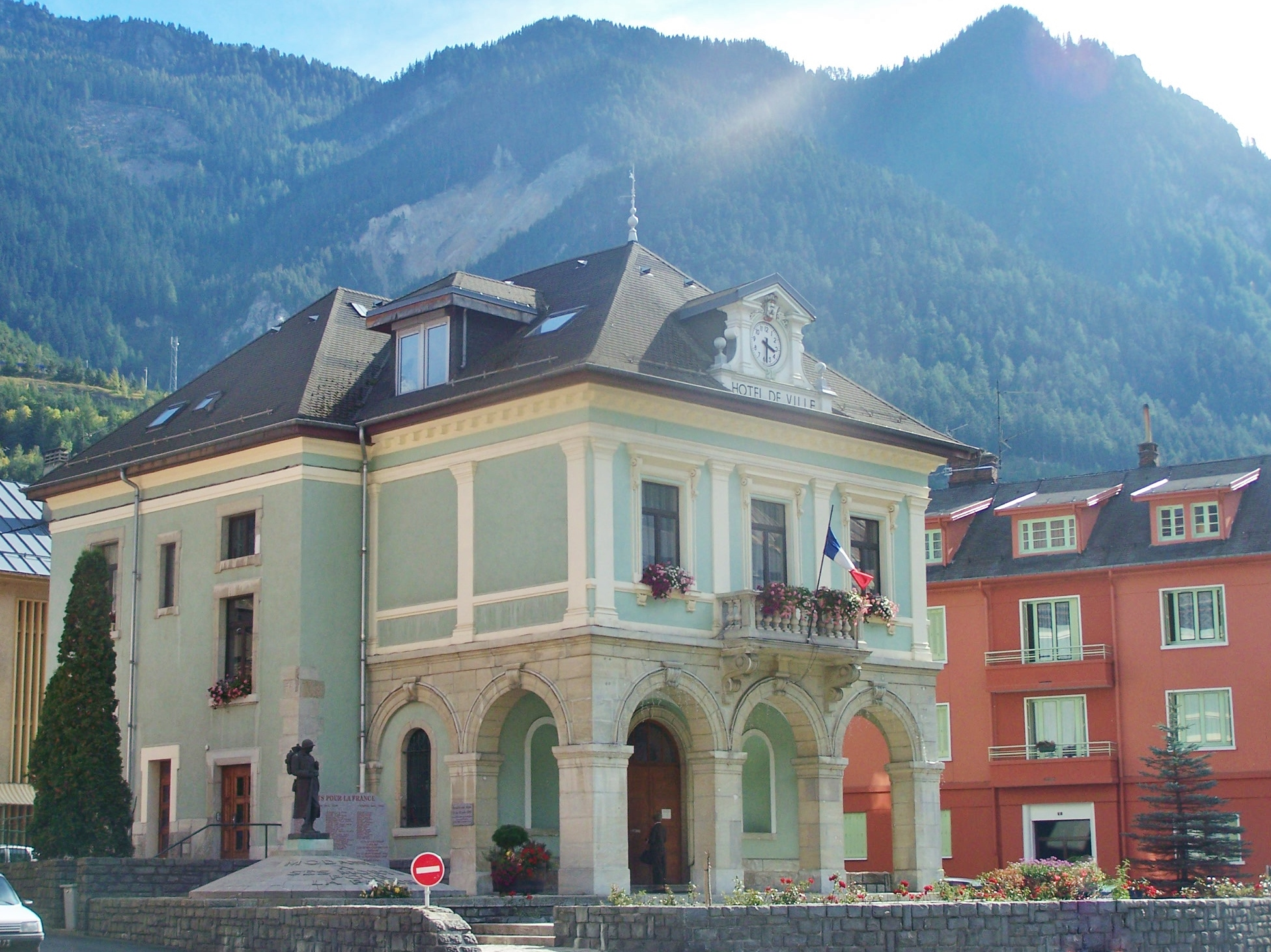
Modane town hall in 2007

2014 municipal elections in Savoie

=== List of mayors ===
List of mayors of Modane
Start	End	Name	Party	Other details
June 1995	March 2008	Claude Vallet	DVG	
March 2008	March 2014	Jean-Claude Raffin	DVG	
March 2014	In progress	Jean-Claude Raffin	DVG	

=== Twinning ===
Modane is twinned with:

- Bardonecchia, Italy since the 1980s
- Ohmden, Germany since 2000

== Population and society ==
=== Demography ===
Historical population

Year	Pop.	±% p.a.
1793	902	—
1800	948	+0.71%
1806	1,139	+3.11%
1822	1,076	−0.35%
1838	1,200	+0.68%
1848	1,217	+0.14%
1858	1,204	−0.11%
1861	1,227	+0.63%
1866	1,343	+1.82%
1872	1,599	+2.95%
1876	2,144	+7.61%
1881	2,394	+2.23%

Year	Pop.	±% p.a.
1886	2,572	+1.44%
1891	2,725	+1.16%
1896	2,771	+0.34%
1901	2,603	−1.24%
1906	2,676	+0.55%
1911	3,260	+4.03%
1921	2,958	−0.97%
1926	3,616	+4.10%
1931	4,441	+4.20%
1936	4,930	+2.11%
1946	1,654	−10.35%
1954	4,064	+11.89%

Year	Pop.	±% p.a.
1962	4,735	+1.93%
1968	5,633	+2.94%
1975	4,974	−1.76%
1982	4,798	−0.51%
1990	4,250	−1.50%
1999	3,658	−1.65%
2007	3,754	+0.32%
2012	3,345	−2.28%
2017	3,097	−1.53%
2023	2,849	−1.38%

Population without double counting from 1962 to 1999; municipal population for the dates afterwards
Source: EHESS and INSEE

=== Education ===
Daycare:

- Halte garderie "Les petits poucets"
- After-school daycare of the schools of Modane

Schools:

- Paul Bert kindergarten school
- Jules Ferry Elementary School

Collège: La Vanoise Collège

== Economy ==
=== Agriculture ===
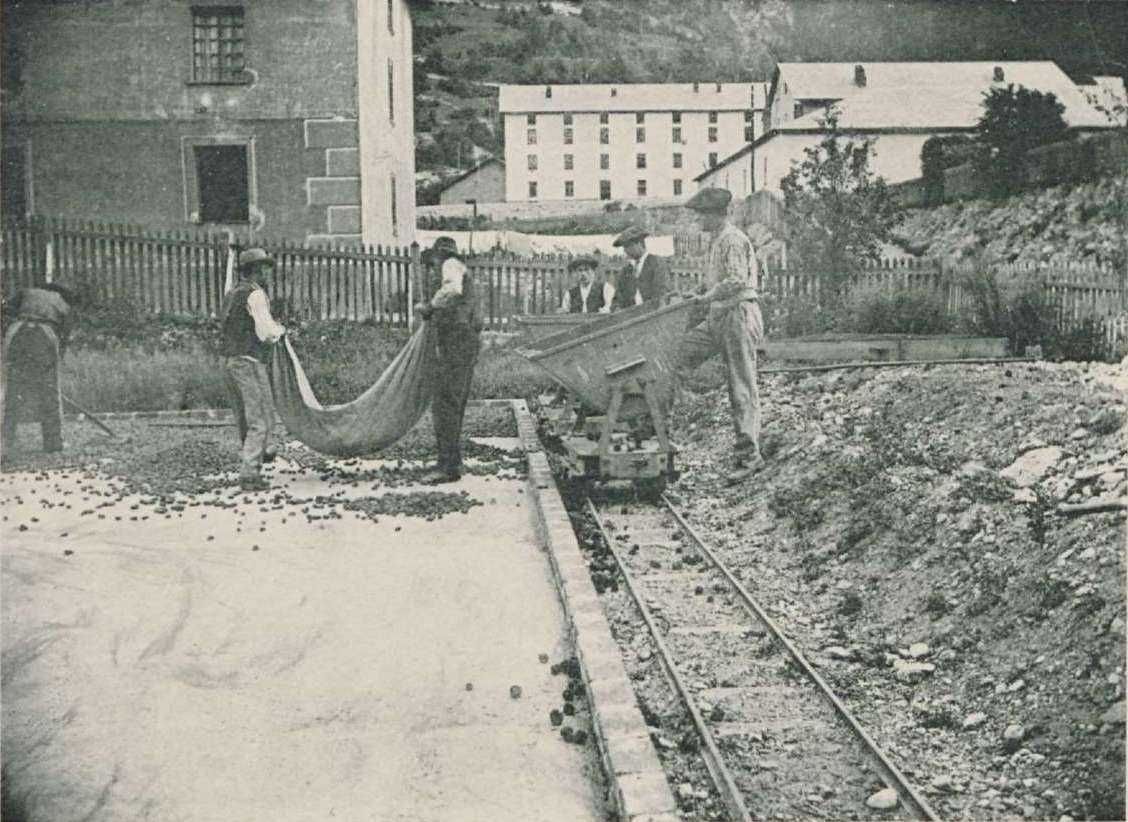
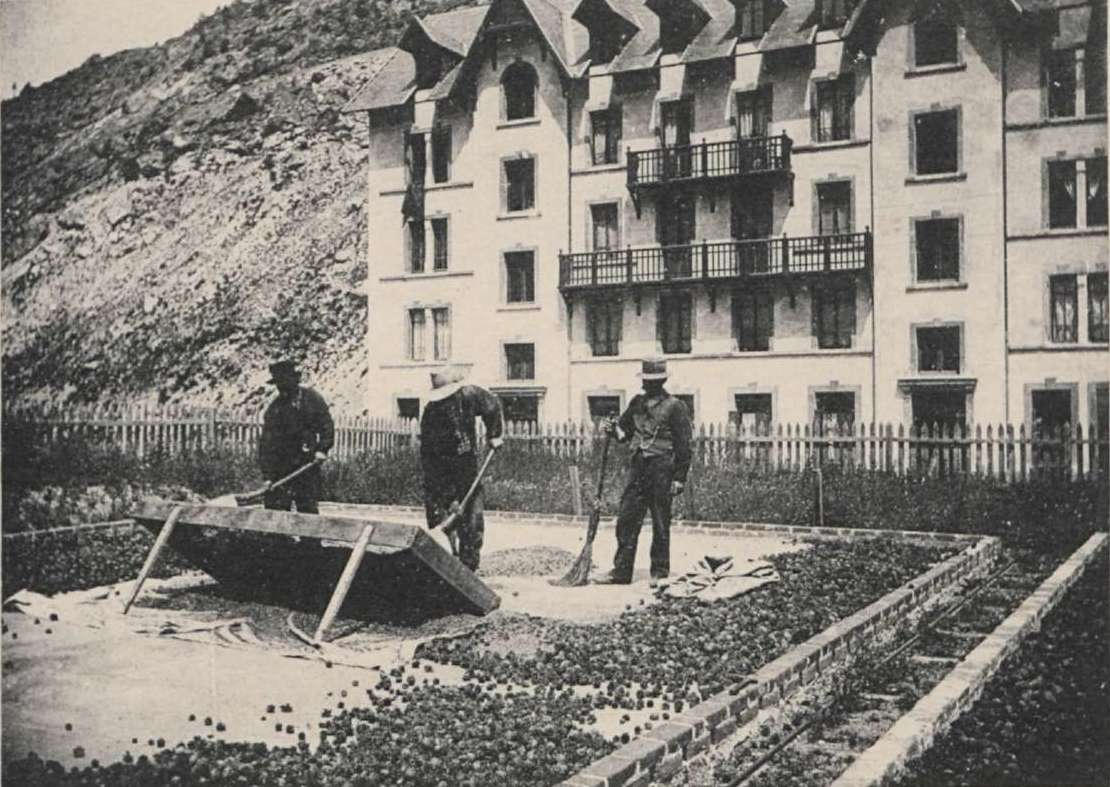
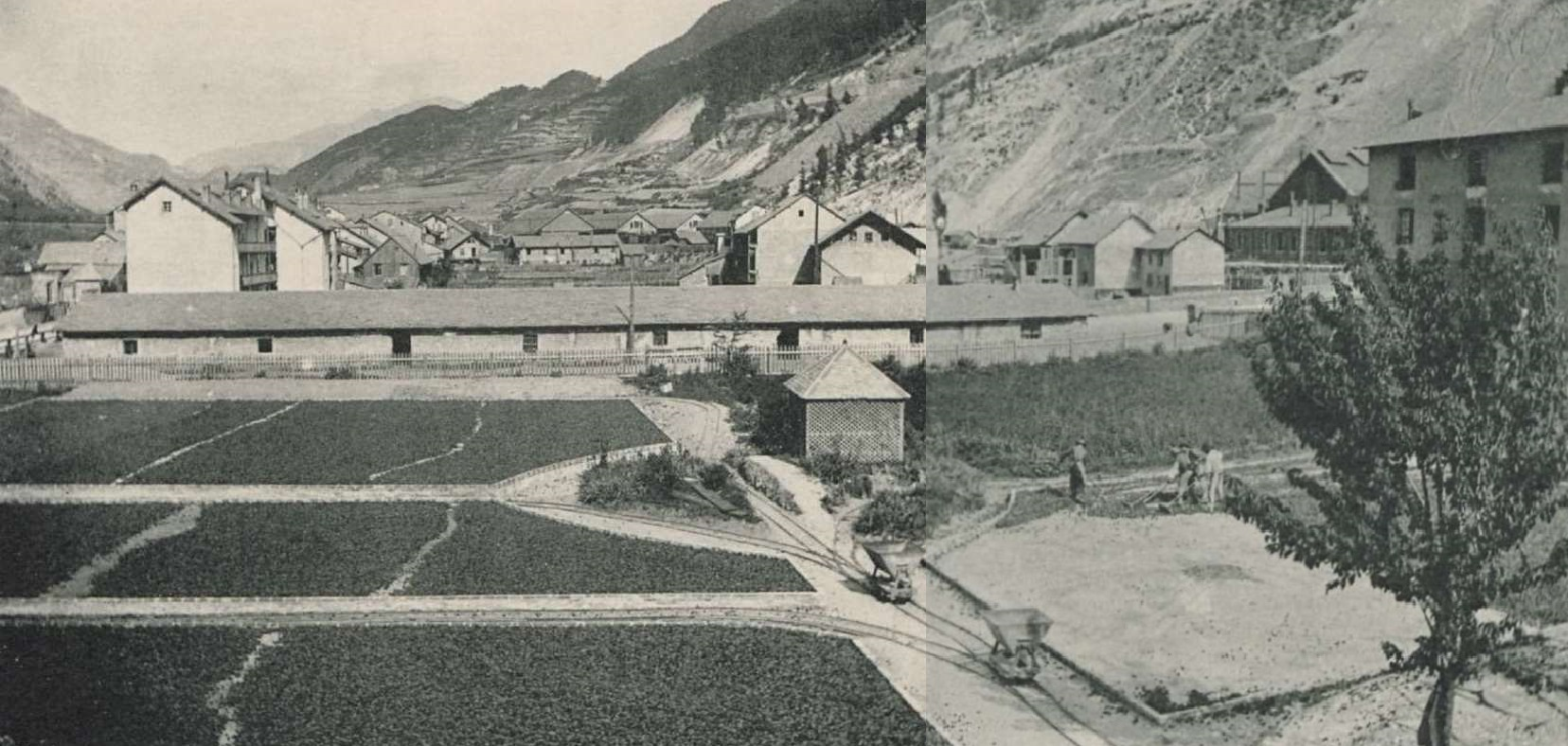
Decauville railway on the drying site for Swiss stone pine cones in Modane (Sécherie de Modane), 1892-1893

In Modane existed around 1892 a large, fortified drying place for Swiss stone pine cones, which was accessed via a Decauville narrow gauge railway. The cones and seeds were used to produce pine liqueur and food, respectively.

=== Business and shops ===
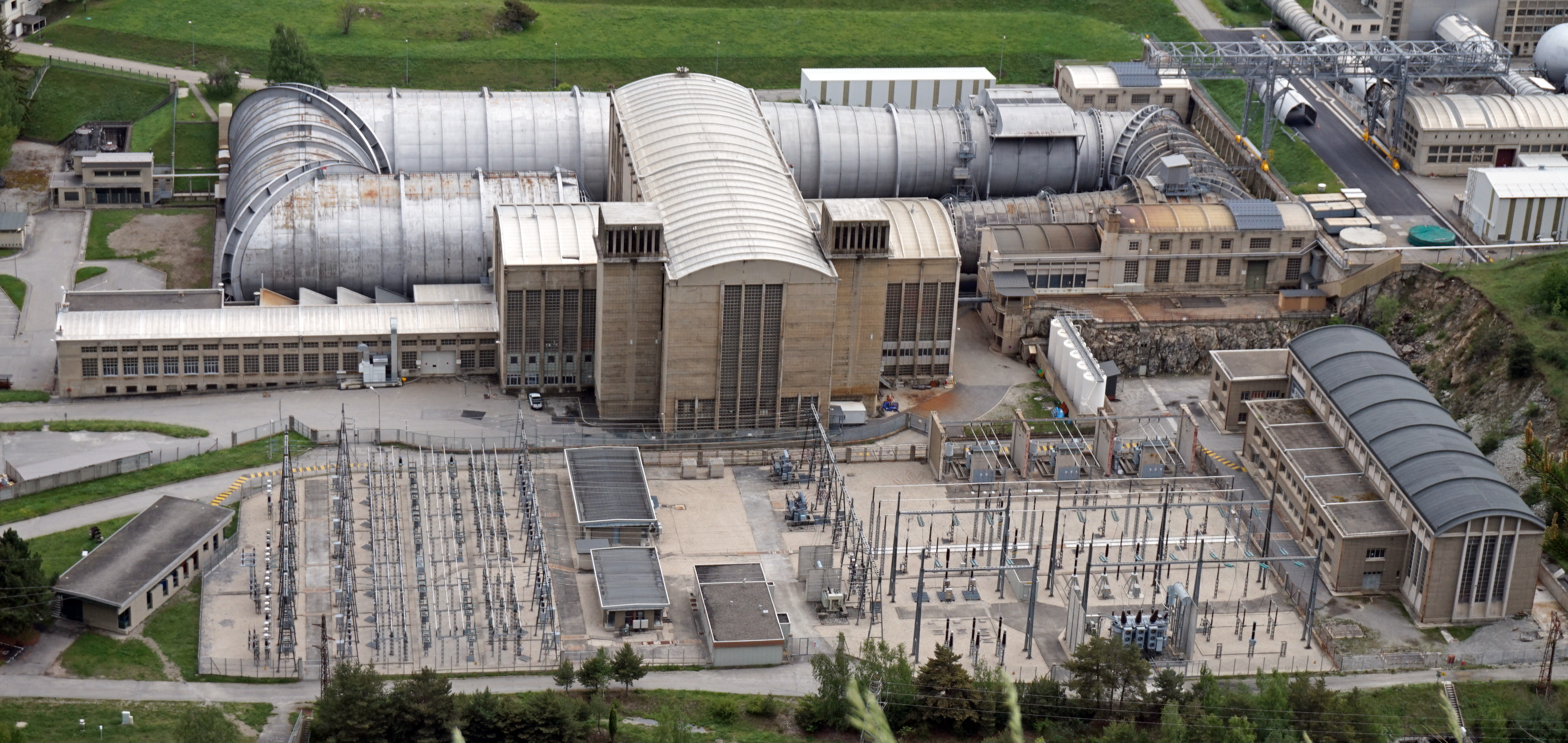
The ONERA site in the commune of Modane and Avrieux.

- The French society of the Fréjus Road Tunnel (SFTRF), whose head office is located on the platform of the tunnel in Modane, in addition to the road tunnel manages all of the Maurienne autoroute (connecting Aiton at the platform of the tunnel of Modane).
- The Modane Underground Laboratory (LSM), centre of basic research of the IN2P3 (CNRS) and the CEA, located in the middle of the Fréjus Road Tunnel
- Headquarters of the Jacquemmoz International Transport company founded in 1955. The company saw its fleet of vehicles very strongly affected by the mudslide at Saint-Antoine in 1987. It had 16 trucks and during the mudslide, it lost thirteen. The company now has five branches: Modane, Saint-Rémy-de-Maurienne, Montmélian (Chambéry), Corbas (Lyon), and Puiseaux (Montargis). The transport capacity is 233 vehicles, recent semi-trailers and trailer trucks, operated as a family business accompanied by 320 employees.
- The Albaron national training centre of the Red Cross
- SNCF border station of Modane
- Wind tunnel of Modane, ONERA, the largest in the world. This wind tunnel where many civil and military aircraft have been tested mainly employs technicians and a few researchers, actually located administratively on the commune of Avrieux (adjacent to Modane). It will be closed "if nothing is done to secure its soil", while a renewed interest for wind tunnel testing is emerging in the world, there are yet imperfect digital models.
- From 1885 to 1993, the paper mill of the Groupe Matussière & Forest harnessing the power of the Arc at the entrance of Fourneaux, provides work for many people of Modane. The Grenoble papermakers of the Matussiere family gave their name to the current namesake shopping area.

=== Tourism ===
In 2014, the capacity of the commune, estimated by the organisation of Savoie Mont Blanc, is 7,849 tourist beds in 870 establishments. (Note: Savoie Mont Blanc's structure, for this statistical data, the capacity in terms of tourist beds of a station or a commune adds merchant establishments, which belong to the hospitality sector, and non-market accommodation, which implies no commercial transaction as secondary residences.) Valfréjus ski station concentrates most of these beds and structures (over 70%). The accommodation of the commune is as follows: 139 furnished; 8 apartment hotels; 5 hotels; an outdoors facility; one holiday village and one gîte or overnight gîte.

=== Transport ===
The nearest airports are Turin Airport, located 119 km (74 mi) east, Alpes–Isère Airport, located 184 km (114 mi) west, and Geneva Airport, located 192 km (119 mi) north west of Modane.

== Sport ==
The Tour de France cycling race came to Modane, starting stage 19 there, in 2011. Modane is due to welcome the return of the race during the 2015 Tour de France, for the start of stage 20, the penultimate stage, on 25 July.

== Local culture and heritage ==
=== Places and monuments ===
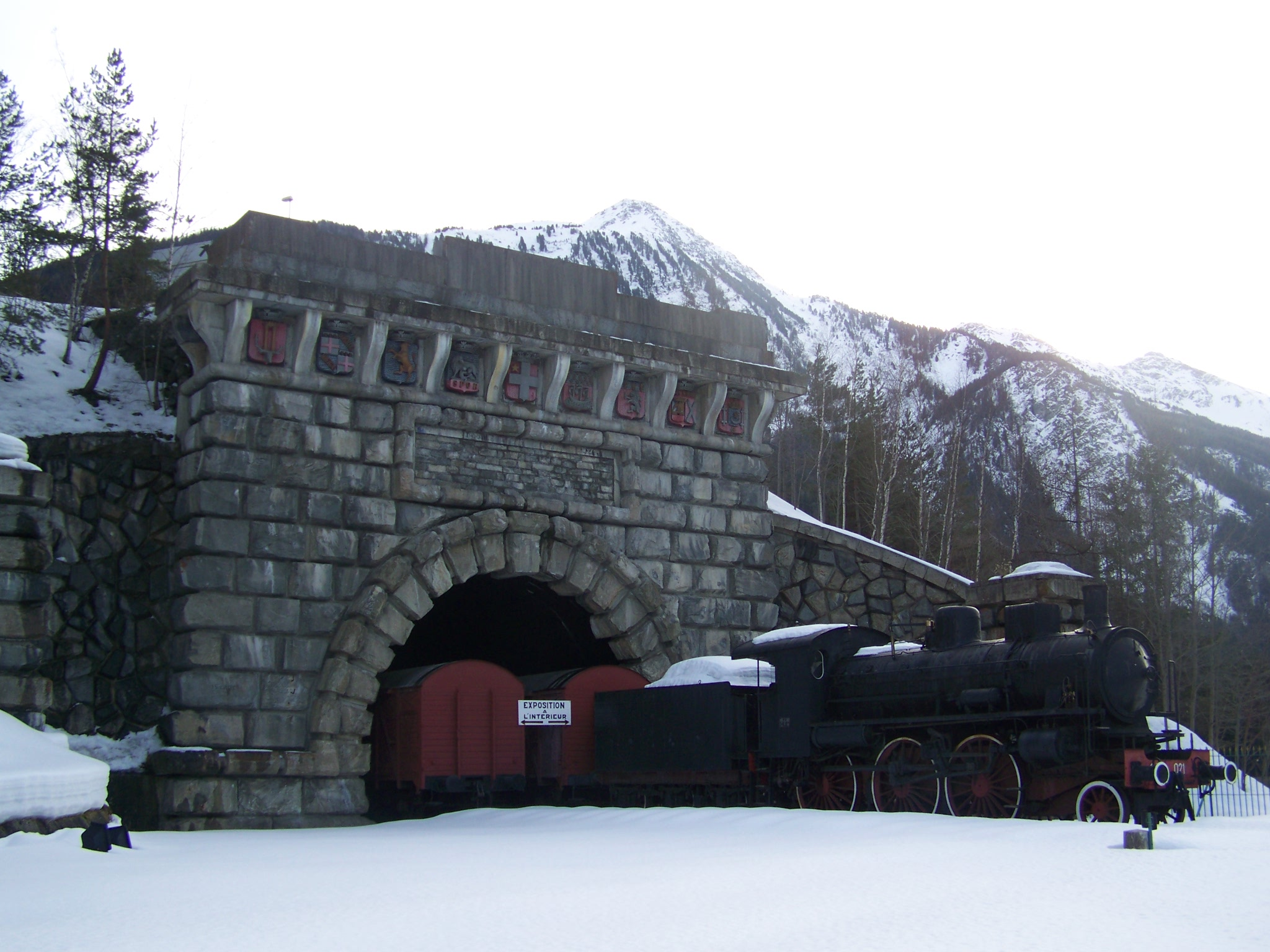
Former entrance to the Fréjus Rail Tunnel

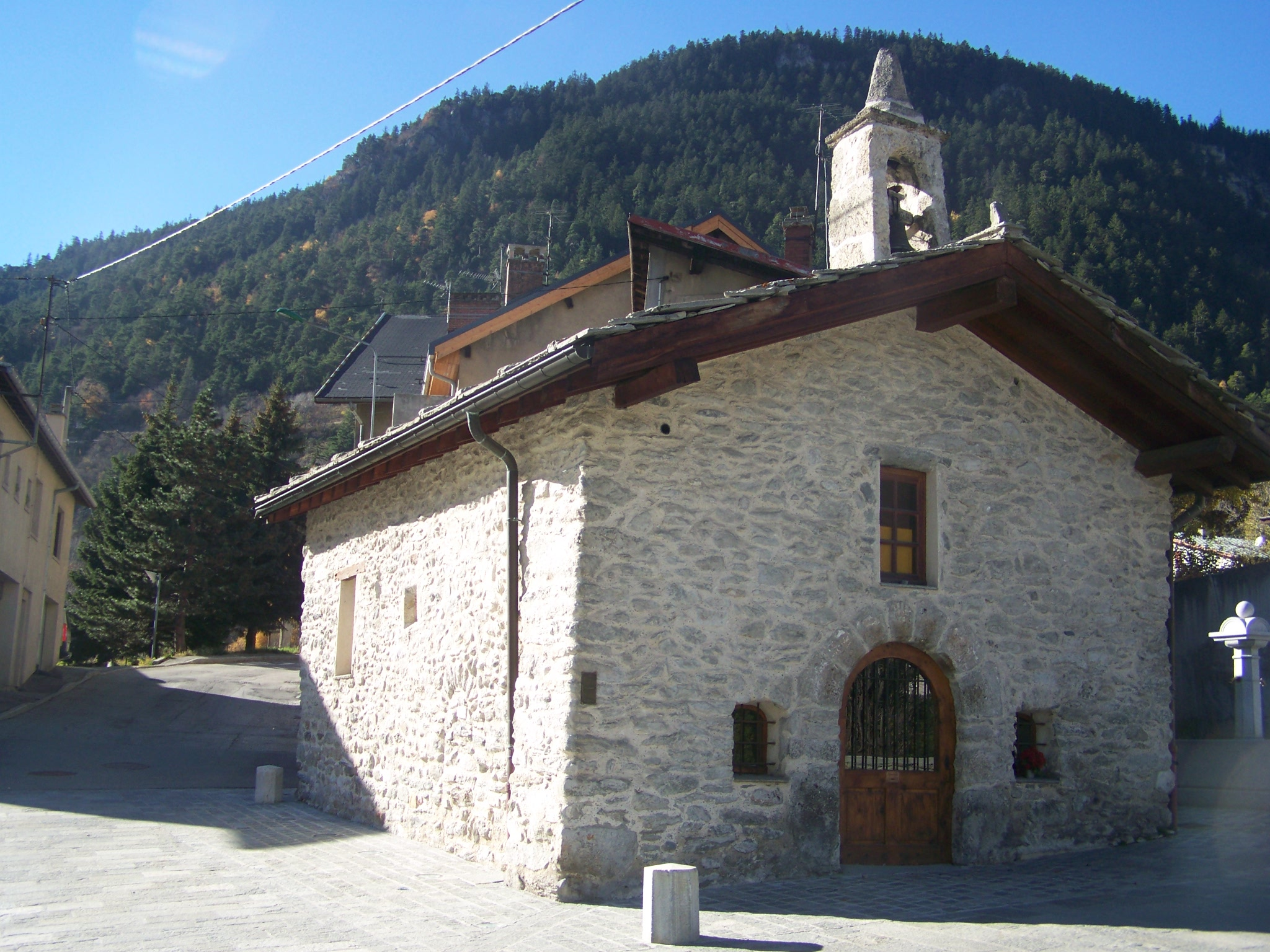
The chapel of Saint-Jacques

- The fountain in front of the town hall (Place de la Mairie) is listed as an historical monument. It dates from 1572.
- The leaning house: The leaning house is located on the road of Modane to Valfréjus. Formerly known as la poudrière [the powder magazine], it was used to shelter a stock of powder intended to destroy the tunnel in the event of war. The house was made of dry stone. In 1939, it was overcome by the construction of a concrete blockhouse. In 1944 the Germans dynamited the railway tunnel and the dry stone house collapsed. The blockhouse flew 30 metres (98 ft) and on falling, sank into the ground while remaining intact. When one enters one easily loses balance, because it is tilted at two angles. It is the most visited monument of the Savoie (free visit). The leaning house is part of the Association of the Saint-Gobain Fort Museum. It belongs to the army, SNCF and the commune of Modane.
- The Fort du Replaton was built to defend the entrance of the railway tunnel at the end of the 19th century. This Séré de Rivières-type fort cannot be visited. The walk departing from Loutraz (30 min) is worthwhile as one can see the illuminations of the fort at night.
- The monumental entrance of the Fréjus Rail Tunnel was built during the first breakthrough of the Alps between 1857 and 1871. This former entrance of the Fréjus rail tunnel is situated on the road linking Modane to Valfréjus.
- The Saint-Jacques Chapel: A unique baroque building of the town, this small Romanesque chapel, in its construction, has been completely restored. Visits are on request from the association for the restoration of the chapel.
- The parish church: A testimony of reconstruction, it is due to the architect and also author of the best-known church of the Plateau d'Assy. Only the bell tower of this building pre-dates World War II, the rest having been destroyed during bombings.
- The Fort of Saint-Gobain: A structure of the Maginot Line built in 1933 to protect the national road and railway.
- Modane internment camp: 539th group of foreign workers in 1940.

=== Museums ===
- The Museobar: Through four reconstructions of cafes from different eras ranging from 1880 to 1935, the Museobar traces and brings to life the history of Modane and Fourneaux. Trompe-l'œil, music of pianolas, testimonies and especially images are illustrations of this extraordinary story.
- The Rizerie des Alpes, a rice mill, an historical monument and labelled as Heritage of the 20th century: It was the function of this "Greek temple" in the middle of the city on the edge of the Arc. To view in passing, this building is included in the supplementary inventory of historical monuments. Now converted into an exhibition centre for the future Lyon-Turin link.
- Carré Sciences: An interactive space of 120 square metres (1,300 sq ft) dedicated to scientific culture, with the emanation to the general public of the Modane Underground Laboratory of the CNRS.

=== Personalities linked to the commune ===
- Adrien Badin (1873-1917), engineer and leader of the aluminium conglomerate Pechiney during the years before World War I
- Aurel Ramat, typographer, and grammairen, born in 1926 in Modane
- Fabrice Melquiot, playwright, born in Modane in 1972.

=== Heraldry ===
Arms of Modane	The arms of Modane are blazoned : Gules two bars of or raised in pale, to a cross drilled and lowered argent, the cross stitched on the bars, surmounted by a Fleur-de-lis or; and to a tower crenellated five pieces of the same, open of sable and stitched on the cross.

== See also ==
- Communes of the Savoie department
- Fréjus Road Tunnel
- Fréjus Rail Tunnel
- Turin–Lyon high-speed railway

== Bibliography ==
- Bourgoin, Virginie (2008). Découvrir le patrimoine naturel de Modane [Discover the natural heritage of Modane]. Découvrir le patrimoine naturel de... (in French). Chambéry: Parc national de la Vanoise. ISBN 978-2-901617-26-6.
