= La Norma =

Ski resort in Villarodin-Bourget, France

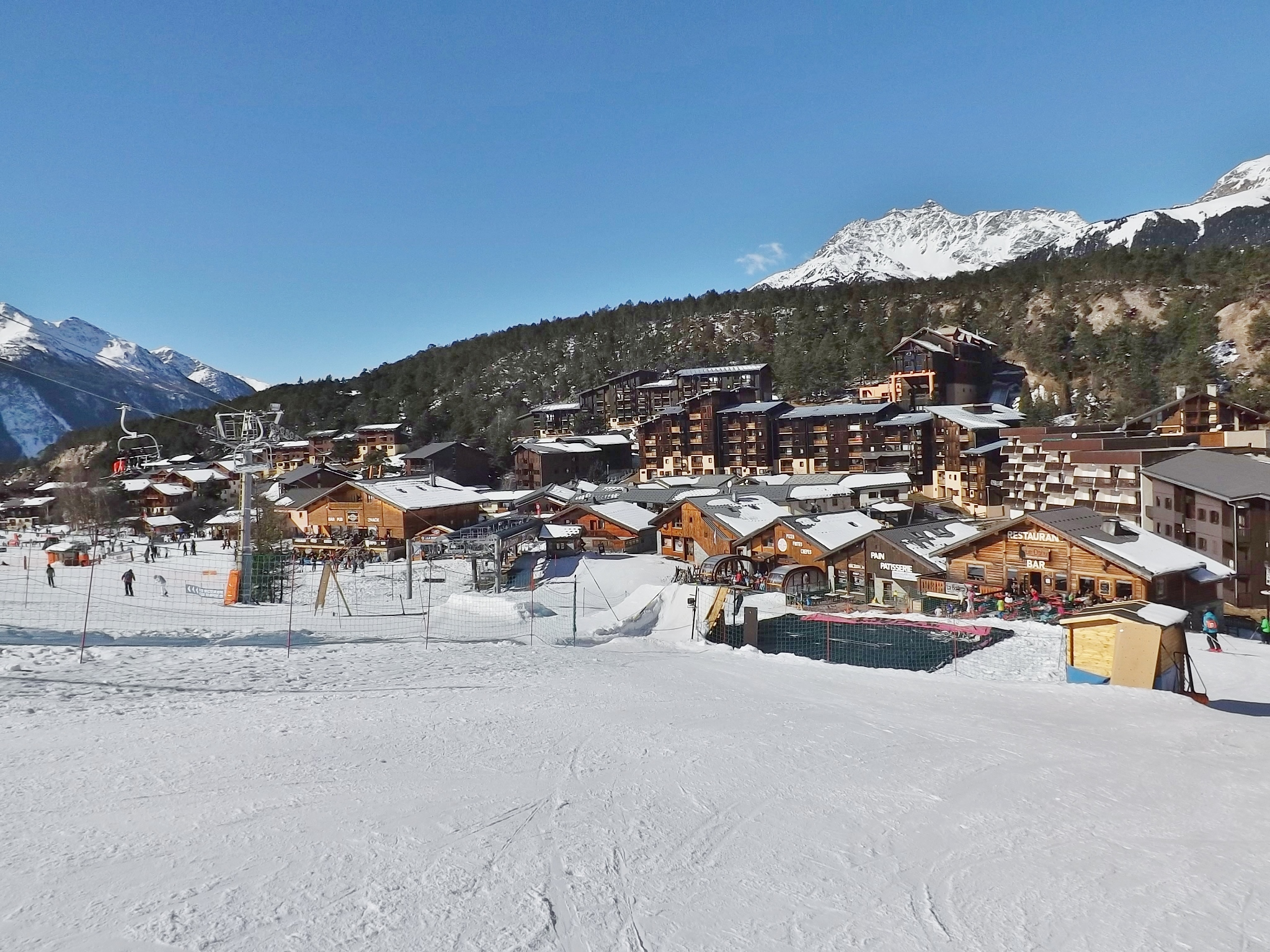

- Location within Alps
- Nearest city: Chambéry
- Coordinates: 45°12′08″N 6°41′56″E
- Top elevation: 2,726 m (8,944 ft)
- Base elevation: 1,358 m (4,455 ft)
- Skiable area: 65 km of runs
- Trails: 27; 7 beginner 7 easy 11 intermediate 2 difficult
- Website: Website

La Norma is a ski resort in the Maurienne Valley, located in the commune of Villarodin-Bourget, in the Savoie department in the Auvergne-Rhône-Alpes region of France.

The station was opened in 1971.
