= Valfréjus =

Ski resort in the Maurienne Valley, France

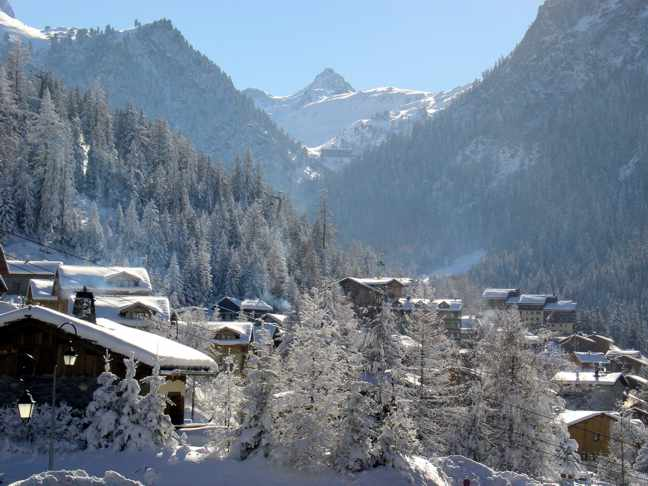

- Location within Alps
- Nearest city: Chambéry
- Coordinates: 45°10′26″N 6°39′12″E
- Top elevation: 2,737 m (8,980 ft)
- Base elevation: 1,550 m (5,090 ft)
- Skiable area: 83 km of runs
- Trails: 29; 4 beginner 10 easy 11 intermediate 4 difficult
- Website: Website

Valfréjus is a ski resort in the Maurienne Valley, located in the commune of Modane, in the Savoie department in the Auvergne-Rhône-Alpes region.

The station was opened in 1983.
