= Ouvrage Sapey =

Work of Maginot Line's Alpine extension

- Part of Maginot Line, Alpine Line, Séré de Rivières system
- Southeast France
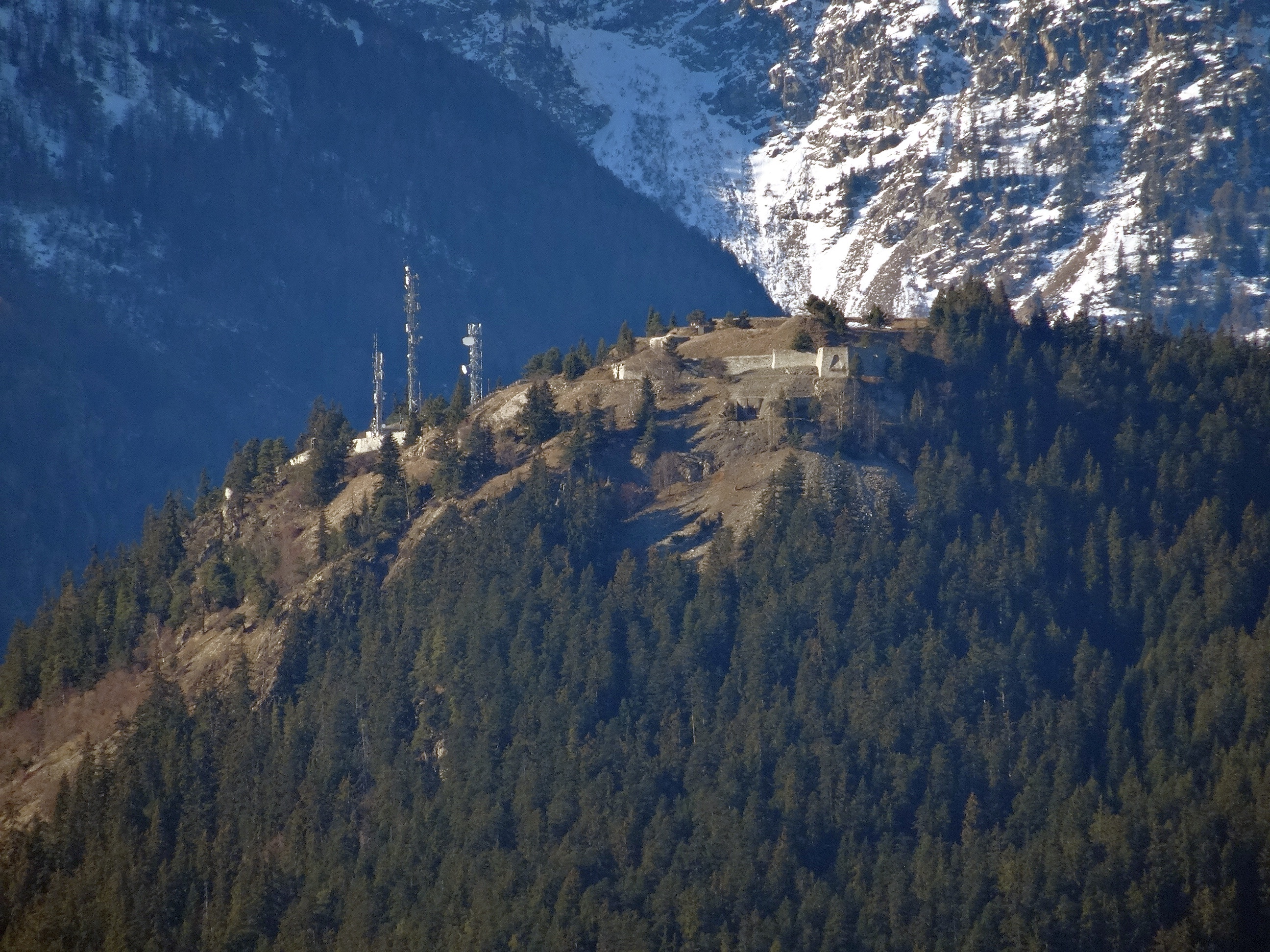

Site information
- Controlled by: France

Location
- Coordinates: 45.20307°N 6.64967°E

Site history
- Built: 1931
- Built by: CORF
- In use: Abandoned
- Materials: Concrete, steel, rock excavation
- Battles/wars: Battle of France

Ouvrage Sapey is a work (gros ouvrage) of the Maginot Line's Alpine extension, the Alpine Line, also known as the Little Maginot Line. The ouvrage consists of one entry block, three artillery blocks and one observation block two kilometers west of Modane. The ouvrage was built beneath the older Fort du Sapey. The new work cost 12.8 million francs.

The ouvrage and fort were accessed by an aerial tram built in 1908, which also connected to Fort du Replaton, located down the slope from Sapey.

== Fort du Sapey ==
The Fort du Sapey is the center of an ensemble of fortifications designed to protect Modane, the valley of the Arc and the terminus of the Fréjus Rail Tunnel to Italy, which was completed in 1871. The fort was built 1,600 metres (5,200 ft) to the west of Modane at an altitude of about 1,700 metres (5,600 ft), on a hill that dominates the entire valley. The principal fort was built between 1884 and 1892 as part of the Séré de Rivières system. Construction was initially of stone, but concrete was added after the invention of high explosive made masonry construction untenable in fortifications. Additional work was undertaken in 1913, continuing until work stopped in 1916. The work reinforced magazines, batteries and shelters and excavated galleries for further shelters into the rock. A special battery was built and excavated into the rock to directly cover the end of the Fréjus tunnel. The entire ensemble was surrounded by a wall.

The position received a disproportionate amount of resources, considering the limited possibilities for enemy attack through the tunnel or over the Mont Cenis pass.

=== Batterie du Sapey ===
The battery covering the end of the rail tunnel was completed between 1913 and 1916, mounting six 155mm guns. It was renovated in the 1930s, but unaltered. The position remained military property into the 2000s, and is presently abandoned. It is owned by the commune of Modane. Access is forbidden.

=== Sapey barracks ===
The barracks were built in 1898 and partly modernized between 1913 and 1916. The barracks were provided with a large underground shelter or abri-caverne capable of housing 500. A number of access galleries exist and connect to the later Maginot ouvrages. The barracks are community property.

=== Redoute du Sapey ===
The principal redoubt of Sapey was built between 1885 and 1892. Manned by 36 soldiers under 4 officers, it mounted ten de Bange 120 mm guns, six in the main fortification and four in an annex. The redoubt was provided with a drawbridge and impressive walls. The casemates were cut from rock and accessed by underground galleries. Renovations in the 1930s provided concrete reinforcement. The redoubt was kept as military property until the 21st century, but has suffered considerable deterioration. It is now community property and may not be accessed.

== Ouvrage du Sapey ==
The Maginot ouvrage extended under the barracks and redoubt of Fort Sapey. Entered from the west, the galleries connected to the old abris of the barracks, emerging at combat blocks under the walls for the redoubt on the east side. The proposed 145mm turret was to be built in the area of the barracks, near the underground utility plant.

=== Description ===
- Block 1 (artillery): one observation launcher cloche, and machine gun cloche, four 75 mm gun embrasures (also known as crenellations) and one heavy twin machine gun/47mm anti-tank gun embrasure.
- Block 2 (artillery): one 75mm gun embrasure (Battery Maurienne).
- Block 3 (observation): one observation cloche and two observation embrasures.
- Block 4 (artillery): two 75mm gun embrasures (Battery Fréjus).
- Entry block: one machine gun cloche and one machine gun/47mm anti-tank gun embrasure.

A 145mm gun turret was planned but never installed.

== History ==
The 75mm guns of Sapey Fréjus battery fired on Italian troops in the vicinity La Roue on 20 June 1940. The next day the battery fired on the Vallée-Étroite. Fréjus was joined by Battery Maurienne on the 22nd, firing on Italian forces in the vicinity of Bramans. The next day the ouvrage fired toward Planey. Further bombardments followed on the 24th and 25th, ceasing with the armistice of the 25th. Fire direction as provided by Ouvrage Saint-Antoine. A total of 1428 shots were fired by Maurienne and 981 by Fréjus.

After the 1940 armistice, Italian forces occupied the Alpine ouvrages and disarmed them. In August 1943, southern France was occupied by the German 19th Army, which took over many of the Alpine positions that had been occupied by the Italians until Italy's withdrawal from the war in September 1943.

In 1944, Sapey was recaptured relatively easily on 13 September. Sapey had suffered little damage during the war, apart from the destruction of its aerial tram, and by the end of 1944 was partly repaired and placed into service. Immediately after the war, the Maurienne region was regarded as an area of medium priority for restoration and reuse by the military. By the 1950s the positions in the Southeast of France were restored and operational again. However, by 1960, with France's acquisition of nuclear weapons, the cost and effectiveness of the Maginot system was called into question. Between 1964 and 1971 nearly all of the Maginot fortifications were deactivated.

== See also ==
- List of Alpine Line ouvrages

== Bibliography ==
- Allcorn, William. The Maginot Line 1928–45. Oxford: Osprey Publishing, 2003. ISBN 1-84176-646-1
- Kaufmann, J.E. and Kaufmann, H.W. Fortress France: The Maginot Line and French Defenses in World War II, Stackpole Books, 2006. ISBN 0-275-98345-5
- Kaufmann, J.E., Kaufmann, H.W., Jancovič-Potočnik, A. and Lang, P. The Maginot Line: History and Guide, Pen and Sword, 2011. ISBN 978-1-84884-068-3
- Mary, Jean-Yves; Hohnadel, Alain; Sicard, Jacques. Hommes et Ouvrages de la Ligne Maginot, Tome 1. Paris, Histoire & Collections, 2001. ISBN 2-908182-88-2 (in French)
- Mary, Jean-Yves; Hohnadel, Alain; Sicard, Jacques. Hommes et Ouvrages de la Ligne Maginot, Tome 4 – La fortification alpine. Paris, Histoire & Collections, 2009. ISBN 978-2-915239-46-1 (in French)
- Mary, Jean-Yves; Hohnadel, Alain; Sicard, Jacques. Hommes et Ouvrages de la Ligne Maginot, Tome 5. Paris, Histoire & Collections, 2009. ISBN 978-2-35250-127-5 (in French)
