= Fréjus Rail Tunnel =

Railway tunnel through the Alps

Coordinates: 45°08′27″N 6°41′20″E

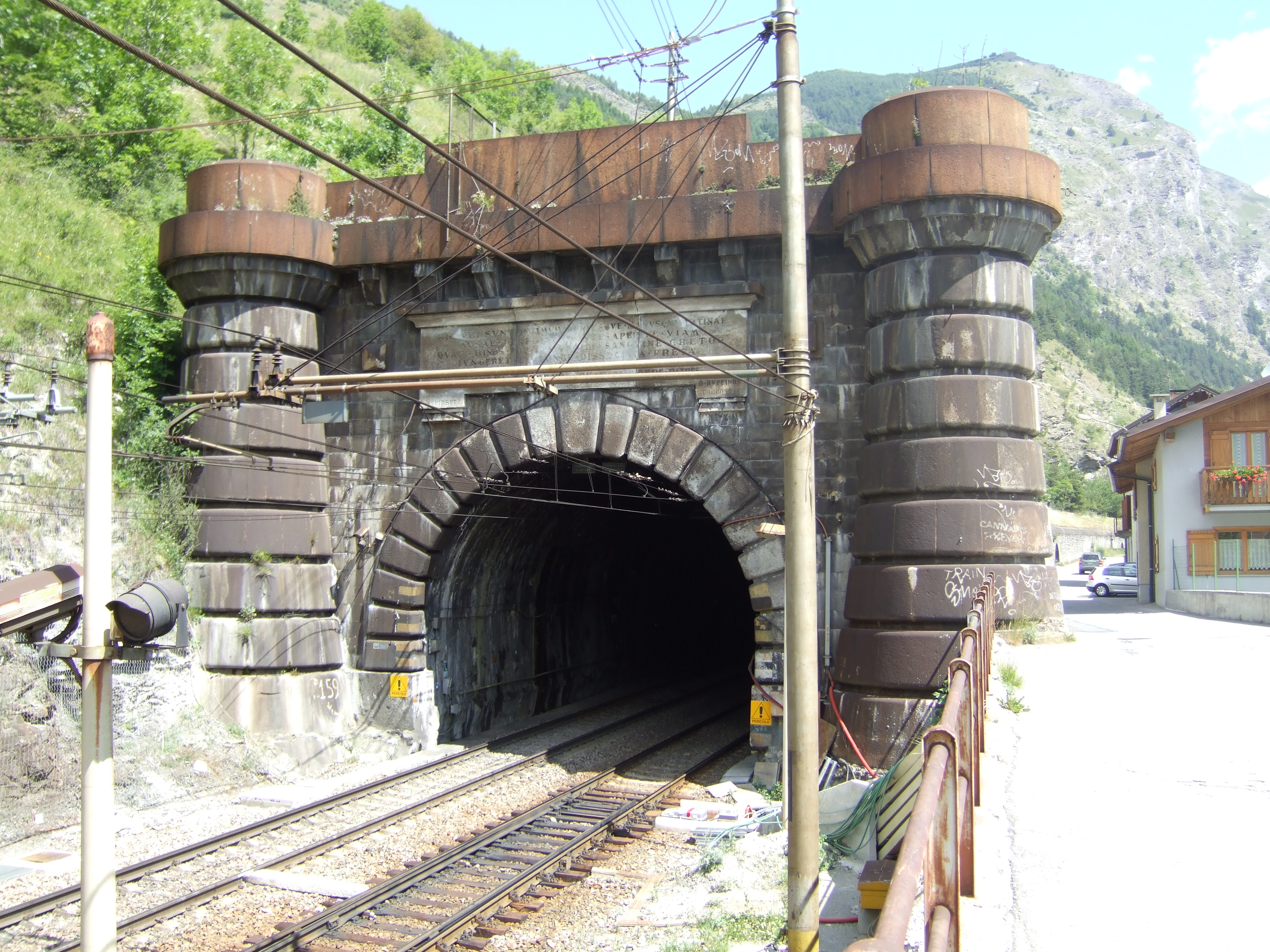
- The Italian Portal of the Fréjus Rail Tunnel
- Interactive map of Fréjus Rail Tunnel

Overview
- Location: Mont Cenis
- Start: Bardonecchia, Italy
- End: Modane, France

Operation
- Opened: 17 September 1871
- Traffic: Railway
- Character: Passenger and freight

Technical
- Line length: 13.7 km (8.5 mi)
- No. of tracks: Two
- Track gauge: 1,435 mm (4 ft 8 1/2 in)
- Electrified: 3 kV DC

The Fréjus Rail Tunnel (also called Mont Cenis Tunnel) is a rail tunnel of 13.7 km (8.5 mi) length in the European Alps, carrying the Turin–Modane railway through Mont Cenis to an end-on connection with the Culoz–Modane railway and linking Bardonecchia in Italy to Modane in France. Its mean altitude is 1,123 metres (3,684 ft) and it passes beneath the Pointe du Fréjus (2,932 metres (9,619 ft)) and the Col du Fréjus (2,542 metres (8,340 ft)).

Headed by the Savoyard civil engineer Germain Sommeiller, construction of the tunnel commenced during August 1857, at a time when both ends of the future tunnel were in the Kingdom of Sardinia. From the onset, the tunnel was an ambitious engineering challenge, its gallery being twice the length of any tunnel previously constructed. Some figures believed that it would take as many as 40 years to complete; the total construction time was 13 years, the work having been greatly accelerated by the introduction of new technologies such as pneumatic drilling machines and dynamite. On 17 September 1871, the Fréjus Tunnel was opened to traffic for the first time, facilitating a new era of interaction between France and Italy.

The Fréjus tunnel remains an important link in the connection between Rome and Paris, via Turin and Chambéry. Following the development of car and truck transportation, the Fréjus Road Tunnel was built along the same path from 1974 to 1980. During the 2000s, the Fréjus Rail Tunnel underwent a series of works to modernise and improve it, including the increase of its bore to accommodate wider rail vehicles, such as container trucks on piggy-back wagons, as part of the Autoroute Ferroviaire Alpine. A future high-speed rail tunnel to improve transit capacity between France and Italy, called the Mont d'Ambin Base Tunnel, is being planned as part of the Turin–Lyon high-speed railway project.

== History ==
=== Background ===
The mountains of the Alps had posed long difficulties to any movements between Italy and its neighbours. Even with the arrival of new technologies such as the railway, the task of successfully traversing these peaks was viewed by numerous figures as a fool's errand, unfeasible to the point of being impossible. However, there was a strong political desire amongst officials in both Italy and France to establish a railway between the two which, if completed, would launch a new era of transit and bring new commercial opportunities for both nations. In Italy, the Victor Emmanuel Railway, which included both the Culoz–Modane railway across Savoy and the Turin–Modane railway across Piedmont, was largely constructed in the 1850s by the Kingdom of Sardinia and named after its king, Victor Emmanuel II. Prior to 1860, Sardinia had included both Savoy and Piedmont.

Even as it was being first envisioned, the Fréjus Tunnel, a necessary feature for traversing Mont Cenis, was viewed as being the primary engineering challenge of the Turin–Modane railway by far; the initial length of its gallery was 12.8 kilometres (8.0 mi), which was twice as long as the longest tunnel in the world at that time. The Savoyard civil engineer Germain Sommeiller was appointed to head this undertaking. Considerable backing for the endeavor was forthcoming from individual Italians, not only in terms of funding, but also technical expertise, public endorsements, and labourers.

=== Construction ===
During August 1857, drilling work commenced on the Bardonecchia side; activity started on the Modane side in December 1857. It had been deemed impossible to increase the rate of excavation via intermediate shafts, thus the tunnel was driven entirely from either end. Serious challenges were encountered, including difficulty with providing sufficient ventilation. New methods of ventilation were successfully introduced, alongside other technological innovations. At the time, it was believed that, if the tunnel's construction had to rely upon traditional methods alone, it would have taken 71 years to complete. Three years following the start of the tunnel's construction, unanticipated political interactions led to the transfer of Savoy from Sardinia to France in 1860 under the Treaty of Turin; the change of borders did not majorly disrupt the rate of work on the tunnel however. The tunnel took 14 years to construct, its rate of progress having been considerably increased via the use of new technical innovations such as pneumatic drilling machines powered by compressed air.

Ten drills were mounted in a frame to bore shot holes to receive blasting powder charges, with those in outermost positions aligned in a slight divergence from the centreline to increase the effective width. Air at a pressure of 7 atm (710 kPa) was conducted in iron pipes from hydraulic compressors, powered by local streams at the mouths of the workings. There were separate pipes for water jets to remove waste from the holes. Each firing required up to eighty holes, taking between six and eight hours to drill. On 26 December 1870, French and Italian workers shook hands as the two teams met halfway: the galleries were aligned to about 40 centimetres (16 in) horizontally and 60 centimetres (24 in) vertically.

On 17 September 1871, the Fréjus Tunnel was officially opened to traffic. One foreign newspaper covering the occasion, the Michigan Argus, described the tunnel as being "one of the greatest, if not the greatest, engineering feat of the age". While further major tunnels through the Alps have since been constructed, it has remained active, the Fréjus Rail Tunnel being the oldest of the large tunnels through the Alps.

Between 1868 and 1871, the Mont Cenis Pass Railway was briefly operational as a temporary link over the Mont Cenis Pass. It was closed shortly after the opening of the Fréjus Railway. This railway was itself described as an engineering achievement in its own right.

=== Alterations and improvements ===
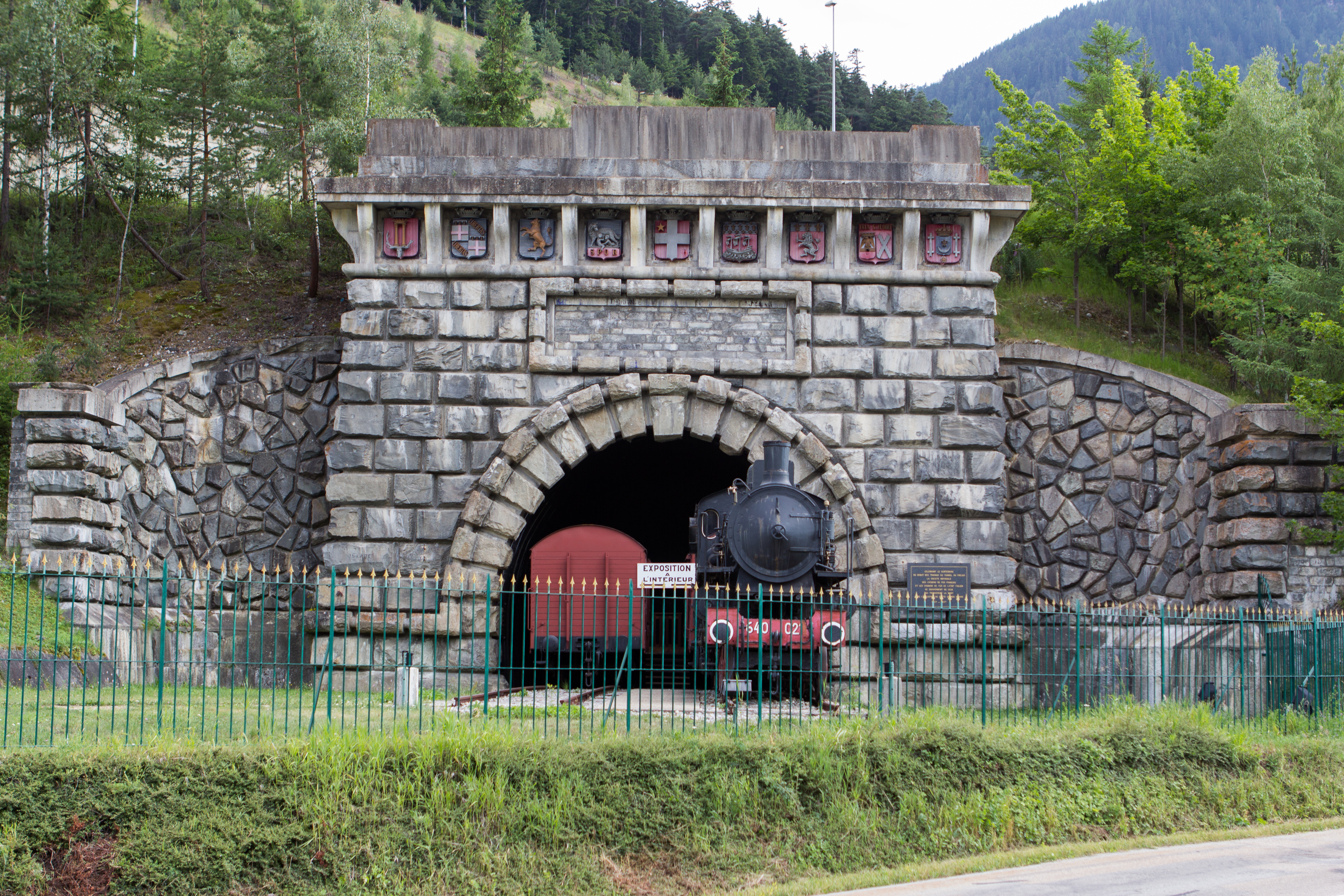
The original portal on the French side of the tunnel

The original tunnel portal on the French side at Modane was only used for little over a decade before falling into disuse after having been bypassed during 1881. It was decided to redirect the tunnel to a new entrance positioned to the east of the original, where the ground was considerably more stable. The surplus portal was left in place as a monument, and has since become a minor tourist attraction. A steam locomotive has been placed in the disused portal, which is presently located adjacent to a road.

During the 2000s, the Fréjus Rail Tunnel underwent a programme of works to both modernise and improve it. One specific and major alteration performed during this period was the enlargement of the bore to facilitate an equivalent loading gauge of French Lignes à grande vitesses (LGVs) throughout, thus enabling the tunnel to be traversed by wider rail vehicles, including container trucks on piggy-back wagons, as part of the Autoroute Ferroviaire Alpine. Various other enhancements were enacted, largely on the French side of the tunnel. The first package of work focused on civil works, while a follow-up package focused on electrical systems. During the former, the track was replaced and the track bed lowered, sections of masonry were repaired where applicable, new safety recesses created, along with other civil works around the tunnel's exterior, including a reservoir.

=== Closure ===
On 27 August 2023, a major landslide occurred on the line close to the tunnel at Saint-André à La Praz. All traffic through the tunnel, including the major TGV and Frecciarossa services between the Gare de Lyon and Milan Centrale / Porta Garibaldi were suspended. Repairs were complicated and the line remained closed until spring 2025.

== Neighbouring fortifications ==
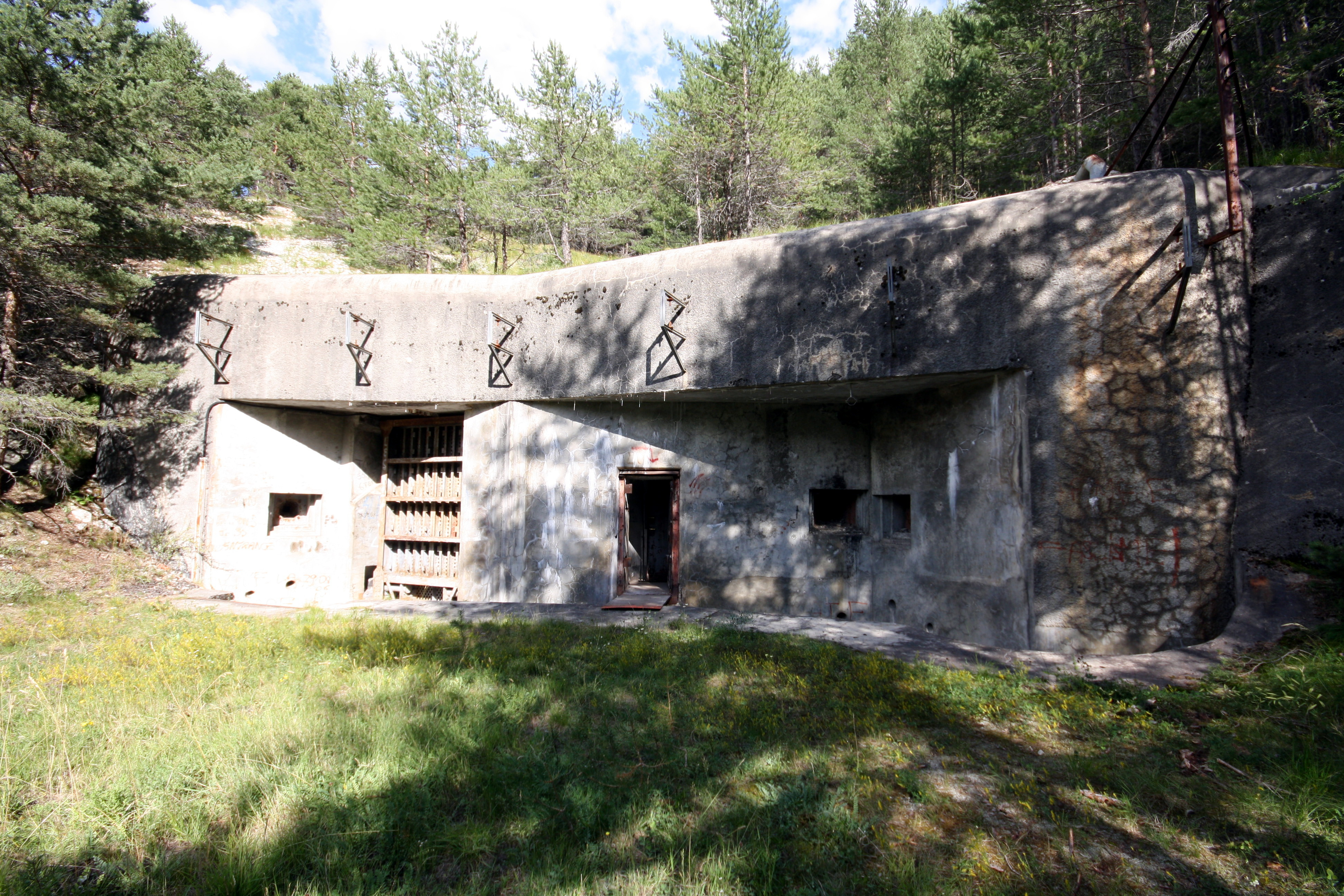
Ouvrage Saint-Antoine, overlooking the Fréjus Tunnel portal on the French side

Following the transfer of Savoy from Italy to France, the Fréjus Tunnel became a possible invasion route from Italy to France, particularly as it avoided the historical difficulties posed by the Mont Cenis pass. Accordingly, an extraordinary amount of defensive fortifications were constructed near to and around Modane. The Fort du Replaton and the Fort du Sapey were built in the late nineteenth century on the heights across the valley of the Arc. During the 1930s, the Alpine Line fortifications Ouvrage Saint-Gobain, Ouvrage Saint-Antoine and additional fortifications at Le Sappey were also constructed.

A blockhouse along the rail line to the east of the modern tunnel entrance has become a tourist attraction. The maison penchée ("leaning house") was built in 1939 to guard the tunnel entrance over an ammunition magazine connected to the tunnel by a gallery. During 1944, the retreating Germans deliberately exploded two rail wagons inside the tunnel entrance, causing the magazine to explode and blasting the blockhouse off its foundations, leaving it on a tilt.

== See also ==
- Hoosac Tunnel
- List of long tunnels by type

Records
Preceded by Standedge Tunnel	Longest tunnel 1871–1882	Succeeded by Gotthard Rail Tunnel
