= Dôme de Polset =

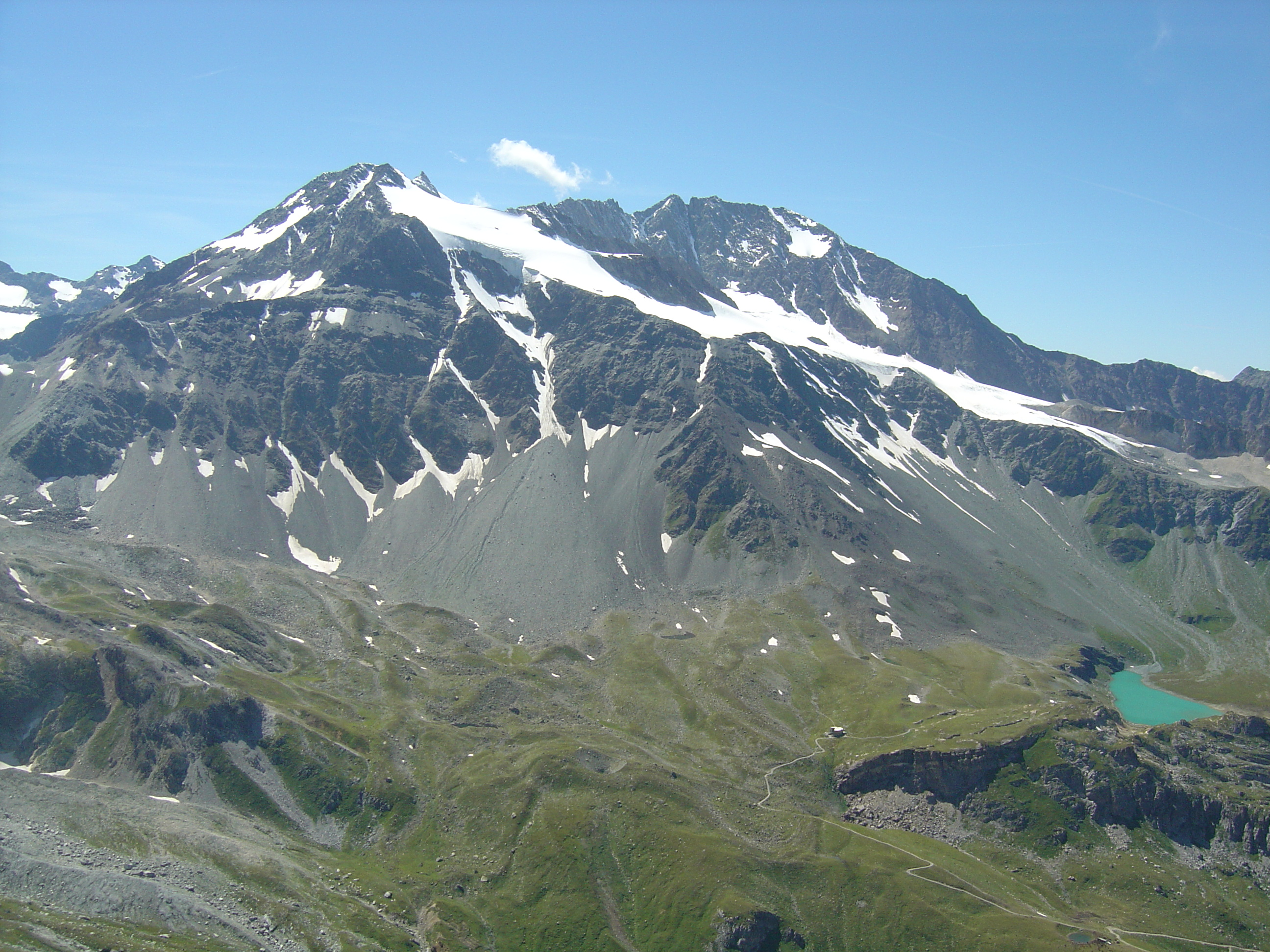

Highest point
- Elevation: 3,501 m (11,486 ft)
- Prominence: 27 m (89 ft)
- Coordinates: 45°16′35″N 06°38′25″E

Geography
- Location within France
- Location: Savoie, France
- Parent range: Massif de la Vanoise

Dôme de Polset is a mountain of Savoie, France. It lies in the Massif de la Vanoise range. It has an elevation of 3,501 metres above sea level.
