= Villarodin-Bourget =

- Commune
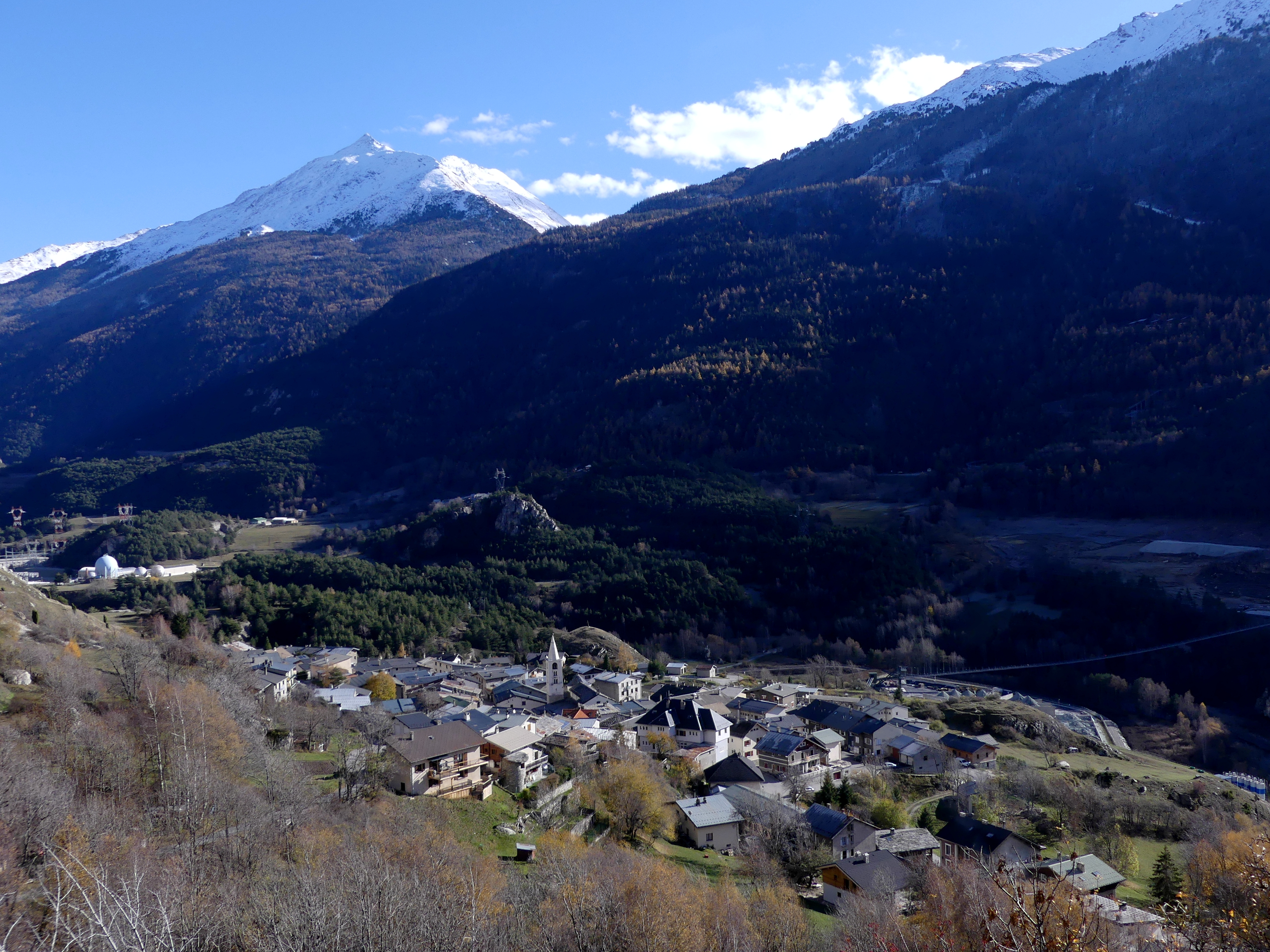
- Location of Villarodin-Bourget
- Location within France Location within Auvergne-Rhône-Alpes
- Coordinates: 45°12′53″N 6°41′50″E
- Country: France
- Region: Auvergne-Rhône-Alpes
- Department: Savoie
- Arrondissement: Saint-Jean-de-Maurienne
- Canton: Modane

Government
  - Mayor (2020–2026): Gilles Margueron
- Area^{1}: 33.08 km^{2} (12.77 sq mi)
- Highest elevation: 3,418 m (11,214 ft)
- Lowest elevation: 1,070 m (3,510 ft)
- Population (2023): 499
  - Density: 15.1/km^{2} (39.1/sq mi)
- Time zone: UTC+01:00 (CET)
  - Summer (DST): UTC+02:00 (CEST)
- INSEE/Postal code: 73322 /73500
- ^{1} French Land Register data, which excludes lakes, ponds, glaciers > 1 km^{2} (0.386 sq mi or 247 acres) and river estuaries.

Villarodin-Bourget (Arpitan: Velârôdin-lo-Borgèt) is a commune in the Savoie department in the Auvergne-Rhône-Alpes region in south-eastern France.

== See also ==
- Communes of the Savoie department
