= Fort du Replaton =

French fort

- Part of Séré de Rivières system
- Southeast France
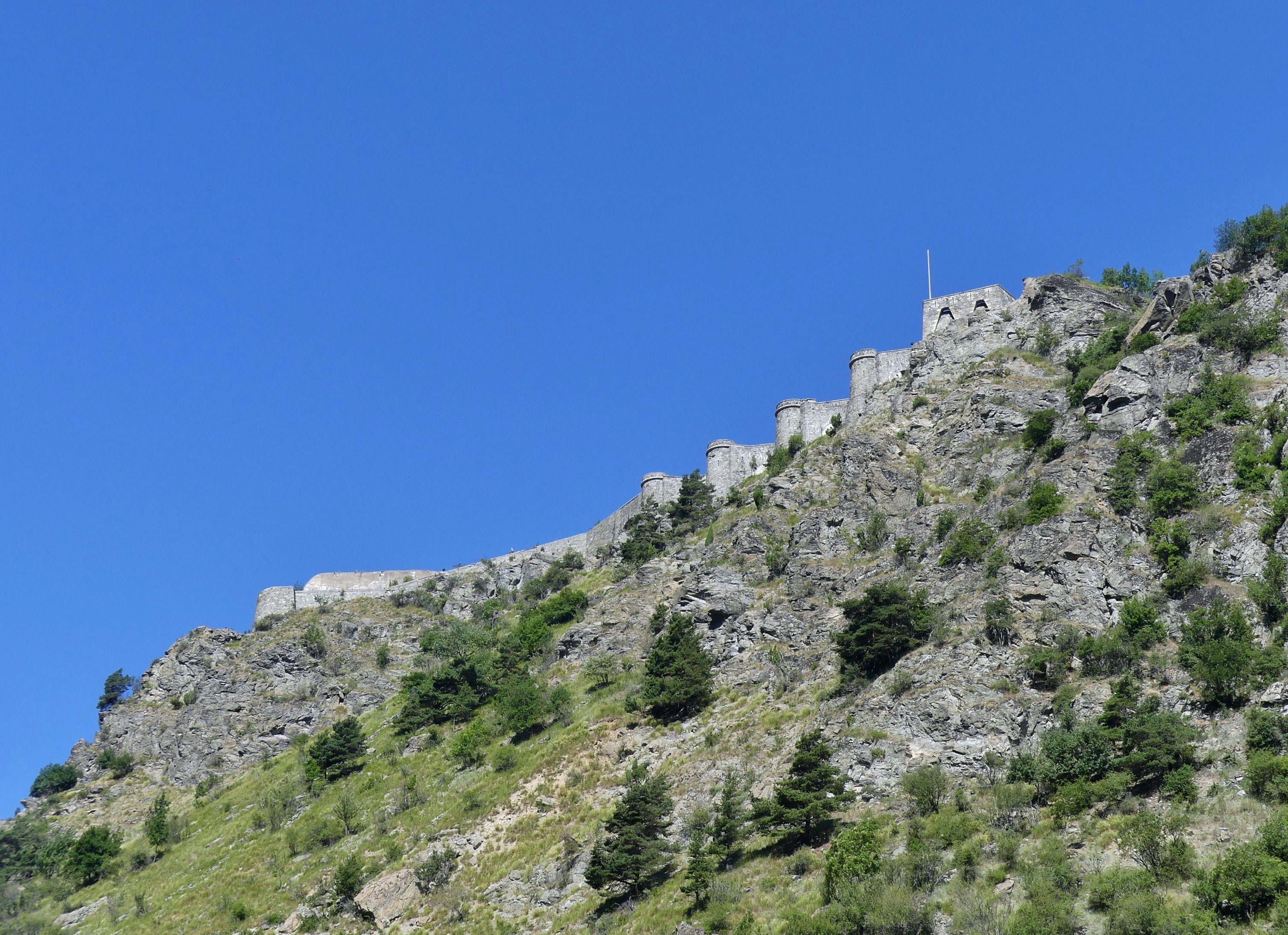

Site information
- Controlled by: France

Location
- Coordinates: 45.19718°N 6.65884°E

Site history
- In use: Abandoned
- Materials: Concrete, steel, rock excavation
- Battles/wars: Italian invasion of France

Garrison information
- Garrison: 162

The Fort du Replaton is a fortification of the Séré de Rivières system in Modane, France. The fort was built to provide artillery cover for the French end of the Fréjus Rail Tunnel 800 metres (2,600 ft) away horizontally. It is connected to Modane by an aerial tram, which continues on from Replaton to the Fort du Sapey on a much higher eminence.

The Fort du Replaton was built between 1884 and 1892 using an arrangement that anticipated the later Maginot Line fortifications, and resembles Fort Saint Michel near Toul. It cost approximately 2 million francs. Unlike a Maginot fortification, Replaton was enclosed by a perimeter wall and had surface barracks. The original armament consisted of two 95mm and two 155mm guns along a communicating gallery on the rock behind. The fort received concrete reinforcement in the early 1900s.

A renovation project in 1930 added 75mm guns in place of the 95mm weapons. The fort was fired upon in 1940 and 1944. It is the property of the Association de la Traversée es Alpes. It is not open to the public, but is in a good state of preservation.

== Redoute du Replaton ==
A smaller fortification occupies the eastern extremity of the small plateau, about 150 metres (490 ft) above Modane. It was armed with a single 95mm gun.

== See also ==
- Alpine Line

== Bibliography ==
- Mary, Jean-Yves; Hohnadel, Alain; Sicard, Jacques. Hommes et Ouvrages de la Ligne Maginot, Tome 5. Paris, Histoire & Collections, 2009. ISBN 978-2-35250-127-5 (in French)
