= Fortified Sector of Savoy =

The Fortified Section of Savoy (Secteur fortifié de la Savoie) was the French military organization that in 1940 controlled the section of the Alpine Line portion of the Maginot Line facing Italy in the Savoy region. The sector constituted part of the Alpine Line portion of the Maginot Line, between the Defensive Sector of the Rhône to the north, and the Fortified Sector of the Dauphiné to the south. The works combined a number of pre-1914 fortifications with Maginot-style ouvrages, with many forward-positioned cavern-style frontier stations or avant-postes that proved effective in holding invading forces near the border.

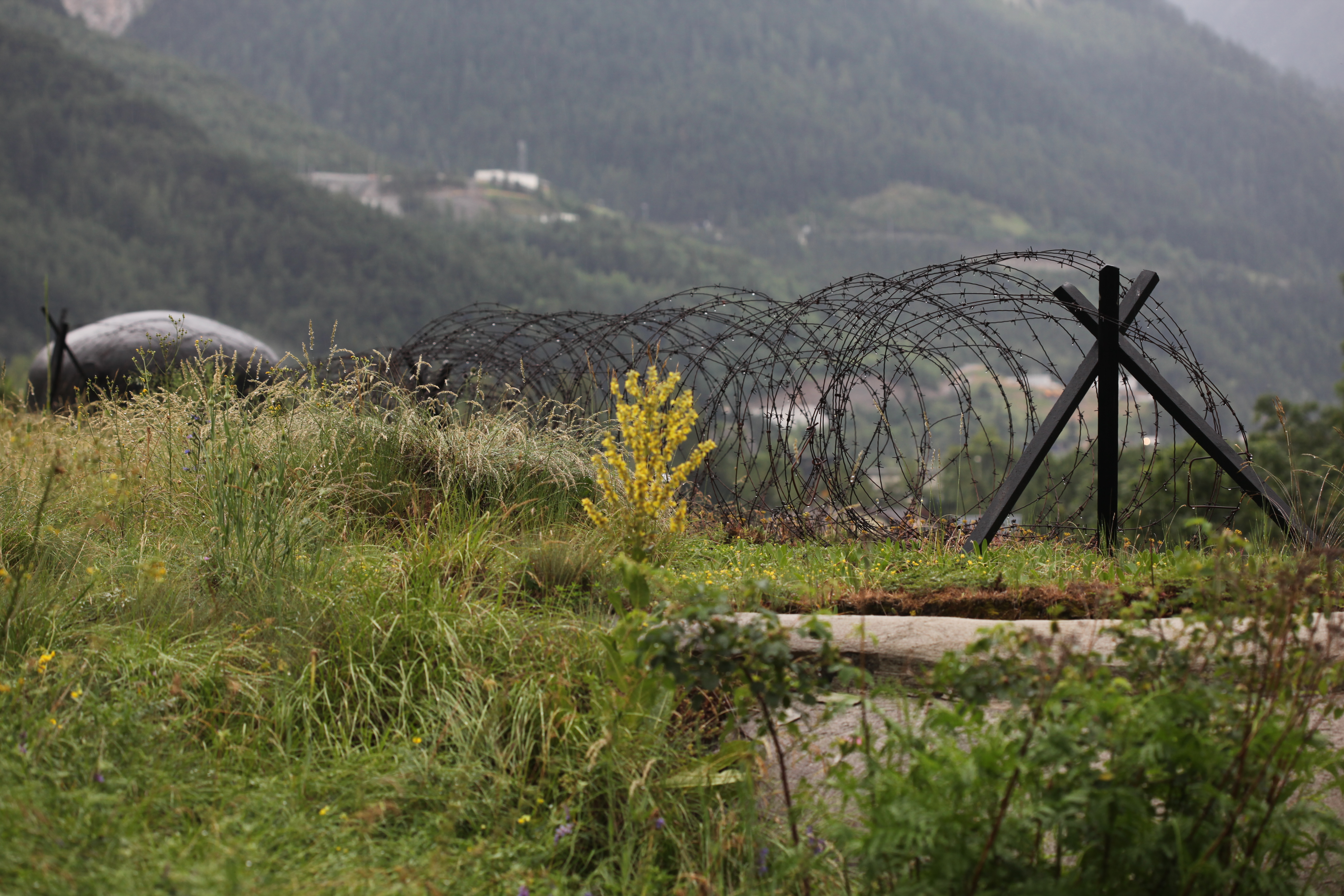
Surface of Ouvrage Saint-Gobain

The sector formed a discontinuous line about 100 kilometres (62 mi) long along France's frontier with Italy, from the Aiguille des Glaciers on the Mont Blanc massif, through Bourg-Saint-Maurice to the Moulinière peak on the Massif des Cerces, to Valloire. The sector's fortifications barred the valleys and passes crossing the Alps, particularly the routes over the Little St Bernard Pass via the Tarentaise Valley and the Mont Cenis pass via the Maurienne valley.

The sector's fortifications were built during the 1930s and saw combat during the Italian invasion of France in 1940 and later during the Second Battle of the Alps in 1944. The 1940s actions were successful in holding off the Italian invasion, but the surrender of France as a whole left the works in Italian occupation. Some of the fortifications were renovated in the 1950s, during the Cold War, and were finally abandoned by the end of the 1960s. Some of the fortifications have been maintained as museums, and may be visited.

== Concept and organization ==
The fortified sector was organized between World War I and World War II to counter a possible surprise attack by Italy. A portion of the garrison units were pre-positioned near the fortifications, which were to be occupied when a state of alert was declared. The organization changed over time, first during the French mobilization of August 1939, then with preparations for winter, when high-altitude positions had to be evacuated for the winter, then another deployment in the spring of 1940. French forces were dissolved in the armistice of 1940.

Initial fortification efforts in the Tarentaise sector were focused on the old forts of Redoute-Ruinée, the Fort du Truc and the Fort de Vulmis. Later efforts focused on the creation of a series of advanced posts and more heavily-constructed ouvrages (Note: English-language sources use the French term ouvrage as the preferred term for the Maginot positions, in preference to "fort", a term usually reserved for older fortifications with passive defenses in the form of walls and ditches. The literal translation of ouvrage in the sense of a fortification in English is "work." A gros ouvrage is a large fortification with a significant artillery component, while a petit ouvrage is smaller, with lighter arms.), including the petits ouvrages Cave-à-Canon and Chatelard near Bourg St. Maurice.

Fortification of the Maurienne valley followed a similar pattern, with advanced posts supported by the 19th century Fort du Replaton, the petit ouvrage Arrondaz and the gros ouvrages Saint-Antoine, Pas du Roc, Le Lavoir and Sapey.

Troop units for these fortifications were extensively customized to deal with the fragmented nature of the military positions. Typical, somewhat confusingly-named units included:

- Alpine Fortress Demi-Brigade (Demi-Brigade Alpin de Forteresse (DBAF) )
- Alpine Hunter Demi-Brigade (Demi-Brigade des Chasseurs Alpins (DBCA) )
- Alpine Infantry Regiment (Régiment d'Infanterie Alpin (RIA) )
- Alpine Fortress Battalion (Battaillon Alpin de Forteresse (BAF) )
- Alpine Hunter Battalion (Bataillon des Chasseurs Alpins (BCA) )

These formations were supplemented by Position Artillery Regiments (Régiments d'Artillerie de Position) (RAP) ), which provided mobile artillery support. A demi-brigade was similar to a large regiment, with three demi-brigades equivalent to four regiments.

== Command ==
The Savoy sector was commanded by General Lestian until 1939, under the overall command of the Army of the Alps. A series of colonels commanded the sector from 1939 into 1940. The sector's artillery support was provided by the 164th Position Artillery Regiment ((Régiment d'Artillerie de Position (RAP)), controlling both fixed and mobile artillery, commanded by Lieutenant Colonel de Feydeau de Saint-Christophe, and later by Colonel Montvernay. Command was at Chambéry until August 1939, after which posts moved frequently. In 1940 the sector was reinforced by the 66th Infantry Division, a class B reserve uni, under General Boucher, headquartered at St.-Jean-de-Maurienne.

== Description ==
The sector includes the following major fortified positions, together with the most significant casemates and infantry shelters in each sub-sector:

=== Tarentaise Valley ===
The Tarentaise was commanded by Colonel Michet de la Baume.

==== Sub-sector Beaufortin ====
16th Alpine Fortress Demi-Brigade, (16^{e} Demi-Brigade Alpin de Forteresse (DBAF)), Lt. Colonel Vergezac, command post at Beaubois and Pla-de-la-Lai

- Avant-poste de Seloges, MOM 1931

==== Sub-Sector Tarentaise ====
215th Infantry Regiment (215^{e} Régiment d'Infanterie (RI)), Lt. Colonel de Branges, command post at Picollard

- Fort de la Redoute Ruinée, pre-1914
- Avant-poste le Planay, MOM 1939
- Abri/avant-poste la Tête du Plane, MOM 1931
- Abri/avant-poste Les Savonnes, MOM 1931

===== Bourg-Saint-Maurice Barrier =====
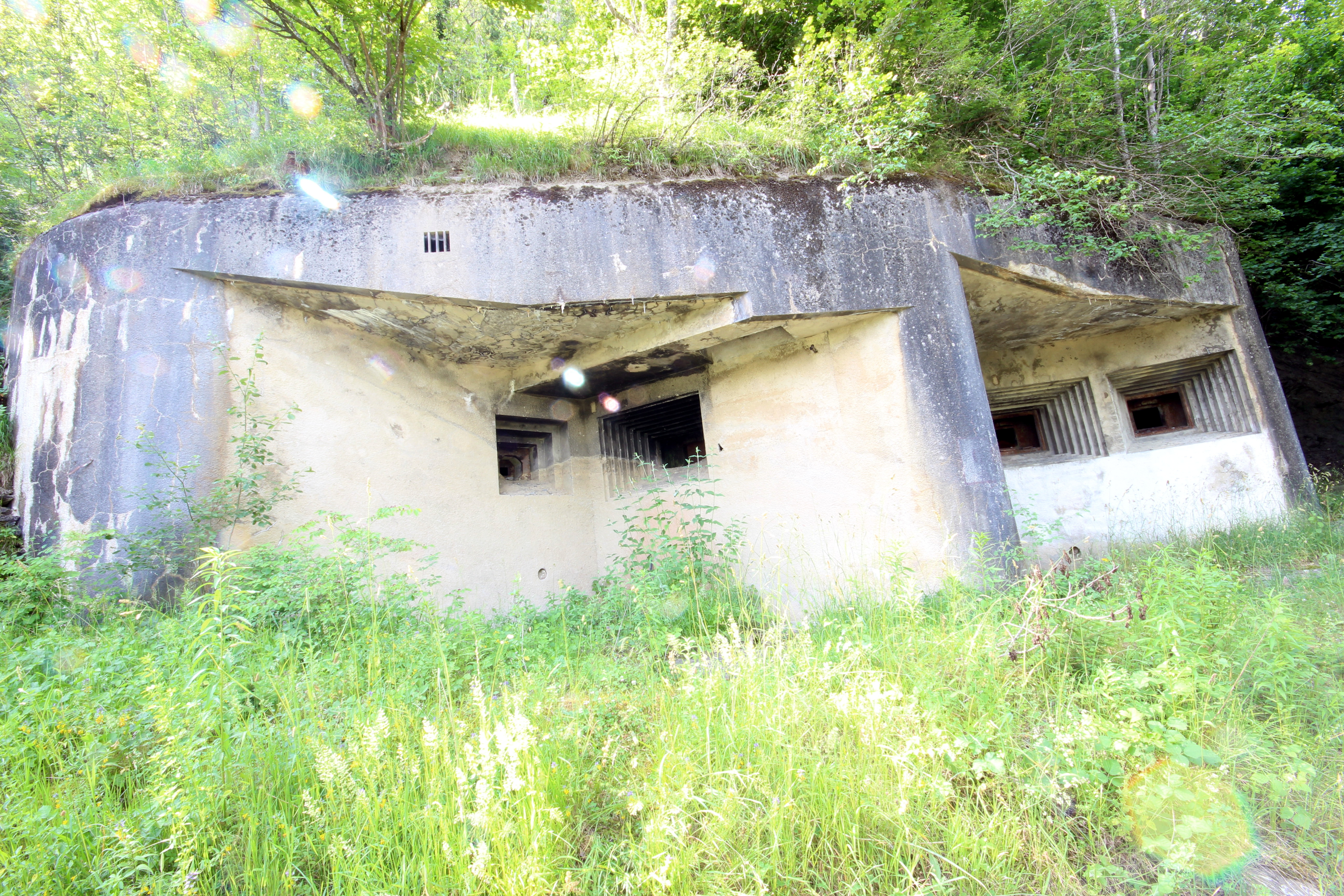
Ouvrage Cave-à-Canon

- Barrier Versoyen, CORF and MOM
- Ouvrage Chatelard, CORF 1938, petit ouvrage, one block
- Ouvrage Cave-à-Canon, CORF 1937, petit ouvrage, one block
- Ouvrage Haricot de Villaroger, MOM 1939, never completed
- Fort de Vulmix, pre-1914
- Fort le Truc, pre-1914
- Blockhaus du Platte, pre-1914
- Batterie Courbaton, pre-1914

Troops were housed at Bourg-Saint-Maurice.

==== Sub-sector Palet-Vanoise ====
70th Alpine Fortress Battalion (70^{e} Battaillon de Alpin de Forteresse (BAF)), command post at Prolagnon

- Avant-poste la Vanoise, MOM 1932

Additional positions in the Arly, Doron de Beaufort, Doron de Bozel and Tarentaise valleys.

=== Maurienne Valley ===
The Maurienne was commanded by General Boucher.

==== Sub-sector Haut-Maurienne ====
281st Infantry Regiment (281^{e} Régiment d'Infanterie (RI)), Lt. Colonel Roussel, command post at Solières

===== Quartier du Mont-Cenis =====
- Abri Ouillon, MOM
- Blockhaus le Mollard A/B, MOM
- Blockhaus les Arcellins, MOM
- Avant-poste Les Revets, MOM

===== Quarter du Val d'Ambin =====
- Blockhaus Mont-Froid, pre-1914
- Abri la Beccia, pre-1914
- Abri Ouest de la Tuile, MOM 1939
- Abri Crois de Colleret, MOM 1939
- Abri Caisse Blanche, MOM

Troops were housed at Sollières.

==== Sub-sector Moyenne-Maurienne ====
30th Alpine Fortress Demi-Brigade (30^{e} demi-Brigade Alpin de Forteresse (DBAF)), Lt. Colonel Laflaquière, command post at the Fort du Sapey

===== Quartier d'Amodon =====
Command post at Chalets La Perrière

- Abri l'Ogère, MOM
- Abri and Observatory Amodon, MOM

===== Quarter de l'Arc =====
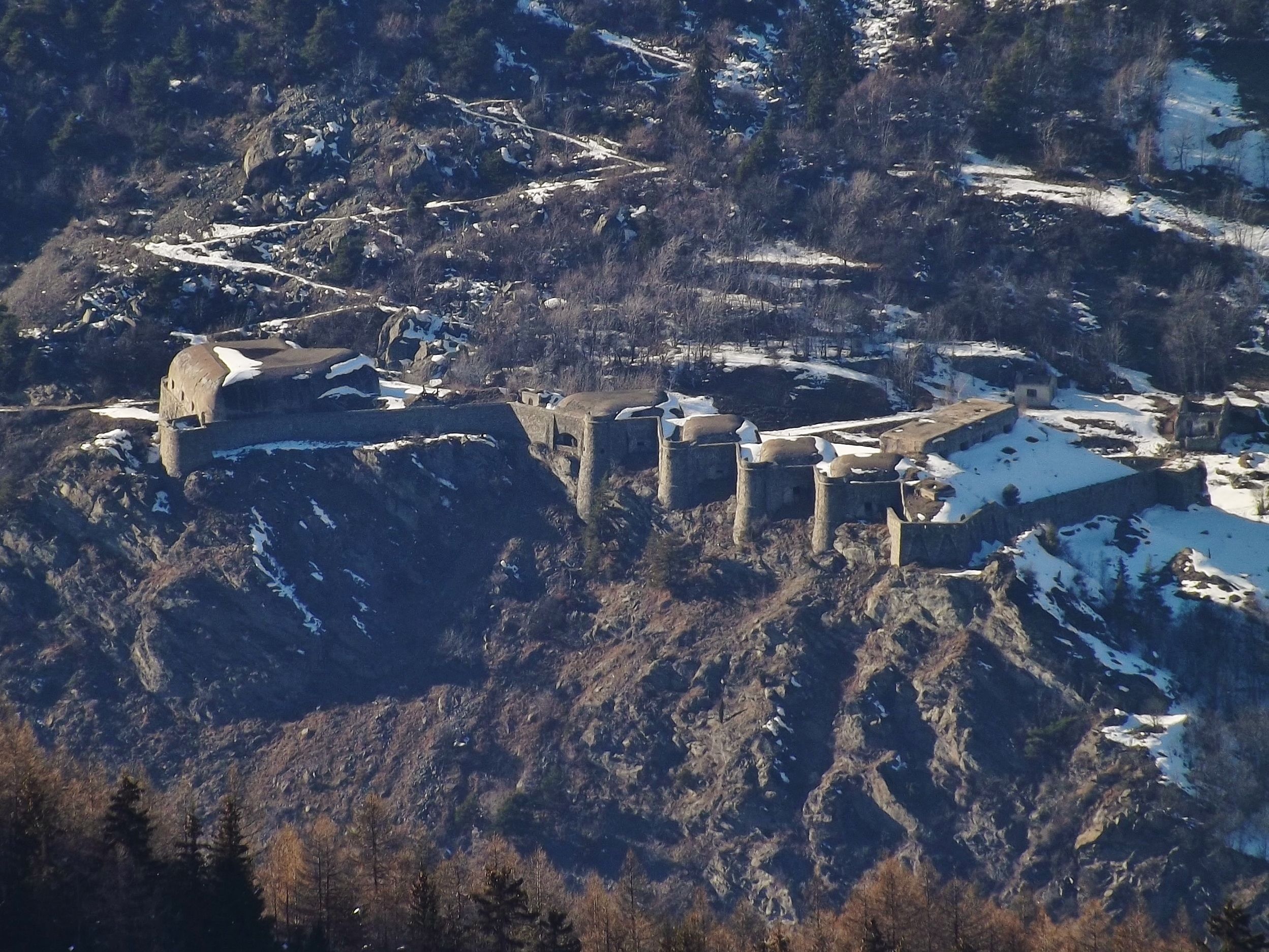
Fort du Replaton

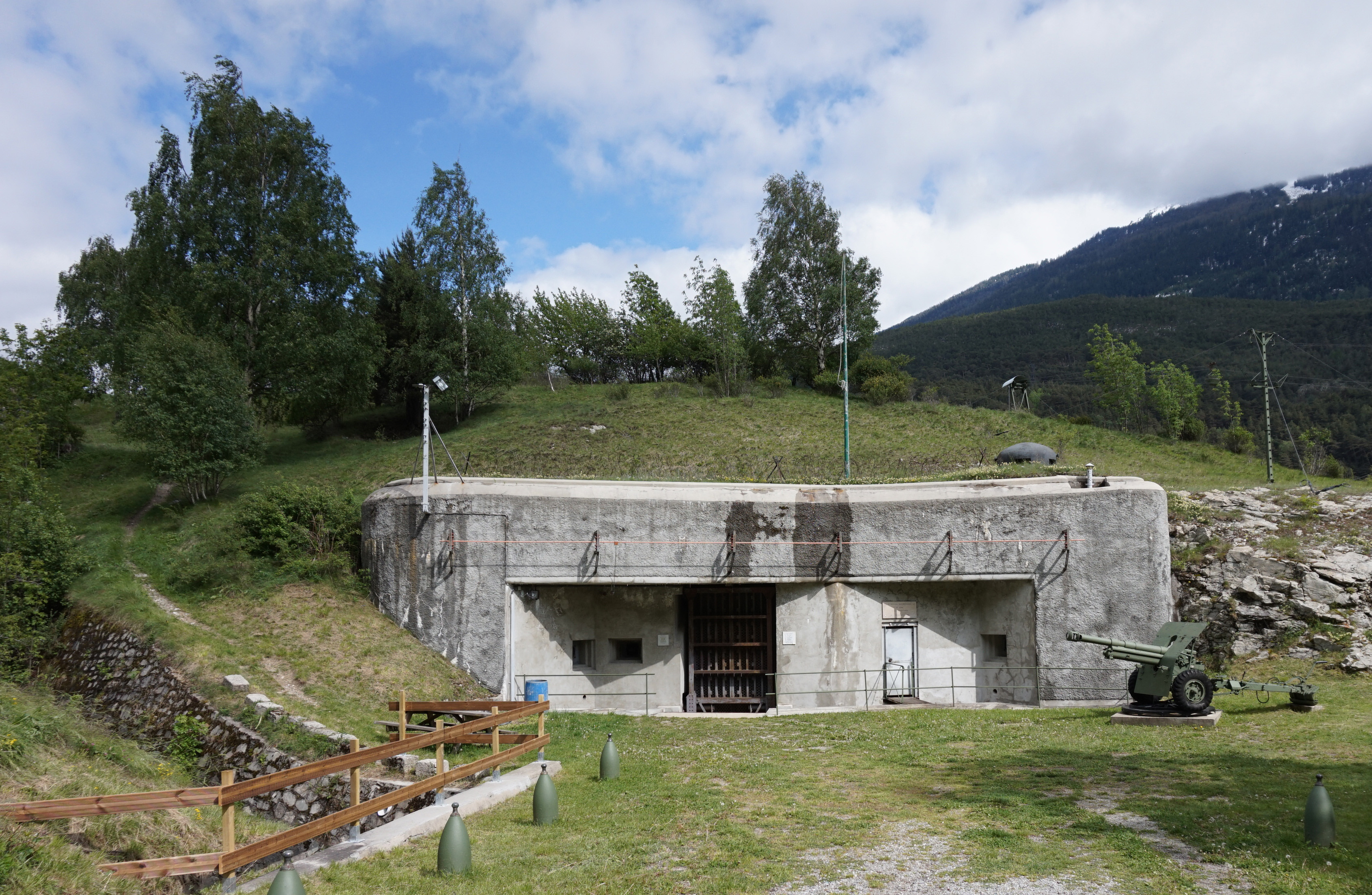
Ouvrage Saint-Gobain

Sub-Quarter of Modane

- Ouvrage Sapey, gros ouvrage of four blocks, CORF
- Fort Sapey, pre-1914
- Fort Replaton, pre-1914
- Ouvrage Saint-Gobain, gros ouvrage of four blocks, CORF
- Ouvrage Saint-Antoine, gros ouvrage of 2 blocks, CORF
- Casemate annex Saint-Antoine (CORF)
- Fréjus Rail Tunnel defenses, blockhouse

===== Quartier des Cols Sud =====
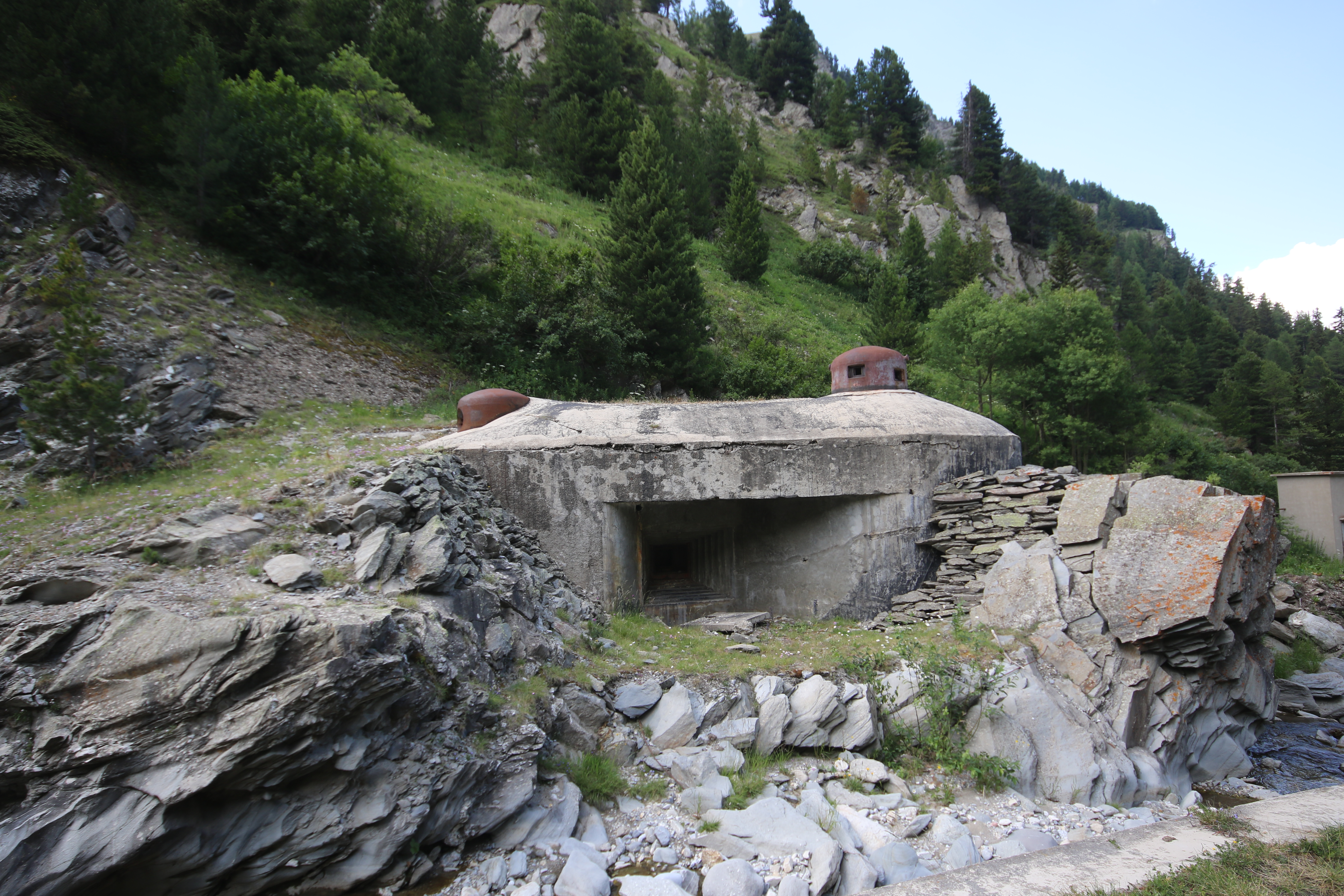
Le Lavoir munitions entrance

Command post at Lavoir

Sub-Quarter Arplane

- Observation posts at Granges at Turra d'Arplane

Sub-Quarter Lavoir

- Ouvrage Le Lavoir, gros ouvrage of five blocks, CORF
- Ouvrage Pas du Roc, gros ouvrage of four blocks.
- Avant-poste le Fréjus, MOM 1931
- Avant-poste la Roue, MOM 1931
- Avant-poste Vallée-Étroite, MOM 1931
- Ouvrage Arrondaz, petit ouvrage of two half-ouvrages

Sub-Quarter Bissorte

- Mobile units protecting the Bissorte Dam and nearby passes

==== Sub-sector Basse-Maurienne ====
343rd Infantry Regiment (343^{e} Regiment d'Infanterie (RI)), Lt. Colonel Dusaud, command post at the Fort du Télégraphe

===== Quartier de Valloire =====
- Ouvrage Les Rochilles, petit ouvrage of three blocks, MOM

Second Position

- Fort du Télégraphe, pre-1914
- Blockhaus Col des Trois-Croix, MOM

== History ==
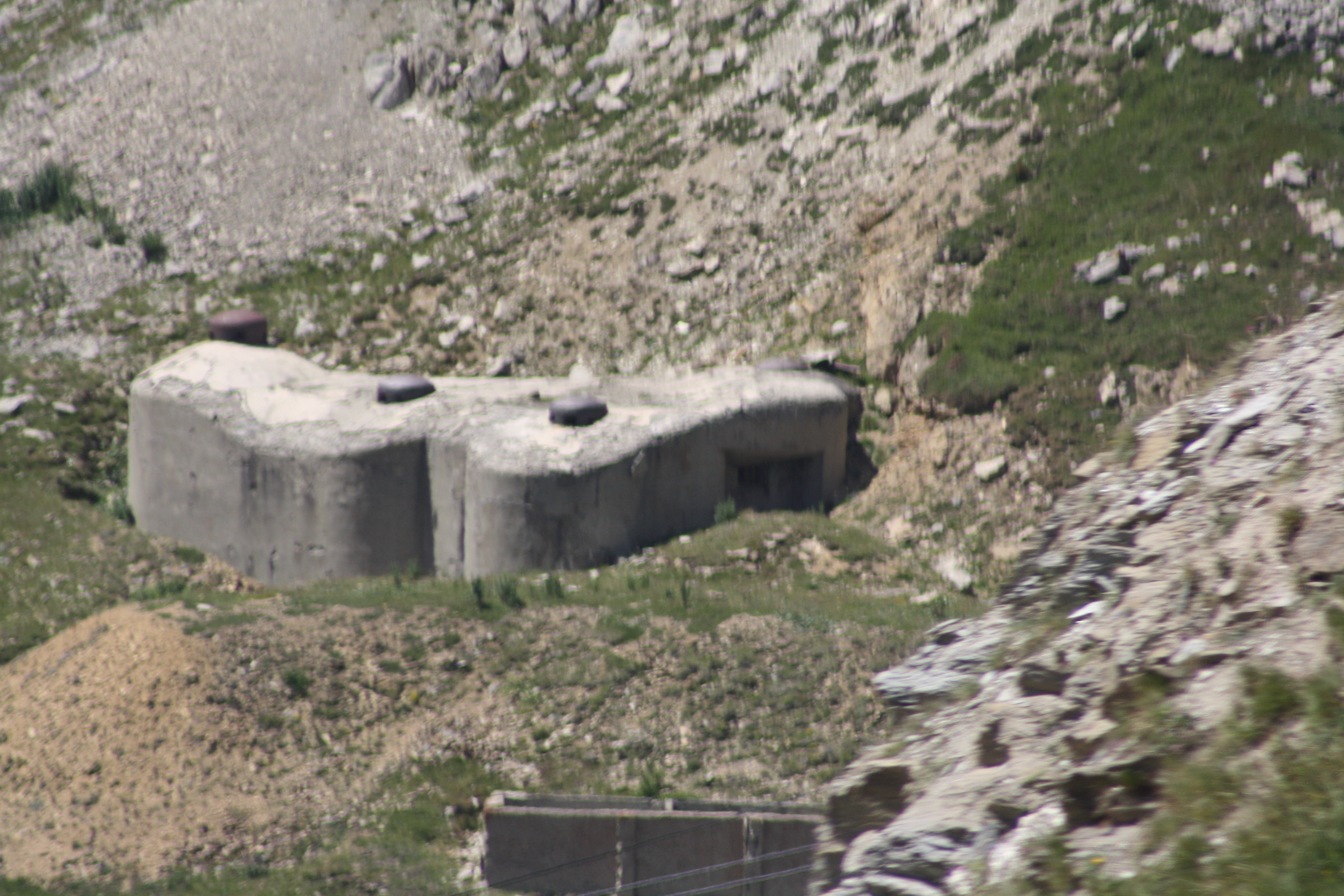
Ouvrage Pas du Roc

Italy declared war on France on 10 June 1940. Late snows in the area slowed down the Italian attack, which did not start until 20 June. In Savoy, the Italian Alpine Corps attacked over the Col de la Seigne and the Little St Bernard Pass in Operation Bernardo., with the Italian 1st Corps attacking over the Mont Cenis Pass. About 5500 French troops were deployed against 50,000 Italian soldiers. . The Italian Taurinense Alpine division moved over the Col de la Seigne, stopped by sustained fire from the avant-poste of Seloges. The Trieste motorized division crossed the Little St. Bernard Pass after bombarding he Redoute-Ruinée post for eight hours. The initial Italian assault was stopped at the walls of the fort. Attacks continued over the next two days, then stopped until the armistice, but the avant-poste was isolated and bypassed, Italian troops moving close to Bourg-Saint-Maurice and Sainte-Foye. Redoute-Ruinėe was finally evacuated by French forces on 2 July. Total casualties in the area amounted to 9 French dead, and 72 Italian dead with more than 700 Italian wounded.

In the Maurienne valley, 13,000 French troops faced 40,000 Italian troops. Italian forces advanced on the Mont Cenis road and moved across the high plateau along the frontier. The Italian attack was supported by forts in the Italian Alpine Wall positions. The French La Turra outpost on the Mont Cenis road was bombarded by the Italian Fort Paradiso, but the Cagliari Division could not advance past La Turra. Other elements of the Cagliari Division tried to advance on the Little Mont Cenis Pass and entered the valley of the Arc river, but were held there by the line of avant-postes. Nearer Modane, the Superga Division crossed the Col du Fréjus and came under fire from ouvrages Arrondaz, Pas du Roc and Le Lavoir, backed up by covering artillery in the valley at Sapey, Saint-Antoine and Saint-Gobain. Arrondaz and Pas-du-Roc fired on Italian troops on each others' superstructures and drove them off. Italian forces made little progress against the mutually-supporting fire until the cease-fire of 25 June. Casualties were 4 French dead and 108 Italians, with 1,000 Italians wounded.

The armistice of 24 June 1940 ended fighting, and the fortifications were occupied by Italian troops. The Fortified Sector of Savoy was dissolved by French forces on 15 July 1940.

=== 1944-1945 ===
Modane was liberated on 13 September 1944, with no significant resistance from the Maginot fortifications. German forces retreated up the Mont Cenis pass, and fighting ceased until the spring of 1945. On 23 March 1945, French forces bombarded the area and advanced to Redoute-Ruiné by 31 March. However, the fortification was not captured for another month. Fighting took place around Mont-Froid through April, until German forces abandoned Mont Cenis on 25 April.

== Present status ==
Saint-Gobain has been preserved as a museum and may be visited.

== See also ==
- Alpine Wall

== Bibliography ==
- Allcorn, William. The Maginot Line 1928-45. Oxford: Osprey Publishing, 2003. ISBN 1-84176-646-1
- Kaufmann, J.E. and Kaufmann, H.W. Fortress France: The Maginot Line and French Defenses in World War II, Stackpole Books, 2006. ISBN 0-275-98345-5
- Kaufmann, J.E., Kaufmann, H.W., Jancovič-Potočnik, A. and Lang, P. The Maginot Line: History and Guide, Pen and Sword, 2011. ISBN 978-1-84884-068-3
- Mary, Jean-Yves; Hohnadel, Alain; Sicard, Jacques. Hommes et Ouvrages de la Ligne Maginot, Tome 2. Paris, Histoire & Collections, 2001. ISBN 2-908182-97-1 (in French)
- Mary, Jean-Yves; Hohnadel, Alain; Sicard, Jacques. Hommes et Ouvrages de la Ligne Maginot, Tome 4 - La fortification alpine. Paris, Histoire & Collections, 2009. ISBN 978-2-915239-46-1 (in French)
- Mary, Jean-Yves; Hohnadel, Alain; Sicard, Jacques. Hommes et Ouvrages de la Ligne Maginot, Tome 5. Paris, Histoire & Collections, 2009. ISBN 978-2-35250-127-5 (in French)
