= Pointe de Paumont =

Mountain in Italy

- Cima del Vallone
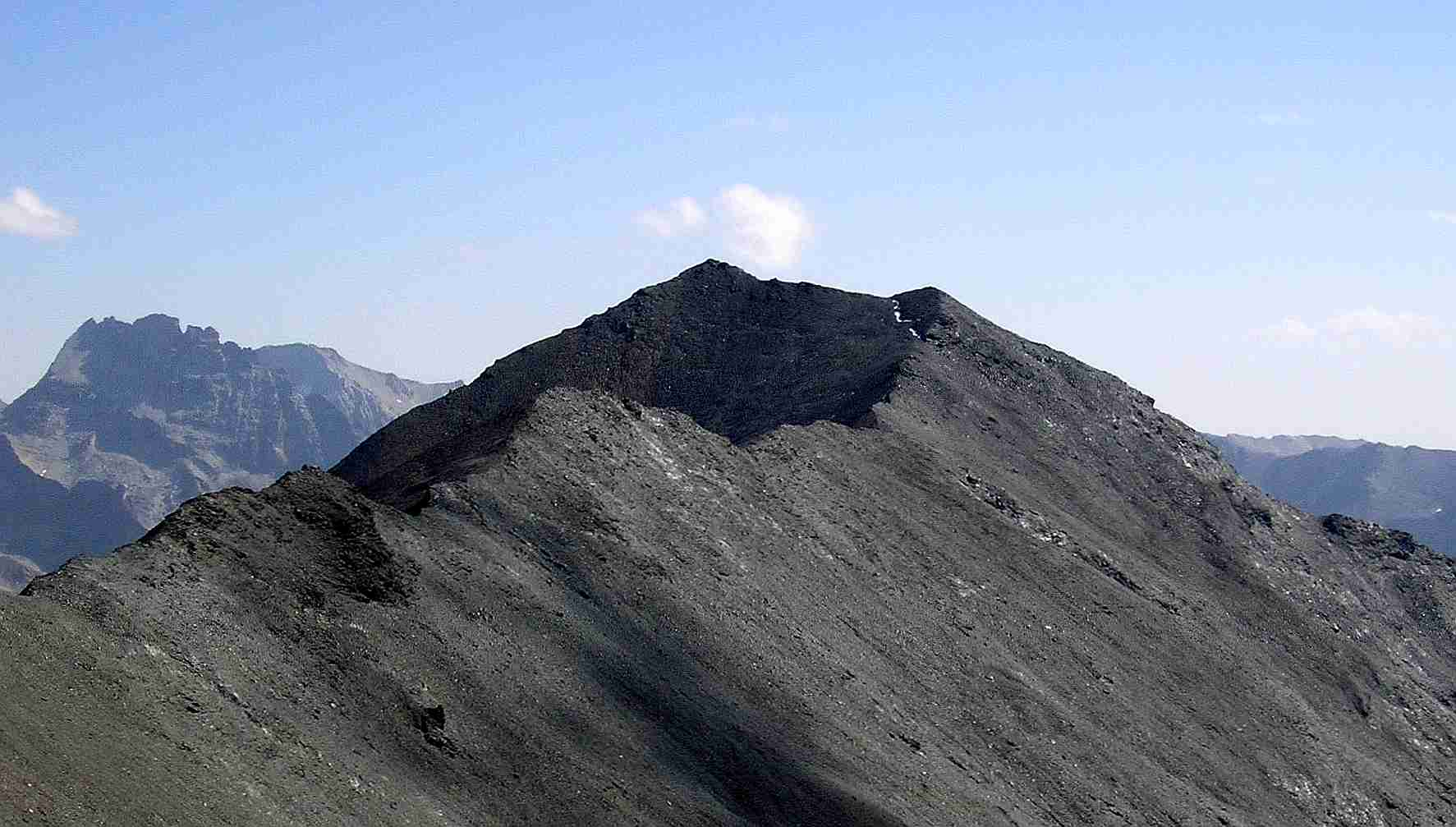
- The mountain seen from Punta Bagnà

Highest point
- Elevation: 3,171 m (10,404 ft)
- Prominence: 378 m (1,240 ft)
- Parent peak: Aiguille de Scolette
- Isolation: 3.21 km (1.99 mi)
- Listing: Alpine mountains above 3000 m
- Coordinates: 45°08′21″N 06°43′41″E

Geography
- Location within Alps
- Location: Rhône-Alpes, France; Piedmont, Italy
- Parent range: Cottian Alps

Climbing
- Easiest route: from Pelouse pass (E ridge) or Roccia Verde pass (S ridge)

Pointe de Paumont (in French) or Cima del Vallone (in Italian) is a mountain of Savoie, France and of the Province of Turin, Italy. It lies in the Cottian Alps range. It has an elevation of 3,171 metres above sea level.

== Etymology ==
Paumort, the name used on French maps, should come from a toponym used on the Italian side of the mountain (croce di Paumont, rio di Paumont), which derives from Piedmontese "pàu mòrt" («fear of death»).

== Geography ==
In the French subdivision of Western Alps it belongs to the Massif du Mont-Cenis while in the SOIUSA (International Standardized Mountain Subdivision of the Alps) it' the highest mountain of a subgroups (STG) called Crête Grand Vallon-pointe du Fréjus ( Fr) or Cresta Gran Vallone-punta del Fréjus (It) - code:I/A-4.III-B.5.a.

Administratively the mountain is divided between the commune of Avrieux (F, north face) and the comune of Bardonecchia (I, south-western and south-eastern faces).

== Access to the summit ==
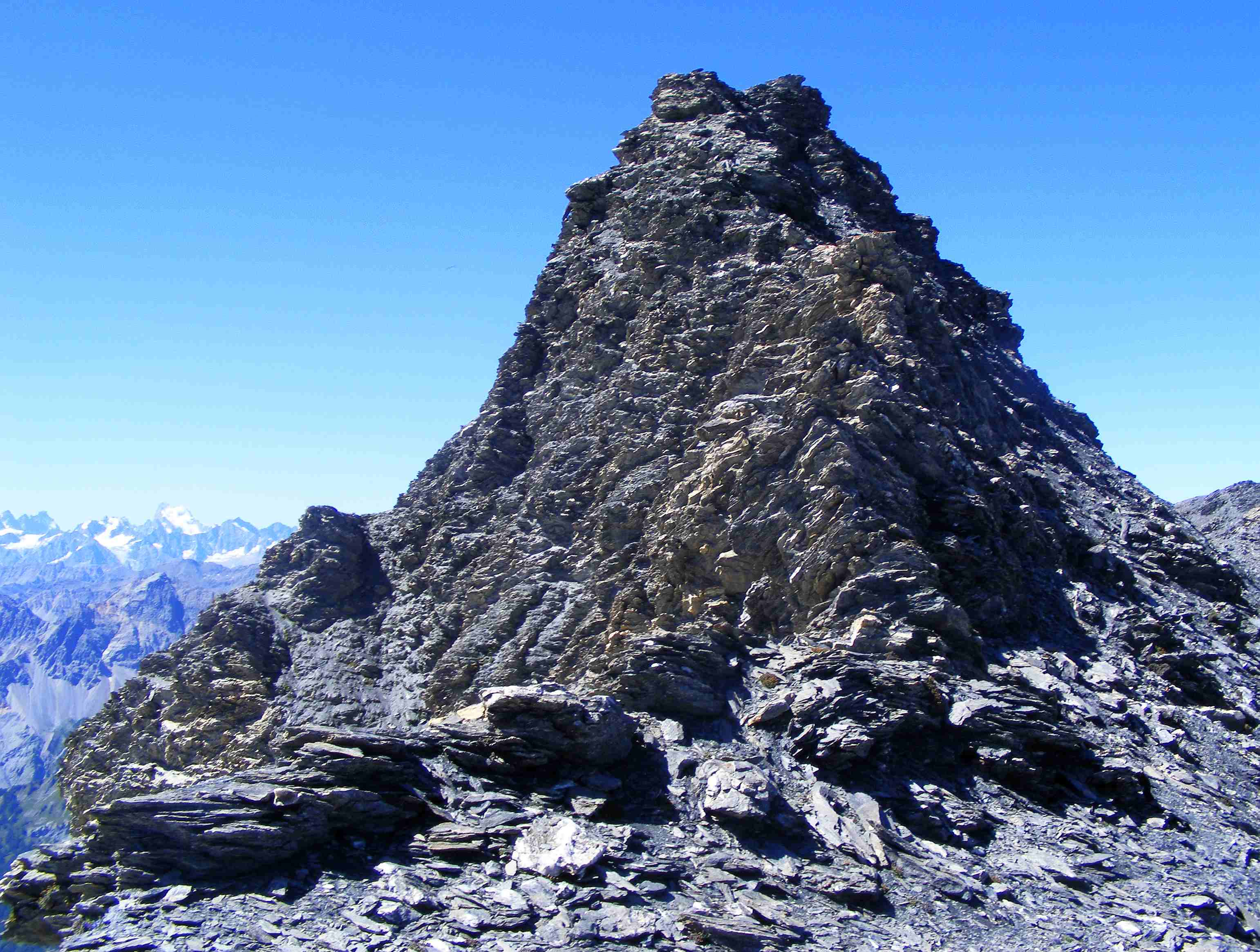
Eastern side of the summit.

The easiest route for the summit starts from Pelouse's pass, which connects Avrieux and Bardonecchia, and follows the eastern ridge of the mountain passing by Cime Gardoria/Cima Gardiola (3,137 m). Other two routes, roughly of the same climbing grade, follow the other two ridges which meet on the mountain's summit: the southern one from Roccia Verde pass and the northwestern one from Punta Bagnà.

== Maps ==
- Italian official cartography (Istituto Geografico Militare - IGM); on-line version: www.pcn.minambiente.it
- French official cartography (Institut Géographique National - IGN); on-line version: www.geoportail.fr
- Istituto Geografico Centrale - Carta dei sentieri e dei rifugi scala 1:50.000 n.1 Valli di Susa Chisone e Germanasca and 1:25.000 n.104 Bardonecchia Monte Thabor Sauze d'Oulx
