= Punta Bagnà =

Mountain in Italy

- Cime du Grand Vallon
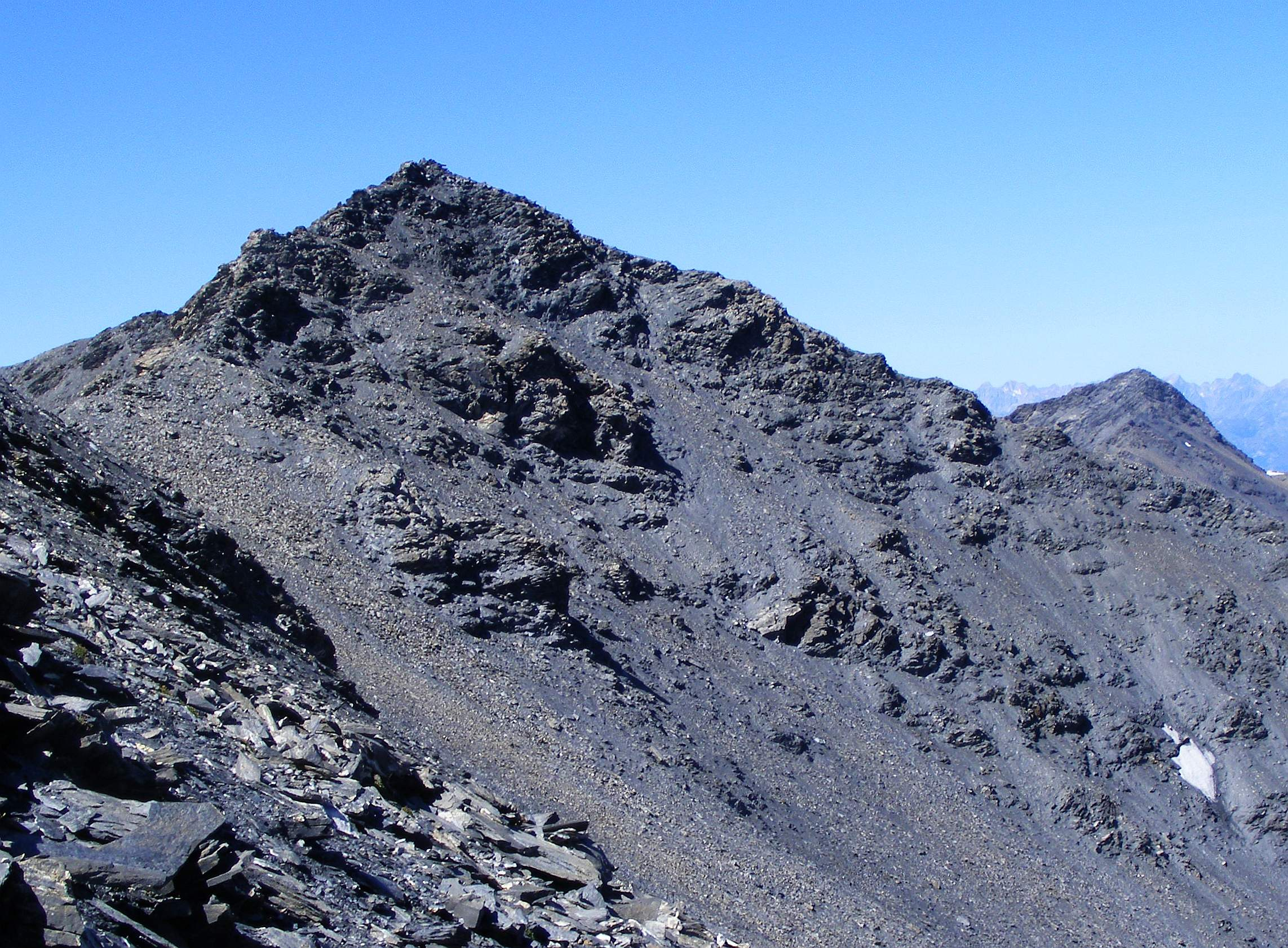
- The mountain seen from pointe de Paumont

Highest point
- Elevation: 3,129 m (10,266 ft)
- Prominence: 84 m (276 ft)
- Parent peak: Pointe de Paumont
- Isolation: 1.43 km (0.89 mi)
- Coordinates: 45°08′41″N 06°42′41″E

Geography
- Location within Alps
- Location: Rhône-Alpes, France; Piedmont, Italy
- Parent range: Cottian Alps

Climbing
- Easiest route: from Col du Fréjus, punta del Fréjus and W ridge

Punta Bagnà (in Italian) or Cime du Grand Vallon (in French) is a mountain of Savoie, France and of the Province of Turin, Italy. It lies in the Cottian Alps range. It has an elevation of 3,129 metres above sea level.

== Etymology ==
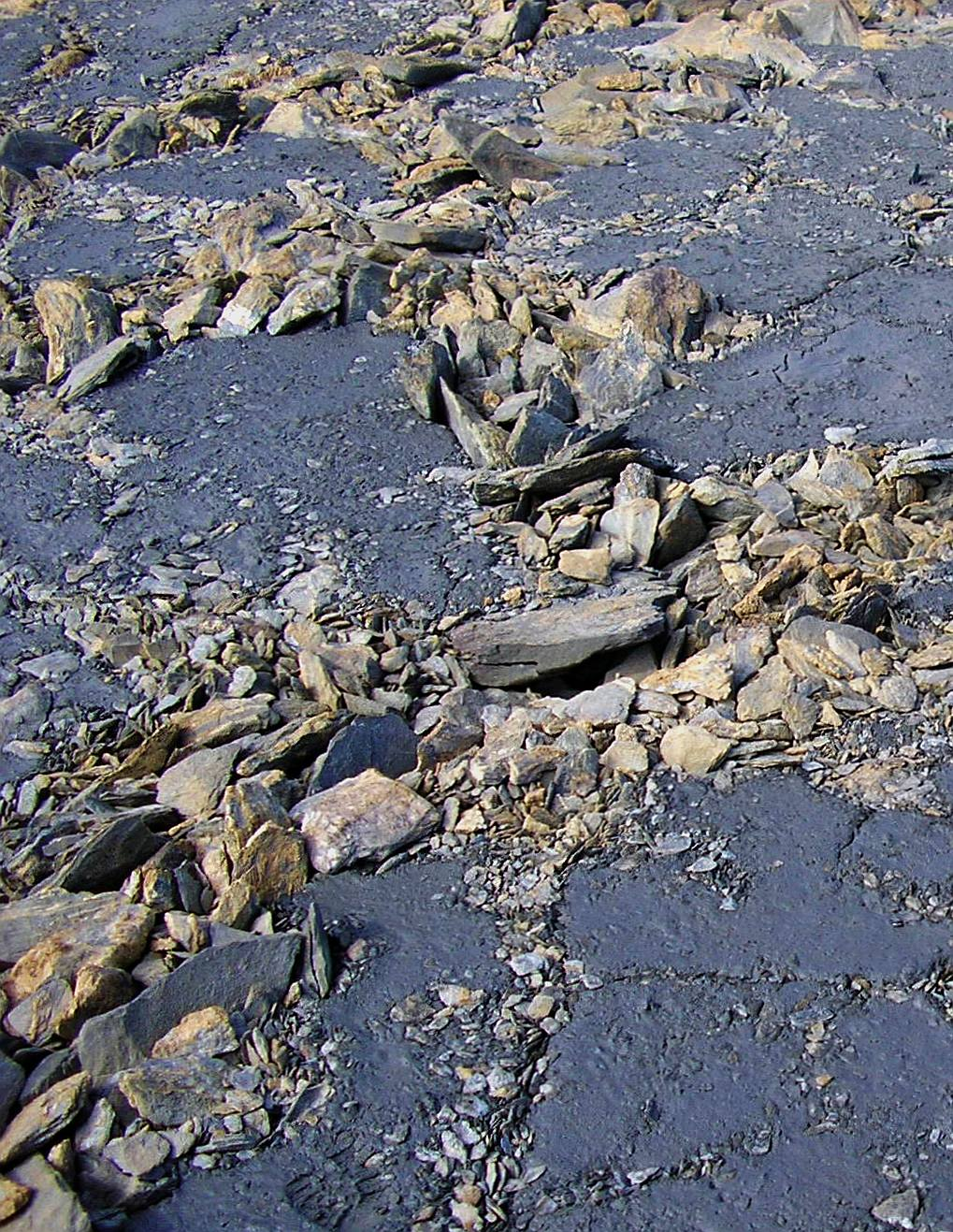
Blackish ground near the summit.

The name used on the Italian maps comes from Piedmontese "Bagnà" («wet»), which should derive from the look of the blackish fine ground nearby the summit. The French name comes from the "Grand Vallon", a secondary valley which starts from the mountain and goes northwards towards Charmaix and Modane.

== Geography ==
In the French subdivision of western Alps it belongs to the Massif du Mont-Cenis while in the SOIUSA (International Standardized Mountain Subdivision of the Alps) it is part of the mountain group called "gruppo della Pierre Menue" (Italian) or "groupe de l'Aiguille de Scolette" (French).

Administratively the mountain is divided between the Italian comune of Bardonecchia (southern face) and the French communes of Modane (north-western face) and Avrieux (north-eastern face).

== Access to the summit ==
The easiest route for the summit starts from col du Fréjus, which connects Modane and Bardonecchia, then passes by punta del Fréjus and follows the south-western ridge of the mountain.

== Maps ==
- Italian official cartography (Istituto Geografico Militare - IGM); on-line version: www.pcn.minambiente.it
- French official cartography (Institut Géographique National - IGN); on-line version: www.geoportail.fr
- Istituto Geografico Centrale - Carta dei sentieri e dei rifugi scala 1:50.000 n. 1 Valli di Susa Chisone e Germanasca e 1:25.000 n. 104 Bardonecchia Monte Thabor Sauze d'Oulx
