= Col de Pelouse =

Mountain pass on the border between France and Italy

Coordinates: 45°08′32″N 06°44′55″E

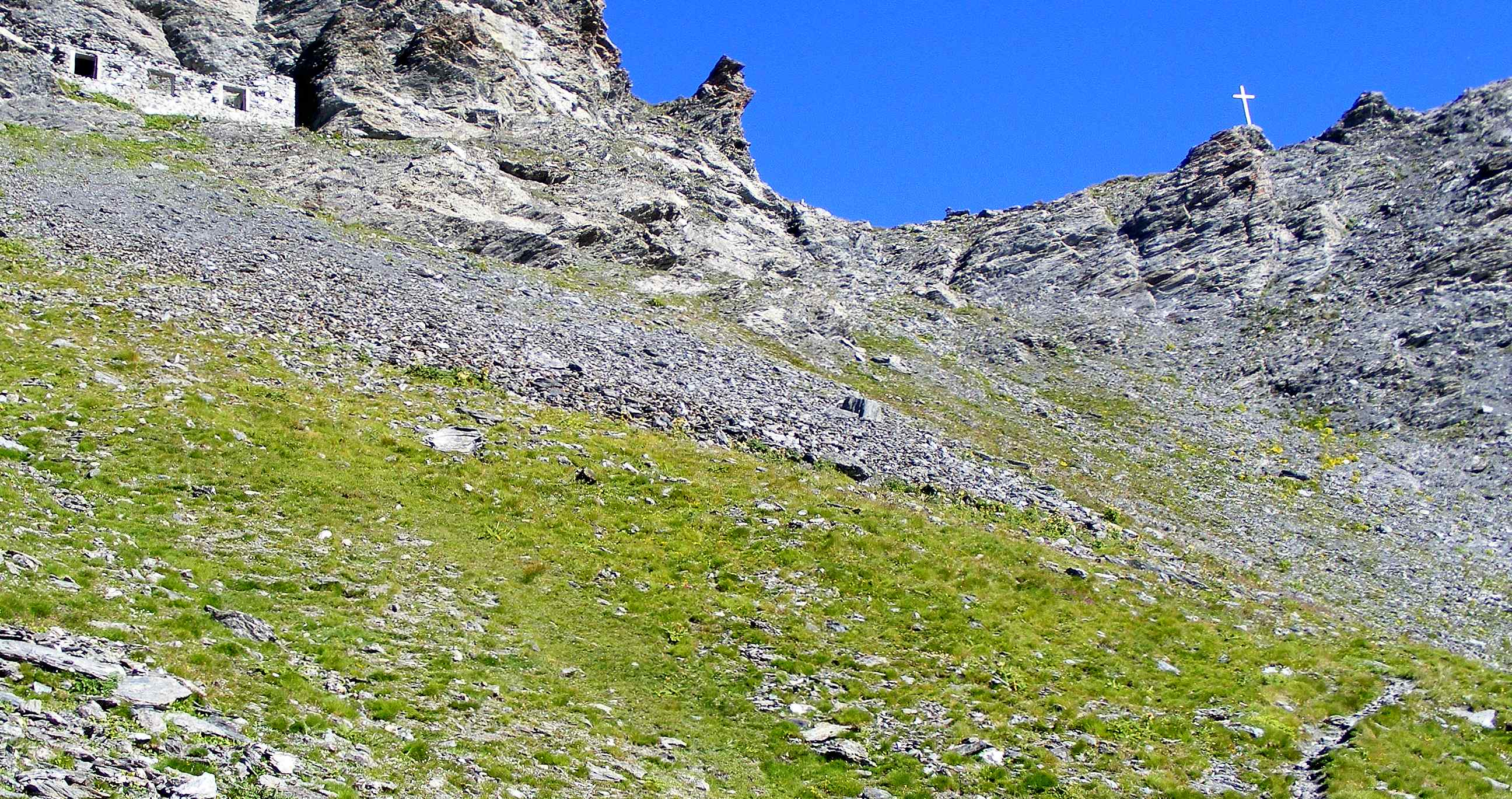
The pass as viewed from the Italian side. The ruined barracks are visible at top left.

The Col de Pelouse (Italian: Colle della Pelouse) is a mountain pass in the Alps on the border between France and Italy. It lies at an elevation of 2,793 metres (9,163 ft) and has a north–south orientation. On the northern (French) side, the pass leads into the valley of the Maurienne; on the southern (Italian) side, the Val di Susa. To its west rises the summit of Gardoria, a mountain peak (elevation 3136 metres/10,289 ft) in the Mont Cenis on the France-Italy border, and to its east that of Aiguille de Scolette. It lies close to the Fréjus Road Tunnel that connects Avrieux in France with Bardonecchia in Italy.

A small barracks, Bivacco LXIII, lies in ruins on the Italian side along the last stretch of the path that climbs to the Pelouse Hill starting from the lake area. It was also connected to the Casermetta LXI by a path that has now disappeared. It was built in 1939 to house twenty soldiers. In 1940, during the Italian invasion of France, Italian troops passed through the Col de Pelouse. There was fighting just north of the pass on the French side.

For mountaineers, the Col de Pelouse is the easiest start point for climbing the Aiguille de Scolette or the Pointe de Paumont to the west.
