= Ouvrage Arrondaz =

- Part of Maginot Line, Alpine Line
- Southeast France

Site information
- Controlled by: France

Location
- Coordinates: 45.14525°N 6.65934°E

Site history
- Built by: CORF
- In use: Partly buried, one block used as shop
- Materials: Concrete, steel, rock excavation
- Battles/wars: Battle of France

Ouvrage Arrondaz is a lesser work (petit ouvrage) of the Maginot Line's Alpine extension, the Alpine Line, also known as the Little Maginot Line. The ouvrage consists of one entry block, one infantry block, and one observation block fin the vicinity of the Col de Fréjus to the south of Modane at an altitude of 2,500 metres (8,200 ft). All but one of the blocks are presently buried by later construction.

== Description ==
- Block 1 (observation): One observation cloche.
- Block 2 (infantry): Two twin heavy machine gun embrasures.
- Entry block: One machine gun embrasure.
- Emergency exit block: One machine gun embrasure.

A second position, or demi-ouvrage, was planned for the other side of the Col du Fréjus road, linked by an underground gallery. The Ouvrage Stokes was to have two blocks, an entry and an emergency exit block, disposed similarly to the Arrondaz blocks, but with mortars. Construction of the ouvrage was canceled after the discovery of rock with gypsum deposits and solution cavities.

== History ==
On 22 June 1940 during the Italian invasion of France, the ouvrage was attacked with its neighbor gros ouvrage Pas du Roc by the 1 Infantry Division Superga. Supporting fire from neighboring positions repelled the attack Further action took place on the 23rd, when Arrondaz, Le Lavoir and Pas du Roc cooperated to fire on Italian troops on the surface of Arrondaz. 75mm guns at Ouvrage Sapey also fired on the surface of Arrondaz. Sapey fired 246 shots at Arrondaz on the 24th. The following day, an armistice brought action to a halt.

After the 1940 armistice, Italian forces occupied the Alpine ouvrages and disarmed them. In August 1943, southern France was occupied by the German 19th Army, which took over many of the Alpine positions that had been occupied by the Italians until Italy's withdrawal from the war in September 1943.

In 1944, Arrondaz was recaptured relatively easily on 13 September, along with the other strongpoints around Modane. The Maurienne positions had suffered little damage during the war and by the end of 1944 were partly repaired and placed into service. Immediately after the war, the Maurienne region was regarded as an area of medium priority for restoration and reuse by the military. By the 1950s the positions in the Southeast of France were restored and operational again. However, by 1960, with France's acquisition of nuclear weapons, the cost and effectiveness of the Maginot system was called into question. Between 1964 and 1971 nearly all of the Maginot fortifications were deactivated.

== See also ==
- List of Alpine Line ouvrages

== Bibliography ==
- Allcorn, William. The Maginot Line 1928-45. Oxford: Osprey Publishing, 2003. ISBN 1-84176-646-1
- Kaufmann, J.E. and Kaufmann, H.W. Fortress France: The Maginot Line and French Defenses in World War II, Stackpole Books, 2006. ISBN 0-275-98345-5
- Kaufmann, J.E., Kaufmann, H.W., Jancovič-Potočnik, A. and Lang, P. The Maginot Line: History and Guide, Pen and Sword, 2011. ISBN 978-1-84884-068-3
- Mary, Jean-Yves; Hohnadel, Alain; Sicard, Jacques. Hommes et Ouvrages de la Ligne Maginot, Tome 1. Paris, Histoire & Collections, 2001. ISBN 2-908182-88-2 (in French)
- Mary, Jean-Yves; Hohnadel, Alain; Sicard, Jacques. Hommes et Ouvrages de la Ligne Maginot, Tome 4 - La fortification alpine. Paris, Histoire & Collections, 2009. ISBN 978-2-915239-46-1 (in French)
- Mary, Jean-Yves; Hohnadel, Alain; Sicard, Jacques. Hommes et Ouvrages de la Ligne Maginot, Tome 5. Paris, Histoire & Collections, 2009. ISBN 978-2-35250-127-5 (in French)
