= Ouvrage Pas du Roc =

- Part of Maginot Line, Alpine Line
- Southeast France
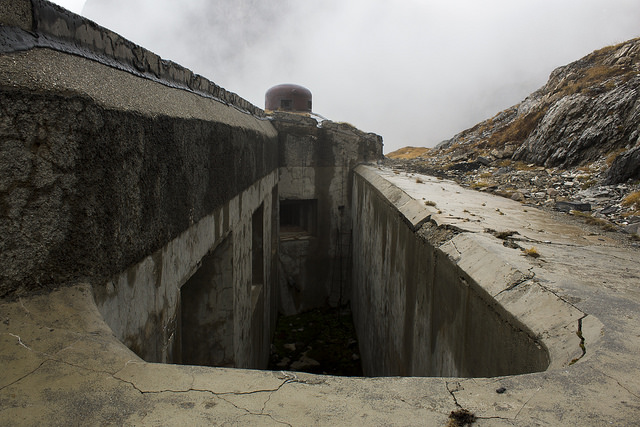

Site information
- Controlled by: France

Location
- Coordinates: 45.1406°N 6.65333°E

Site history
- In use: Abandoned
- Materials: Concrete, steel, rock excavation
- Battles/wars: Italian invasion of France

Ouvrage Pas du Roc is a work (gros ouvrage) of the Maginot Line's Alpine extension, the Alpine Line. The ouvrage consists of one entry blocks, one infantry block, two artillery blocks and one observation block 6 kilometres (3.7 mi) south of Modane and 1.6 kilometres (0.99 mi) east of Ouvrage Le Lavoir in the vicinity of the Col de Fréjus. The position was incomplete at the outbreak of war in 1940.

== Description ==
- Block 1 (infantry): One machine gun cloche, one grenade launcher cloche, two heavy twin machine gun cloches and one heavy twin machine gun embrasure.
- Block 2 (observation): One observation cloche.
- Block 3 (artillery): Two 75mm gun embrasures.
- Block 4 (artillery): One machine gun cloche, four 81mm mortar embrasures and one additional embrasure.
- Entrance block: One machine gun cloche (uncompleted), two of four machine gun embrasures completed.
- Aerial tram entry: An additional entry served the position by aerial tram from Pont Nua, not completed.

== History ==
During the Italian invasion of France in 1940, Pas du Roc was the focus of an advance over the Italian border by the Italian Superga Division. On 21 June the cable of the aerial tram was cut by the Italians. Pas-du-Roc opened fire with machine guns and mortars, while the advanced post of Fréjus directed the fire of the ouvrage. On 24 June 1940 the ouvrage was attacked. Supported by its neighbor, petit ouvrage Arrondaz and others, the fort repelled the attack

After the 1940 armistice, Italian forces occupied the Alpine ouvrages and disarmed them. In August 1943, southern France was occupied by the German 19th Army, which took over many of the Alpine positions that had been occupied by the Italians until Italy's withdrawal from the war in September 1943.

In 1944, Pas du Roc was recaptured relatively easily on 13 September, along with the other strongpoints around Modane. The Maurienne positions had suffered little damage during the war and by the end of 1944 were partly repaired and placed into service. Immediately after the war, the Maurienne region was regarded as an area of medium priority for restoration and reuse by the military. By the 1950s the positions in the Southeast of France were restored and operational again. However, by 1960, with France's acquisition of nuclear weapons, the cost and effectiveness of the Maginot system was called into question. Between 1964 and 1971 nearly all of the Maginot fortifications were deactivated.

== See also ==
- List of Alpine Line ouvrages

== Bibliography ==
- Allcorn, William. The Maginot Line 1928-45. Oxford: Osprey Publishing, 2003. ISBN 1-84176-646-1
- Kaufmann, J.E. and Kaufmann, H.W. Fortress France: The Maginot Line and French Defenses in World War II, Stackpole Books, 2006. ISBN 0-275-98345-5
- Kaufmann, J.E., Kaufmann, H.W., Jancovič-Potočnik, A. and Lang, P. The Maginot Line: History and Guide, Pen and Sword, 2011. ISBN 978-1-84884-068-3
- Mary, Jean-Yves; Hohnadel, Alain; Sicard, Jacques. Hommes et Ouvrages de la Ligne Maginot, Tome 1. Paris, Histoire & Collections, 2001. ISBN 2-908182-88-2 (in French)
- Mary, Jean-Yves; Hohnadel, Alain; Sicard, Jacques. Hommes et Ouvrages de la Ligne Maginot, Tome 4 - La fortification alpine. Paris, Histoire & Collections, 2009. ISBN 978-2-915239-46-1 (in French)
- Mary, Jean-Yves; Hohnadel, Alain; Sicard, Jacques. Hommes et Ouvrages de la Ligne Maginot, Tome 5. Paris, Histoire & Collections, 2009. ISBN 978-2-35250-127-5 (in French)
