= Aiguille de Scolette =

Mountain in Italy

Pierre Menue
- French: Aiguille de Scolette
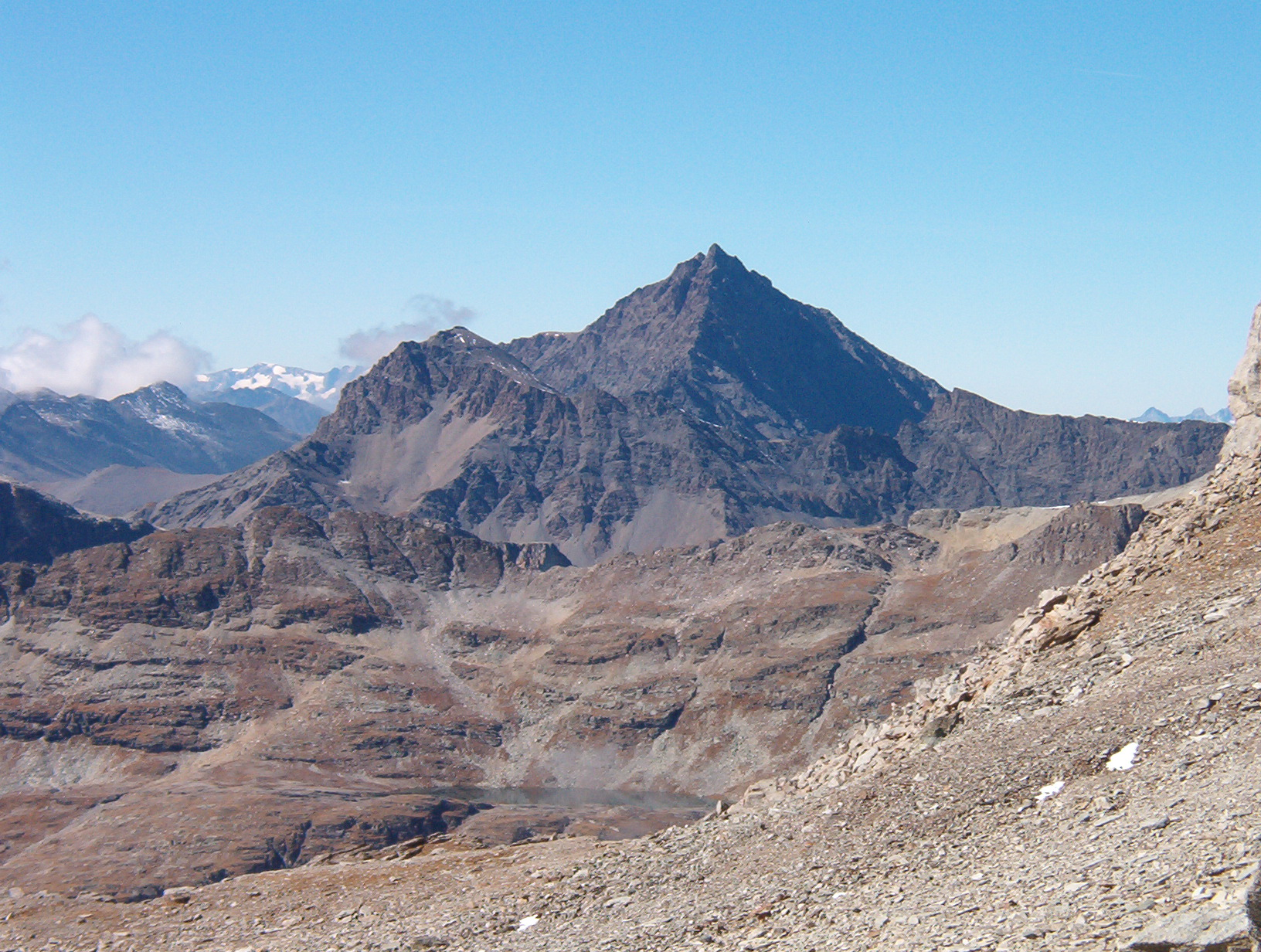

Highest point
- Elevation: 3,506 m (11,503 ft)
- Prominence: 1,069 m (3,507 ft)
- Parent peak: Aiguilles d'Arves
- Isolation: 14.23 km (8.84 mi)
- Listing: Alpine mountains above 3000 m
- Coordinates: 45°09′34″N 06°46′04″E

Geography
- Location within Alps
- Location: Rhône-Alpes, France; Piedmont, Italy
- Parent range: Cottian Alps

Climbing
- First ascent: 1875 by Martino Baretti
- Easiest route: from the Col de Pelouse

Aiguille de Scolette (in French) or Pierre Menue (in Italian) is a mountain of Savoie, France, and of the province of Turin, Italy. It lies in the Cottian Alps and has an elevation of 3,506 metres (11,503 ft) above sea level.

== Geography ==
The mountain is the highest peak of Cottian Alps outside the Monviso area.

In the French subdivision of Western Alps it belongs to the Massif du Mont-Cenis.

Administratively the mountain is divided between the commune of Avrieux (France - north-west and north-east faces) and the comune of Bardonecchia (Italy - southern face).

On its Italian side at 1,979 metres (6,493 ft) above sea level stands the artificial lake of Rochemolles, while on the French side is situated the small lake of Scolette (2,686 metres (8,812 ft)).

== Access to the summit ==
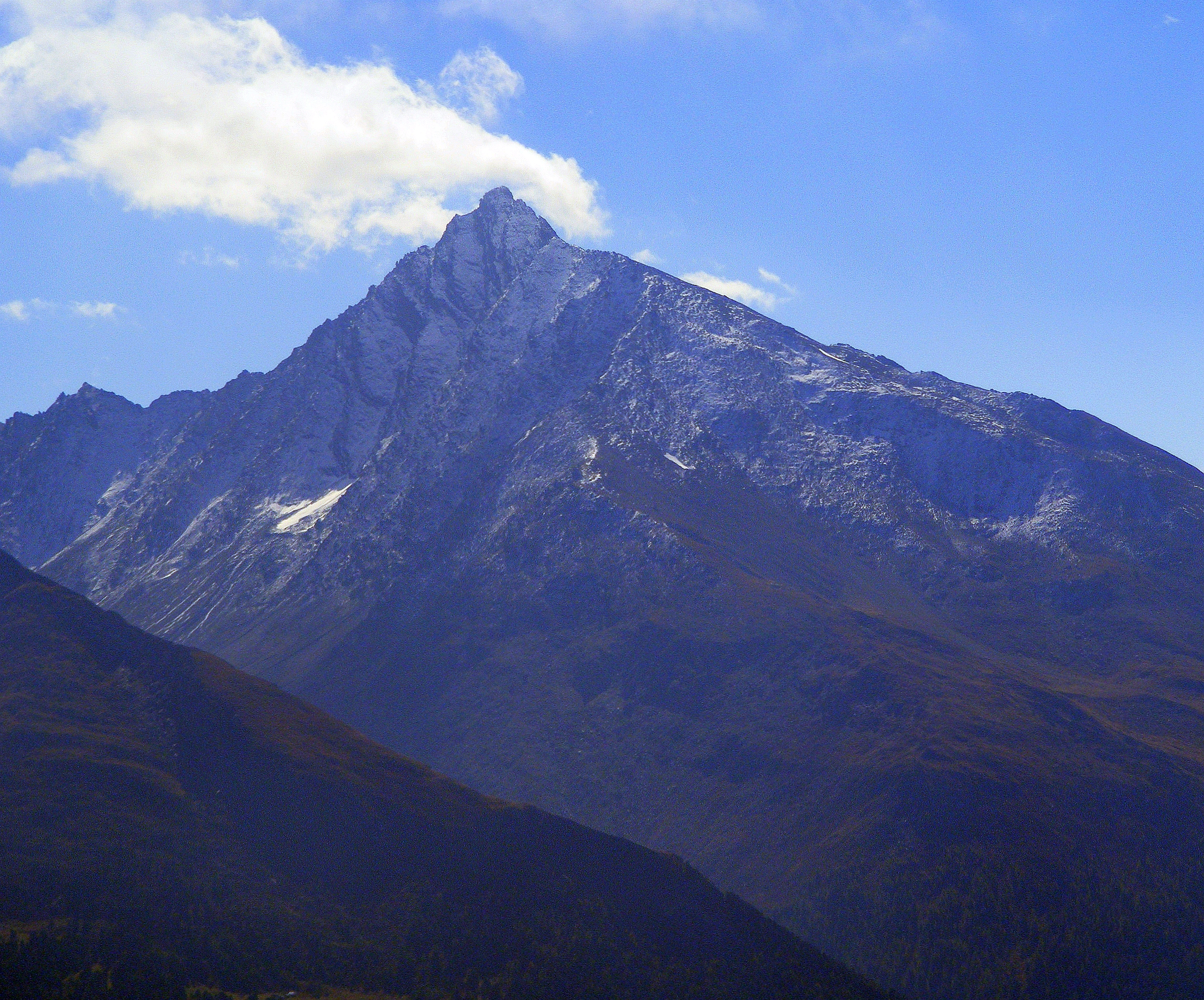
The northern slopes seen from Aussois.

The easiest route for the summit starts from the Col de Pelouse, which connects Avrieux and Bardonecchia, and follows the south-west ridge and then the north-west face of the mountain.

== Maps ==
Media related to Aiguille de Scolette at Wikimedia Commons

- Italian official cartography (Istituto Geografico Militare - IGM); on-line version: www.pcn.minambiente.it
- French official cartography (Institut Géographique National - IGN); on-line version: www.geoportail.fr
- I.G.C. (Istituto Geografico Centrale): Carta dei sentieri e dei rifugi 1:50.000 scale n.1 Valli di Susa Chisone e Germanasca and 1:25.000 scale n.104 Bardonecchia Monte Thabor Sauze d'Oulx
