= Ouvrage Cave-à-Canon =

Fortification on the Alpine extension of the Maginot Line

Coordinates: 45°36′58″N 6°47′11″E

Ouvrage Cave à Canon
- Part of Maginot Line, Alpine Line
- Southeast France
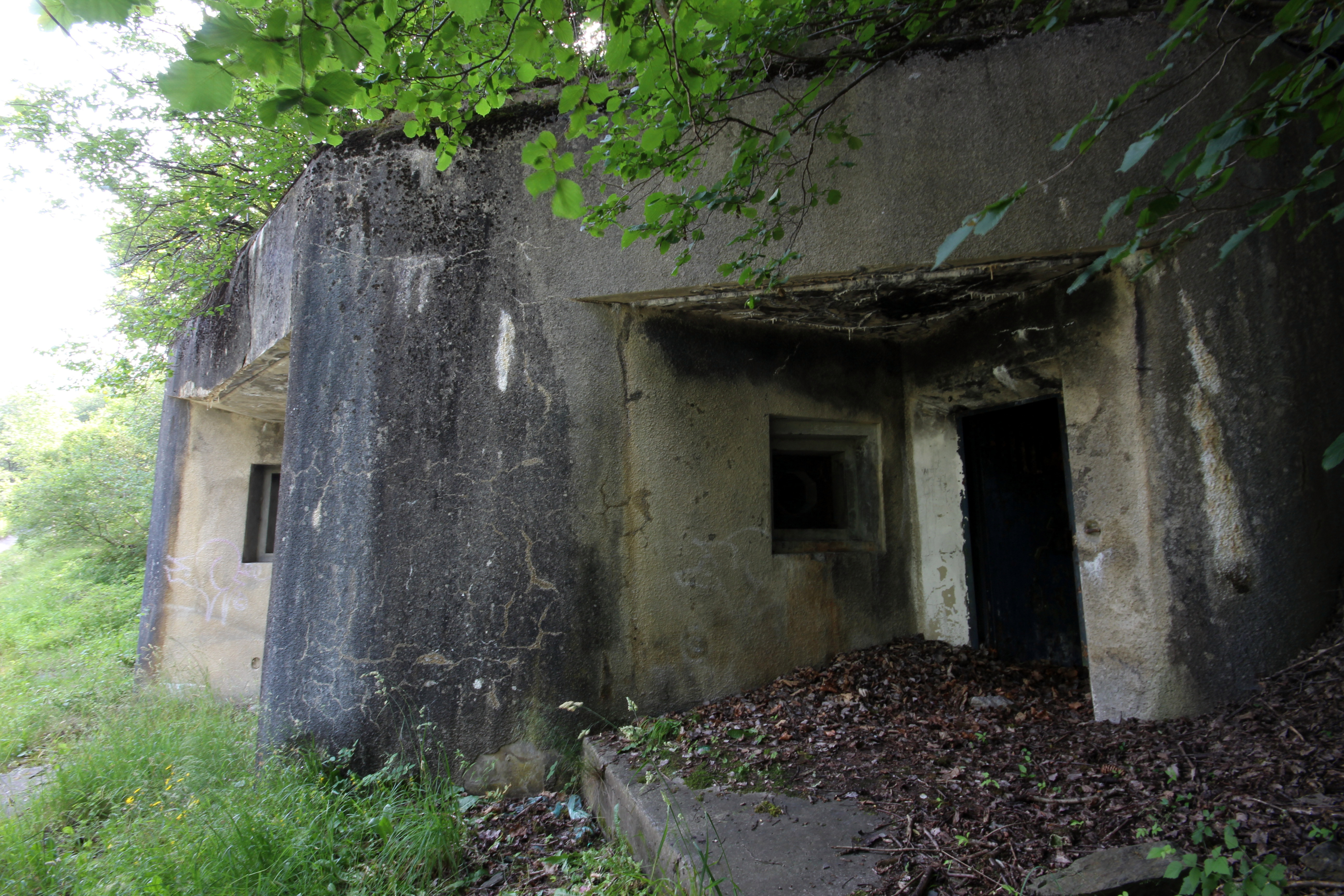

Site information
- Controlled by: France

Site history
- Built: 1937
- Built by: CORF
- In use: Abandoned
- Materials: Concrete, steel, rock excavation
- Battles/wars: Italian invasion of France

Ouvrage Cave-à-Canon is a lesser work (petit ouvrage) of the Maginot Line's Alpine extension, the Alpine Line. Started in 1937, the ouvrage consists of one infantry block about one kilometer east of Bourg St. Maurice, on the south bank of the Isère. A short gallery with cross galleries extends into the rock, with an emergency exit and ventilation shaft halfway back. The ouvrage was incomplete in 1940, under the command of Lieutenant Courteaud.

Cave-à-Canon, and with Ouvrage Chatelard across the valley to the north, and several pre-1914 forts on the heights around Bourg-Saint-Maurice, were placed to block an advance over the Little St Bernard Pass toward Albertville.

== Description ==
- Block 1 (combination): one machine gun turret planned and three machine gun embrasures, three heavy twin machine gun embrasures and one 47mm anti-tank gun embrasure.

The Tarentaise region was liberated by Allied forces in March and April 1945.

== See also ==
- List of Alpine Line ouvrages

== Bibliography ==
- Allcorn, William. The Maginot Line 1928-45. Oxford: Osprey Publishing, 2003. ISBN 1-84176-646-1
- Kaufmann, J.E. and Kaufmann, H.W. Fortress France: The Maginot Line and French Defenses in World War II, Stackpole Books, 2006. ISBN 0-275-98345-5
- Kaufmann, J.E., Kaufmann, H.W., Jancovič-Potočnik, A. and Lang, P. The Maginot Line: History and Guide, Pen and Sword, 2011. ISBN 978-1-84884-068-3
- Mary, Jean-Yves; Hohnadel, Alain; Sicard, Jacques. Hommes et Ouvrages de la Ligne Maginot, Tome 4 - La fortification alpine. Paris, Histoire & Collections, 2009. ISBN 978-2-915239-46-1 (in French)
- Mary, Jean-Yves; Hohnadel, Alain; Sicard, Jacques. Hommes et Ouvrages de la Ligne Maginot, Tome 5. Paris, Histoire & Collections, 2009. ISBN 978-2-35250-127-5 (in French)
