= Ouvrage Le Lavoir =

- Part of Maginot Line, Alpine Line
- Southeast France
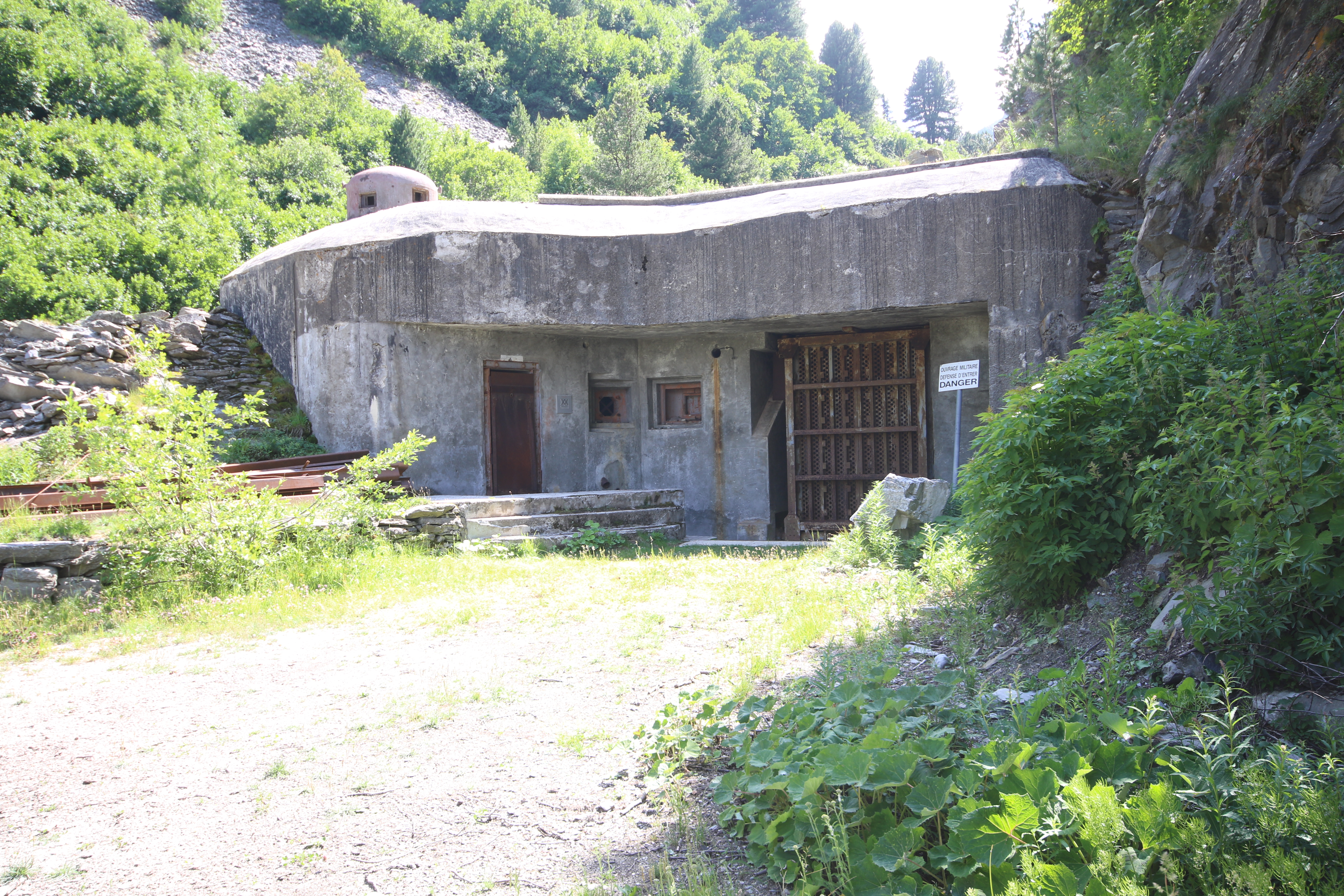

Site information
- Controlled by: France

Location
- Coordinates: 45.15213°N 6.6522°E

Site history
- Built by: CORF
- In use: Abandoned
- Materials: Concrete, steel, rock excavation
- Battles/wars: Italian invasion of France

Ouvrage Le Lavoir Is a work (gros ouvrage) of the Maginot Line's Alpine extension, the Alpine Line, also called the Little Maginot Line. The ouvrage consists of two entry blocks, one infantry block, three artillery blocks and one observation block 6 kilometres (3.7 mi) south of Modane, France, guarding the Col de Fréjus. The surface barracks at Le Lavoir were connected to Charmaix by an aerial tram.

== Description ==
- Block 1 (artillery): one heavy twin machine gun cloche, one anti-tank gun embrasure and two 75mm gun embrasures.
- Block 2 (artillery): two 75mm gun embrasures.
- Block 3 (observation): one observation cloche.
- Block 4 (infantry): one grenade launcher cloche and two heavy twin machine gun embrasures.
- Block 5 (artillery): one machine gun cloche, two 75mm gun embrasures and four 81mm mortar embrasures.
- Block 6 (ventilation): unarmed.
- Personnel entry: three machine gun embrasures.
- Supply entry: one machine gun cloche, one heavy twin machine gun cloche, one heavy twin machine gun embrasure and one anti-tank gun embrasure.

== History ==
The mountains above Le Lavoir were the focus of an Italian invasion attempt during the Italian invasion of France in 1940. On June 20, Le Lavoir and Ouvrage Sapey fired on Italian forces in the vicinity of the advance post of La Roue, right on the border. The next day the Italian Superga Division infiltrated the area around Ouvrage Pas du Roc. Le Lavoir continued to fire on Italian forces through the day. On the 24th, Le Lavoir fired on Italian troops on the surface of Pas-du-Roc. An explosion in an 81mm mortar injured two of Lavoir's gunners. The armistice of June 25 put an end to action. Altogether, Le Lavoir fired 3818 shots, mostly on 24 June, the most of any ouvrage in the Marienne region.

After the 1940 armistice, Italian forces occupied the Alpine ouvrages and disarmed them. In August 1943, southern France was occupied by the German 19th Army, which took over many of the Alpine positions that had been occupied by the Italians until Italy's withdrawal from the war in September 1943.

In 1944, Le Lavoir was recaptured relatively easily on 13 September, along with the other strongpoints around Modane. The Maurienne positions had suffered little damage during the war and by the end of 1944 were partly repaired and placed into service. Immediately after the war, the Maurienne region was regarded as an area of medium priority for restoration and reuse by the military. By the 1950s the positions in the Southeast of France were restored and operational again. However, by 1960, with France's acquisition of nuclear weapons, the cost and effectiveness of the Maginot system was called into question. Between 1964 and 1971 nearly all of the Maginot fortifications were deactivated.

== See also ==
- List of Alpine Line ouvrages

== Bibliography ==
- Allcorn, William. The Maginot Line 1928-45. Oxford: Osprey Publishing, 2003. ISBN 1-84176-646-1
- Kaufmann, J.E. and Kaufmann, H.W. Fortress France: The Maginot Line and French Defenses in World War II, Stackpole Books, 2006. ISBN 0-275-98345-5
- Kaufmann, J.E., Kaufmann, H.W., Jancovič-Potočnik, A. and Lang, P. The Maginot Line: History and Guide, Pen and Sword, 2011. ISBN 978-1-84884-068-3
- Mary, Jean-Yves; Hohnadel, Alain; Sicard, Jacques. Hommes et Ouvrages de la Ligne Maginot, Tome 1. Paris, Histoire & Collections, 2001. ISBN 2-908182-88-2 (in French)
- Mary, Jean-Yves; Hohnadel, Alain; Sicard, Jacques. Hommes et Ouvrages de la Ligne Maginot, Tome 4 - La fortification alpine. Paris, Histoire & Collections, 2009. ISBN 978-2-915239-46-1 (in French)
- Mary, Jean-Yves; Hohnadel, Alain; Sicard, Jacques. Hommes et Ouvrages de la Ligne Maginot, Tome 5. Paris, Histoire & Collections, 2009. ISBN 978-2-35250-127-5 (in French)
