= Ouvrage Chatelard =

- Part of Maginot Line, Alpine Line
- Southeast France
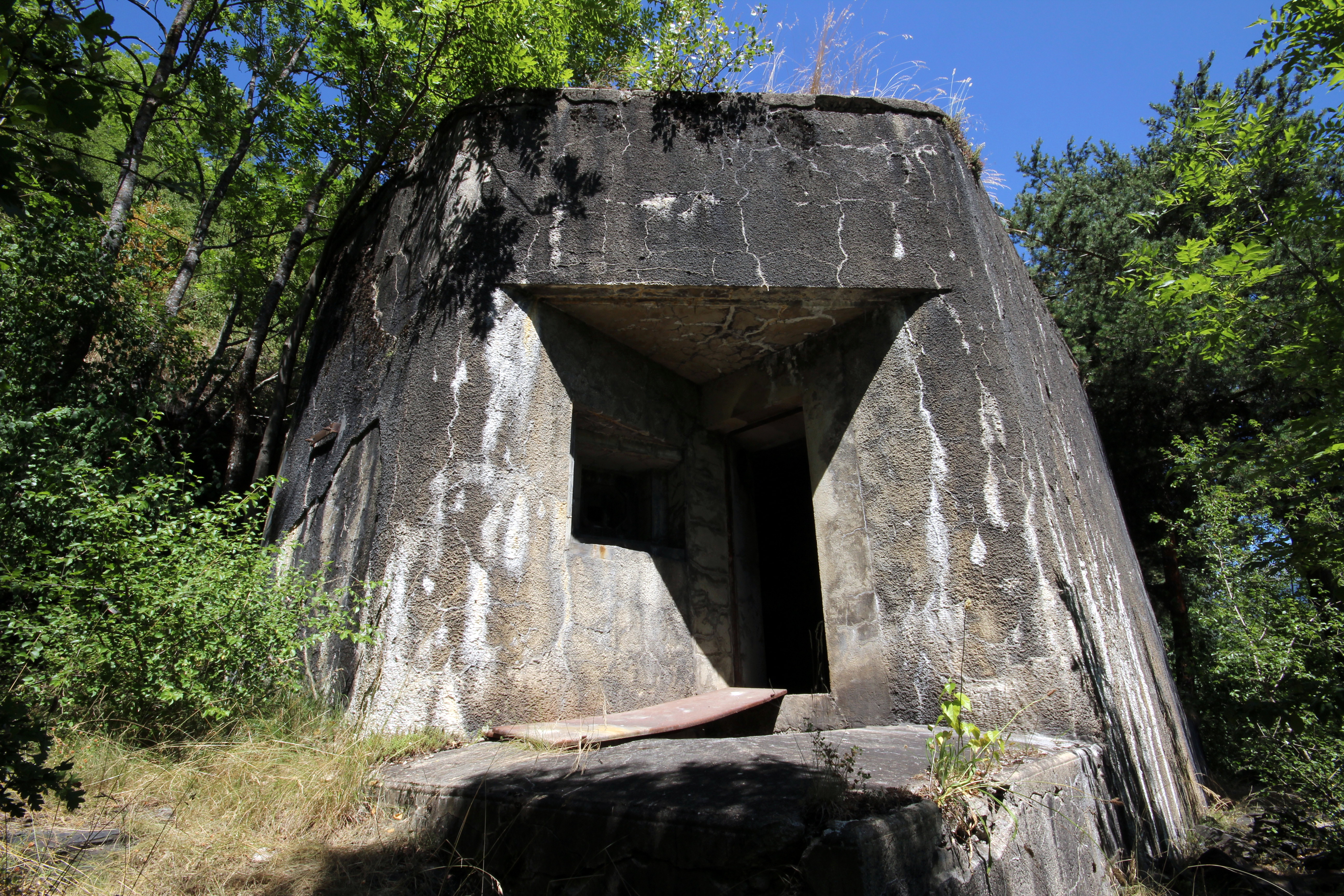

Site information
- Controlled by: France

Location
- Coordinates: 45.62781°N 6.78318°E

Site history
- Built: 1938
- Built by: CORF
- In use: Converted to other use
- Materials: Concrete, steel, rock excavation
- Battles/wars: Italian invasion of France

Ouvrage Chatelard is a lesser work (petit ouvrage) of the Maginot Line's Alpine extension, the Alpine Line, also known as the Little Maginot Line. Begun in 1938, the ouvrage consists of one infantry block about one kilometer northeast of Bourg St. Maurice, in the village of Le Chatelard. A short gallery with cross galleries extends into the rock, with an emergency exit and ventilation shaft halfway back. The ouvrage was incomplete in 1940, under the command of Sub-Lieutenant Bochaton.

Chatelard, along with Ouvrage Cave-à-Canon and several pre-1914 forts on the heights around Bourg-Saint-Maurice, were placed to block an advance over the Little St Bernard Pass toward Albertville.

== Description ==
- Block 1 (combination): one machine gun turret planned and two machine gun embrasures, three heavy twin machine gun embrasures and one 47mm anti-tank gun embrasure.

An additional block was planned with a machine gun turret, not completed.

The position presently serves as a dog shelter.

== Blockhaus de Versoyen ==
The Blockhaus de Versoyen is just to the east of Chatelard, positioned to block a bridge and RN90. It was provided with an anti-tank ditch. The position was held by 13 men and was armed with one heavy twin machine gun/47mm anti-tank gun combination covering the road, and one heavy machine gun/25mm anti-tank gun combination covering the valley.

On 23 June 1940 an Italian patrol approached the Versoyen blockhouse and was fired upon by Chatelard. On 25 June another patrol approached and opened fire. The blockhouse returned fire, killing or wounding three Italians.

The Tarentaise region was liberated by Allied forces in March and April 1945.

== See also ==
- List of Alpine Line ouvrages

== Bibliography ==
- Allcorn, William. The Maginot Line 1928-45. Oxford: Osprey Publishing, 2003. ISBN 1-84176-646-1
- Kaufmann, J.E. and Kaufmann, H.W. Fortress France: The Maginot Line and French Defenses in World War II, Stackpole Books, 2006. ISBN 0-275-98345-5
- Kaufmann, J.E., Kaufmann, H.W., Jancovič-Potočnik, A. and Lang, P. The Maginot Line: History and Guide, Pen and Sword, 2011. ISBN 978-1-84884-068-3
- Mary, Jean-Yves; Hohnadel, Alain; Sicard, Jacques. Hommes et Ouvrages de la Ligne Maginot, Tome 4 - La fortification alpine. Paris, Histoire & Collections, 2009. ISBN 978-2-915239-46-1 (in French)
- Mary, Jean-Yves; Hohnadel, Alain; Sicard, Jacques. Hommes et Ouvrages de la Ligne Maginot, Tome 5. Paris, Histoire & Collections, 2009. ISBN 978-2-35250-127-5 (in French)
