= Avrieux =

Avrieux Avrou (Savoyard)
- Commune
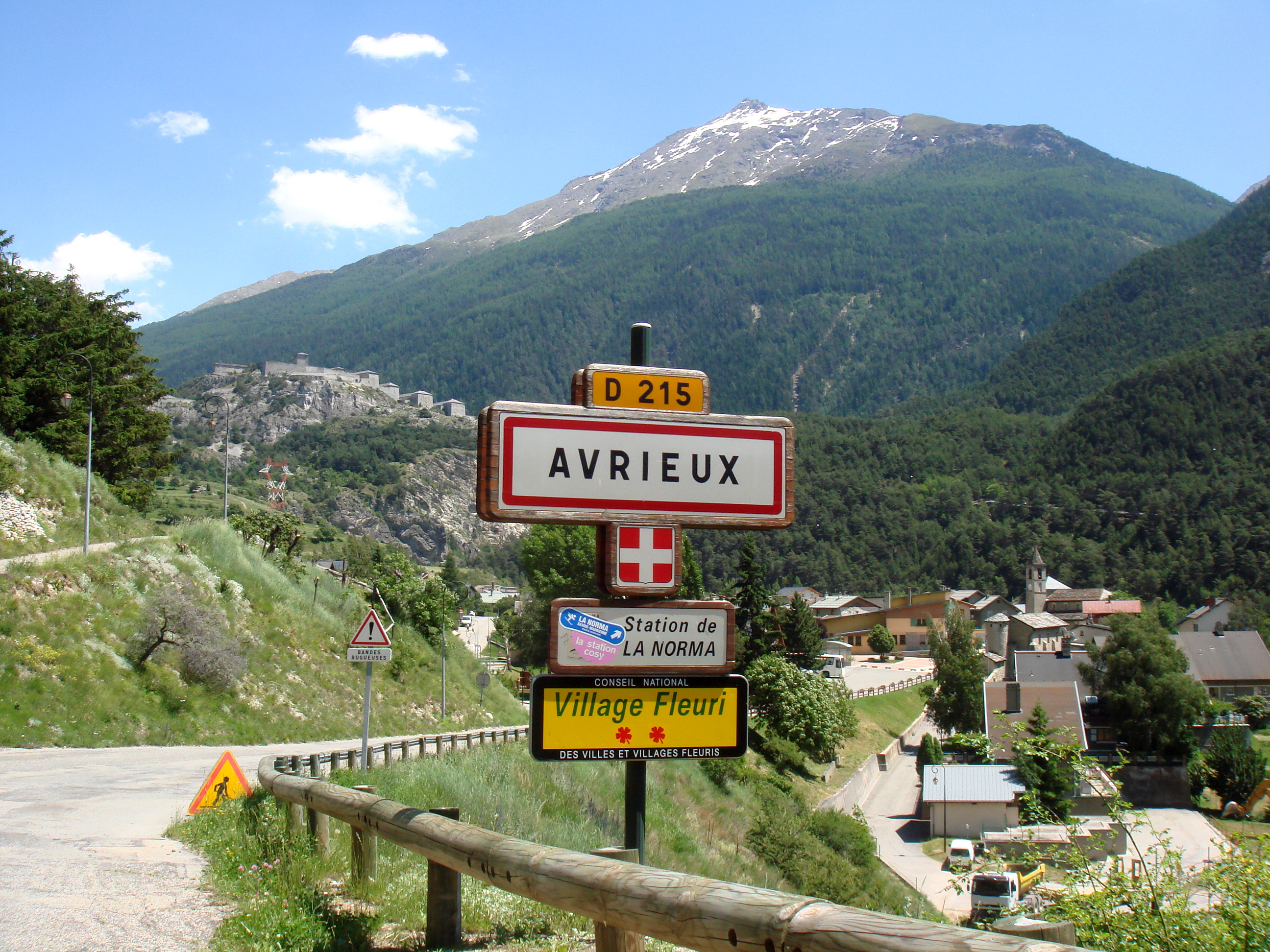
- The road into Avrieux
- Location of Avrieux
- Location within France Location within Auvergne-Rhône-Alpes
- Coordinates: 45°12′55″N 6°43′21″E
- Country: France
- Region: Auvergne-Rhône-Alpes
- Department: Savoie
- Arrondissement: Saint-Jean-de-Maurienne
- Canton: Modane
- Intercommunality: CC Haute Maurienne Vanoise

Government
  - Mayor (2020–2026): Jean-Marc Buttard
- Area^{1}: 37.85 km^{2} (14.61 sq mi)
- Highest elevation: 3,506 m (11,503 ft)
- Lowest elevation: 1,094 m (3,589 ft)
- Population (2023): 386
  - Density: 10.2/km^{2} (26.4/sq mi)
- Demonym: Avrionlins / Avrionlines
- Time zone: UTC+01:00 (CET)
  - Summer (DST): UTC+02:00 (CEST)
- INSEE/Postal code: 73026 /73500
- Website: www.avrieux.com
- ^{1} French Land Register data, which excludes lakes, ponds, glaciers > 1 km^{2} (0.386 sq mi or 247 acres) and river estuaries.

Avrieux (Savoyard: Avrou) is a commune in the Savoie department in the Auvergne-Rhône-Alpes region in south-eastern France.

== Climate ==
Avrieux has a humid continental climate (Köppen climate classification Dfb). The average annual temperature in Avrieux is 8.5 °C (47.3 °F). The average annual rainfall is 600.4 mm (23.64 in) with November as the wettest month. The temperatures are highest on average in July, at around 18.0 °C (64.4 °F), and lowest in January, at around −0.9 °C (30.4 °F). The highest temperature ever recorded in Avrieux was 36.0 °C (96.8 °F) on 19 July 2023; the coldest temperature ever recorded was −21.6 °C (−6.9 °F) on 9 January 1985.

Climate data for Avrieux (1991−2020 normals, extremes 1948−present)
Month	Jan	Feb	Mar	Apr	May	Jun	Jul	Aug	Sep	Oct	Nov	Dec	Year
Record high °C (°F)	14.4 (57.9)	20.1 (68.2)	23.0 (73.4)	26.5 (79.7)	30.5 (86.9)	35.0 (95.0)	36.0 (96.8)	35.0 (95.0)	30.5 (86.9)	27.8 (82.0)	21.6 (70.9)	15.8 (60.4)	36.0 (96.8)
Mean daily maximum °C (°F)	2.8 (37.0)	5.1 (41.2)	10.1 (50.2)	13.6 (56.5)	18.0 (64.4)	22.1 (71.8)	24.5 (76.1)	24.1 (75.4)	19.4 (66.9)	14.7 (58.5)	7.6 (45.7)	2.5 (36.5)	13.7 (56.7)
Daily mean °C (°F)	−0.9 (30.4)	0.3 (32.5)	4.6 (40.3)	7.9 (46.2)	12.1 (53.8)	15.9 (60.6)	18.0 (64.4)	17.7 (63.9)	13.7 (56.7)	9.4 (48.9)	3.6 (38.5)	−0.6 (30.9)	8.5 (47.3)
Mean daily minimum °C (°F)	−4.7 (23.5)	−4.4 (24.1)	−0.8 (30.6)	2.2 (36.0)	6.3 (43.3)	9.7 (49.5)	11.5 (52.7)	11.3 (52.3)	7.9 (46.2)	4.1 (39.4)	−0.5 (31.1)	−3.7 (25.3)	3.2 (37.8)
Record low °C (°F)	−21.6 (−6.9)	−21.1 (−6.0)	−18.4 (−1.1)	−9.3 (15.3)	−4.1 (24.6)	−0.5 (31.1)	1.8 (35.2)	1.3 (34.3)	−2.0 (28.4)	−7.8 (18.0)	−15.6 (3.9)	−18.4 (−1.1)	−21.6 (−6.9)
Average precipitation mm (inches)	54.1 (2.13)	36.0 (1.42)	36.6 (1.44)	39.9 (1.57)	57.4 (2.26)	53.5 (2.11)	39.8 (1.57)	50.7 (2.00)	47.5 (1.87)	60.4 (2.38)	63.2 (2.49)	61.3 (2.41)	600.4 (23.64)
Average precipitation days (≥ 1.0 mm)	7.9	7.0	6.9	7.3	9.8	9.1	7.5	8.4	7.5	7.3	8.8	8.7	96.2
Source: Météo-France

== Twin towns ==
Avrieux is twinned with Piedicavallo, Italy (2009).

== See also ==
- Communes of the Savoie department
