= Col du Fréjus =

High road in the Cottian Alps between France and Italy

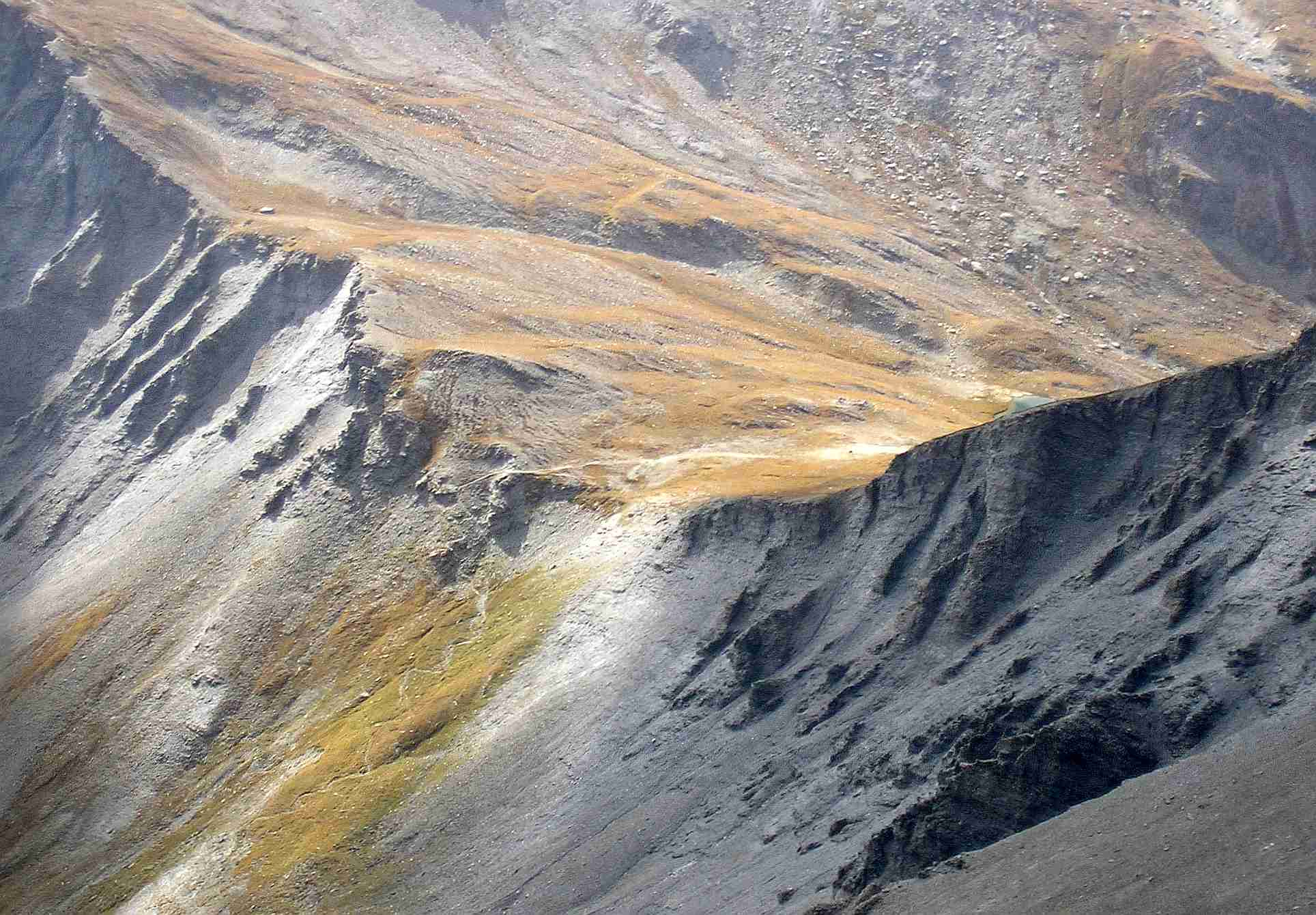

- Location within Alps
- Elevation: 2,539 metres (8,330 ft)
- Traversed by: dirt road and bridle path

Third Approach
- Location: Savoie, France / Province of Turin, Italy
- Range: Cottian Alps
- Coordinates: 45°07′50″N 6°40′27″E

Col du Fréjus (el. 2,542 metres) is a mountain col path in the Cottian Alps on the border between France and Italy.

== See also ==
- List of highest paved roads in Europe
- List of mountain passes
