= Biella Cathedral =

Cathedral in Biella, Italy

Coordinates: 45°33′58″N 08°03′12″E

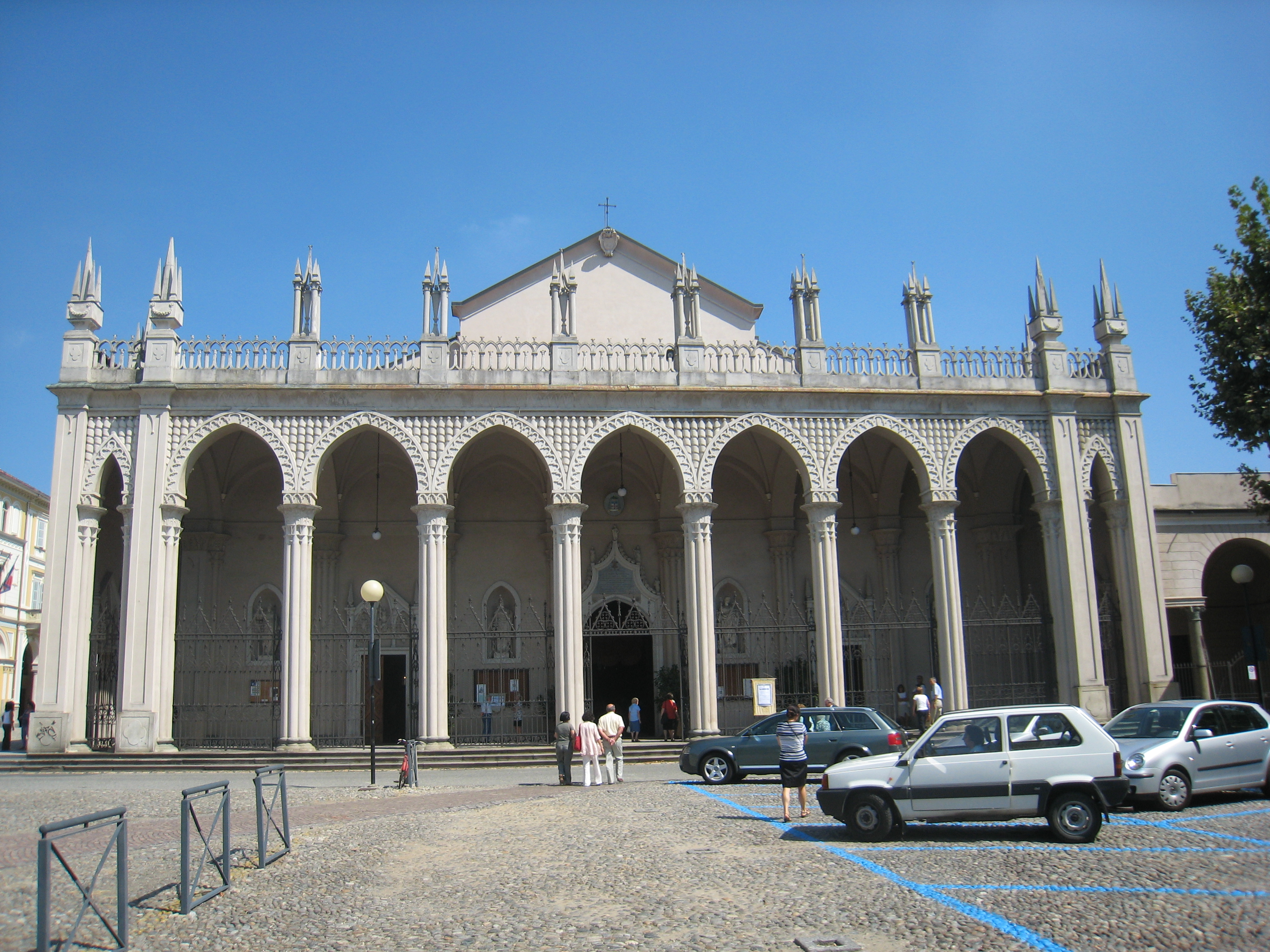
West front of the cathedral

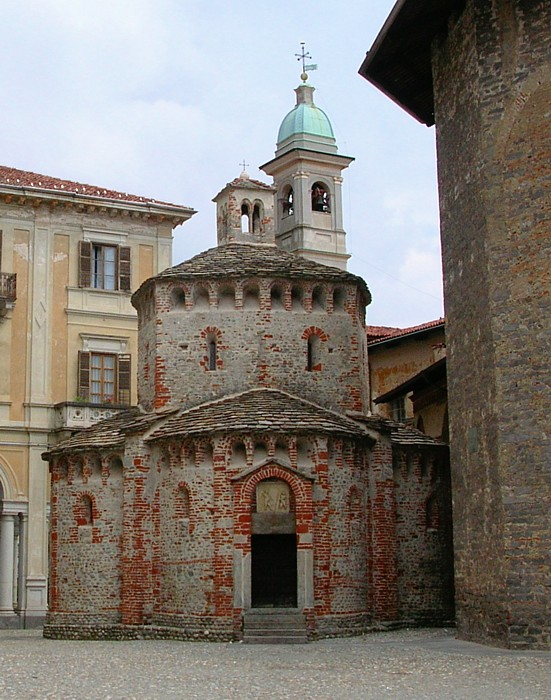
Battistero di San Giovanni Battista

Biella Cathedral (Italian: Duomo di Biella; Cattedrale di Santo Stefano) is a Roman Catholic cathedral in Biella, Piedmont, Italy, dedicated to Saint Stephen. It is the episcopal seat of the Diocese of Biella. The current church was built over an 11th-century Romanesque church called the Church of Santa Maria al Piano. Construction started in 1402 by master mason Giovanni Borri and continued until 1404 as an expression of a vow the people had made to the Madonna of Oropa for saving them from the plague of 1399.

The church was elevated to a cathedral in 1772, prompting a second phase of radical changes to the church that added its current Neo-Gothic elements, which were largely financed by the House of Savoy. This phase of construction was initiated under the orders of Charles Emmanuel III, who entrusted the project to Turinese architect Ignazio Giulio. Giulio drew up a plan to build the chapels, side aisles, sacristy, chapter house and crypt, and to expand the transepts. Many paintings in the church such as those by Pietro Fea, Francesco Gonin and Luigi Vacca were painted during this time. Giovanni Battista Canaveri consecrated the church on 16 June 1804.

Nicola Martiniano Tarino took over the position of superintendent for the cathedral site after the death of Giulio in 1817. Tarino planned to lengthen the nave and two aisles and build a Neo-Gothic façade and porch. The Biellese architect Felice Marandono was appointed to draw up the designs for the façade. The neighbouring Church of Santo Stefano was demolished in 1873 to make way for a home for the parish priest. Only the Gothic bell tower survived and it became the cathedral's campanile. An old baptistery dedicated to St. John the Baptist stands next to the cathedral, it is likely a remnant of the 11th-century Romanesque church.

== See also ==
- Catholic Church in Italy
