= Diocese of Biella =

Roman Catholic diocese in Italy

Coordinates: 45.5667°N 8.0667°E

Diocese of Biella Dioecesis Bugellensis

Catholic
- Biella Cathedral

Location
- Country: Italy
- Ecclesiastical province: Vercelli

Statistics
- Area: 900 km^{2} (350 sq mi)
- Population: Total; Catholics: (as of 2022); 167,664 ▼; 158,682 ▼
- Parishes: 114

Information
- Denomination: Catholic Church
- Rite: Roman Rite
- Established: 1 June 1772
- Cathedral: Cattedrale di S. Stefano
- Secular priests: 99 (diocesan) ▼27 (religious Orders) ▲29 Permanent Deacons ▲

Current leadership
- Pope: Leo XIV
- Bishop: Roberto Farinella
- Vicar General: Paolo Boffa Sandalina
- Bishops emeritus: Gabriele Mana

Map

Website
- www.diocesi.biella.it

The Diocese of Biella (Latin: Dioecesis Bugellensis) is a Latin diocese of the Catholic Church in northern Italy, in the Piedmont region. The diocese was established in 1772. It is a suffragan of the Archdiocese of Vercelli. Biella is a city in Piedmont, 42 km (25 mi) northwest of Vercelli.

== History ==
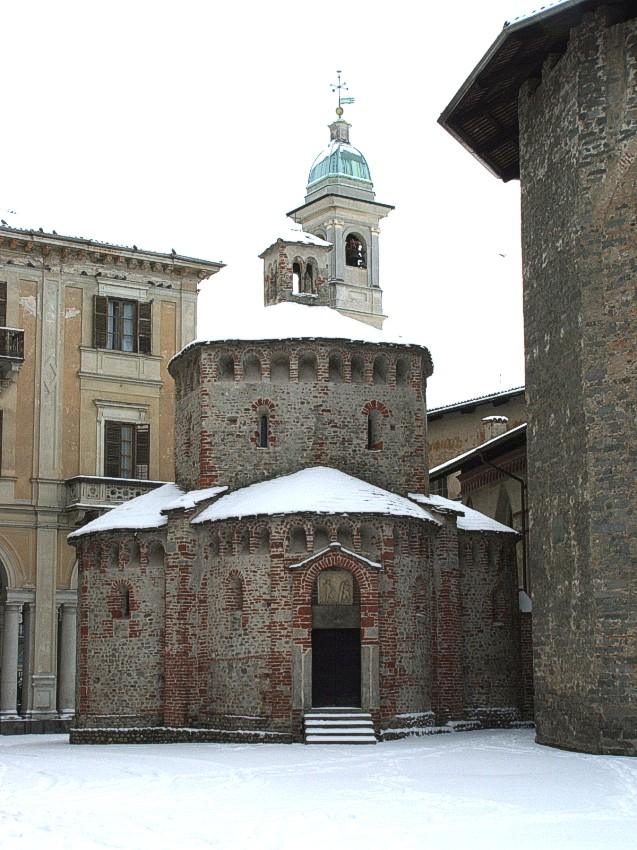
The baptistery of Biella.

From 1160, Biella was a fief, belonging to the bishops of Vercelli. In 1379, Bishop Giovanni Fieschi (1349–1379) of Vercelli was driven out, as a supporter of Urban VI, and Biella came under the control of Amadeus VI, Count of Savoy. Until 1772, the town of Biella was under the ecclesiastical jurisdiction of the Archdiocese of Vercelli. In that year Pope Clement XI, at the request of Charles Emmanuel III of Sardinia, established the Diocese of Biella by the papal bull Praecipua.

The first bishop was Giulio Cesare Viancini, formerly Archbishop of Sassari in Sardinia.

=== Chapter and cathedral ===
Among the religious edifices of the city of Biella, the most notable is the Gothic cathedral, built in 1402. Its beautiful choir is by Galliari. The baptistery, in the form of a small temple, is said to be an ancient Roman edifice. It is in fact a work of the eleventh century, erected on the site of a Roman tomb.

The Chapter of the Cathedral is far older than the Cathedral itself. The Canons of the Collegiate Church of San Stefano appear already in the twelfth century. The Chapter was composed of a Provost, a Treasurer and a Primicerius, among a total of twenty canons. There were also twelve chaplains. In 2023, the Chapter was composed of twelve canons, one of whom was the President.

==== Sanctuary of Oropa ====
In the shrine of Maria Santissima d'Oropa, situated on a mountain near Biella, the diocese preserves a memorial of St. Eusebius of Vercelli, who was banished to the Orient by Emperor Constantius for his defence of Catholicism against Arianism. St. Eusebius, according to tradition, upon his return from the East, is said to have brought three pictures of the Madonna painted on cedar wood, one of which, the image of Oropa, he placed in a small oratory he had built. In the tenth century, the chapel was placed in charge of the Benedictines. When they abandoned the place, Pope Pius II, in 1459, made over the shrine to the Chapter of the Collegiate Church of San Stefano, now the Biella Cathedral, to which it has since belonged. In the sixteenth century, the inhabitants of Biella, in thanksgiving for their deliverance from the plague, built a church over the chapel. In the seventeenth century construction of the devotional complex known as the Sacro Monte di Oropa began.

=== Synods ===
Bishop Bernardino Bollati (1818–1828) held a diocesan synod on 19–21 July 1825. A diocesan synod was held by Bishop Basilio Leto (1873–1885) in 1882. Bishop Carlo Rossi (1936–1972) presided over a diocesan synod in Biella on 24–25 October 1951.

=== Napoleonic Piedmont ===
From 1801 to 1814, Piedmont, and Biella along with it, was annexed to metropolitan France. A French department was established, called Sésia, with its capital at Vercelli. Biella became an "arrondissement" within Sésia.

One of the policies of the French government was the reduction in the number of dioceses both in metropolitan France and in its annexed territories. The French pointed out that there were sixteen dioceses and one metropolitan (Turin) in the Piedmont, of which five were without bishops at the time and three whose bishops had just resigned. They demanded that the sixteen be reduced to eight with one metropolitan. In the bull "Gravissimis Causis" of 1 June 1803, Pope Pius VII authorized the papal legate to First Consul Bonaparte, Cardinal Giovanni Battista Caprara, to suppress a number of dioceses in the ecclesiastical province of Piedmont, including Biella. Caprara carried out his instructions in a decree of 23 January 1805.

After the defeat of Napoleon, the Congress of Vienna agreed to the restoration of the Kingdom of Sardinia. King Victor Emmanuel I of Sardinia invited Pope Pius VII to restore the good order of the Church in his kingdom, which had been disrupted by the French occupation. On 17 July 1817, the pope issued the bull "Beati Petri", which began by establishing de novo the ten dioceses which had been suppressed under the French, including Biella, and delimiting the extent of each in detail, In the same document, the pope also released the diocese of Vercelli from being a suffragan of the metropolitan of Turin, and elevated the diocese to the rank of metropolitan archdiocese. The new metropolitan archdiocese had as suffragans the dioceses of Alessandria, Biella, and Casale.

== Bishops of Biella ==
- Giulio Cesare Viancini (1772 – 1796)
- Giovanni Battista Canaveri, Orat. (1797 – 1805)

Diocese suppressed (1805 – 1817)

- Bernardino Bollati, O.F.M.Observ. (1818 – 1828)
- Placido Maria Tadini (1829 – 1832)
- Giovanni Pietro Losana (6 April 1834 – 14 February 1873 died)
- Basilio Leto (1873 – 1885 resigned)
- Domenico Cumino (1886 – 1901)
- Giuseppe Gamba (1901 – 1906)
- Giovanni Andrea Masera (1906 – 1912)
- Natale Serafino (1912 – 1917)
- Giovanni Garigliano (1917 – 1936)
- Carlo Rossi (7 December 1936 – 15 February 1972 retired)
- Vittorio Piola (15 February 1972 – 15 May 1986 resigned)
- Massimo Giustetti (3 December 1986 – 13 July 2001 retired
- Gabriele Mana (13 July 2001 – 2018 retired)
- Roberto Farinella (27 July 2018 – )

== Sources, and further reading ==
- Benigni, Umberto (1907). "Diocese of Biella" . Catholic Encyclopedia. Vol. 2.
- Bima, Palemone Luigi (1836). Serie cronologica dei romani pontefici e degli arcivescovi e vescovi del Piemonte estratta da accurati autori ed autentici documenti dall'erezione di ciascuna sede sino all'anno corrente [Palemone Luigi] (in Italian). Torino: dalla Stamperia Ghiringhello. p. 112.
- Cappelletti, Giuseppe (1858). Le chiese d'Italia: dalla loro origine sino ai nostri giorni (in Italian). Vol. decimoquarto (XIV). Venice: G. Antonelli. pp. 649–671.
- Gabotto, Ferdinando (1896). "Biella e i vescovi di Vercelli". Archivio Storico Italiano (in Italian). 18: 3–57.
- Gams, Pius Bonifatius (1873). Series episcoporum Ecclesiae catholicae: quotquot innotuerunt a beato Petro apostolo. Ratisbon: Typis et Sumptibus Georgii Josephi Manz. p. 813.
- Mullatera, Giovanni Tommaso (1778). Memorie cronologiche e corografiche della città di Biella. (in Italian). Biella: Cajani, 1778.
- Negro, Flavia (2008). "Scheda storico-territoriale del comune di Biella." [self-published]
- Rando, Cincia, ed. (2002). Biella e provincia. Touring Club Italiano (in Italian). Milano: Touring Editore. ISBN 978-88-365-2570-6.
- Ritzler, Remigius; Sefrin, Pirminus (1958). Hierarchia catholica medii et recentis aevi VI (1730-1799). Patavii: Messagero di S. Antonio. pp. 133–134.
- Ritzler, Remigius; Sefrin, Pirminus (1968). Hierarchia Catholica medii et recentioris aevi (in Latin). Vol. VII (1800–1846). Monasterii: Libreria Regensburgiana.
- Remigius Ritzler; Pirminus Sefrin (1978). Hierarchia catholica Medii et recentioris aevi (in Latin). Vol. VIII (1846–1903). Il Messaggero di S. Antonio.
- Pięta, Zenon (2002). Hierarchia catholica medii et recentioris aevi (in Latin). Vol. IX (1903–1922). Padua: Messagero di San Antonio. ISBN 978-88-250-1000-8.

=== External links ===
- Cheney, David M. (2007), "Diocese of Biella", Catholic-Hierarchy.
