= San Dalmazzo =

San Dalmazzo may refer to:

- San Dalmazzo, Turin, Roman Catholic church in Turin, Italy
- Borgo San Dalmazzo, municipality in the Province of Cuneo in the Italian region Piedmont

== See also ==
- Dalmazzo
