= Menabrea =

Menabrea may refer to:

- Luigi Federico Menabrea (1809–1896), Italian diplomat, general and mathematician who served as Prime Minister in three successive governments
  - First Menabrea government (October 1867 – January 1868)
  - Second Menabrea government (January 1868 – May 1869)
  - Third Menabrea government (May 1869 – December 1869)
- Birra Menabrea, an Italian brewing company
- 27988 Menabrea, a minor planet
