= Forst (brewery) =

Brewing company based in Forst, Algund, South Tyrol, Italy

Coordinates: 46°40′14.89″N 11°9′38.86″E

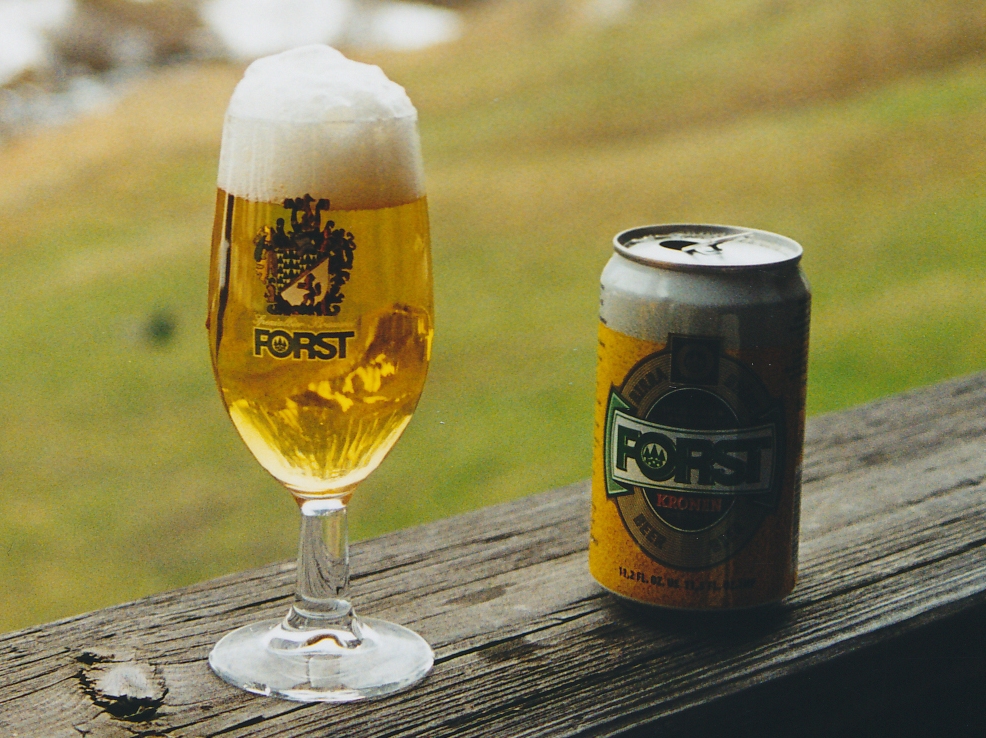
- A FORST Kronen beer (5.2% vol.alc.)
- Location: South Tyrol, Algund
- Opened: 1857, Forst (Algund)
- Annual production volume: 700,000 hectolitres (600,000 US bbl)
- Owned by: Forst AG
- Website: www.Forst.it

Active beers
Name	Type
Forst Luxus Light
Forst Premium
Forst 1857
Forst V.I.P. Pils
Forst Kronen
Forst Sixtus
Forst Heller Bock

Seasonal beers
Name	Type
Forst Osterbier
Forst Christmas Brew

Forst is an Italian brewing company, based in Forst (Italian: Foresta), a frazione (municipal subdivision) of Algund (Italian: Lagundo), South Tyrol. The brewery was founded in 1857 by two entrepreneurs, Johann Wallnöfer and Franz Tappeiner, from Meran (Italian: Merano). Later in 1863, the company passed to the entrepreneur Josef Fuchs, who enlarged the plant in Forst. In 2004, Forst opened a small microbrewery in Forst, Germany.

== Operations ==
Forst has an annual production of 700,000 hl, serving primarily the domestic market. In 1991, it acquired the Menabrea brewery in Biella, Piedmont and also maintains a bottling plant in Palermo, Sicily. The company also produces mineral water, and other non-alcoholic drinks, through a subsidiary named Kaiserwasser.

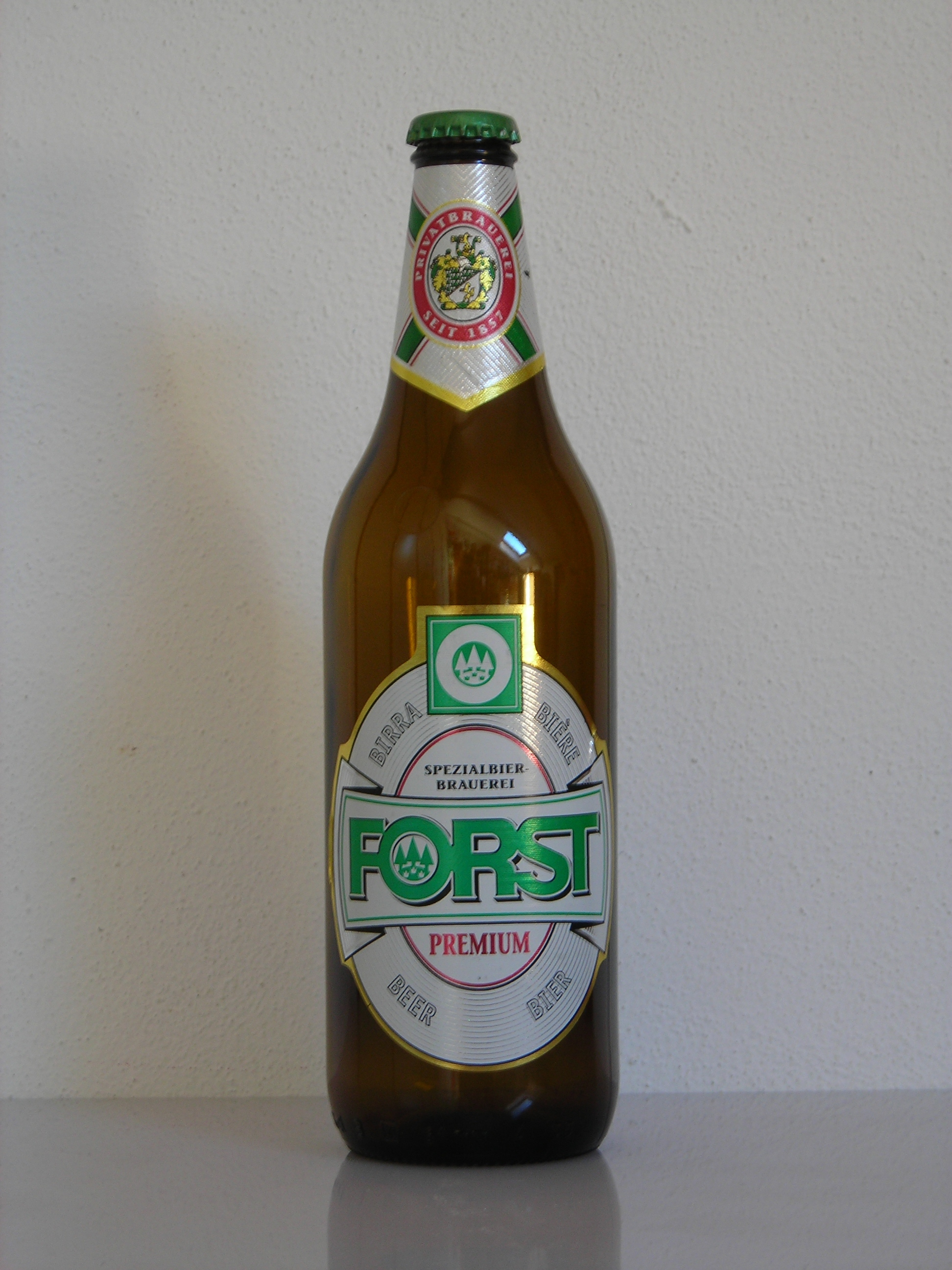
A FORST Premium
4.8% vol.alc.

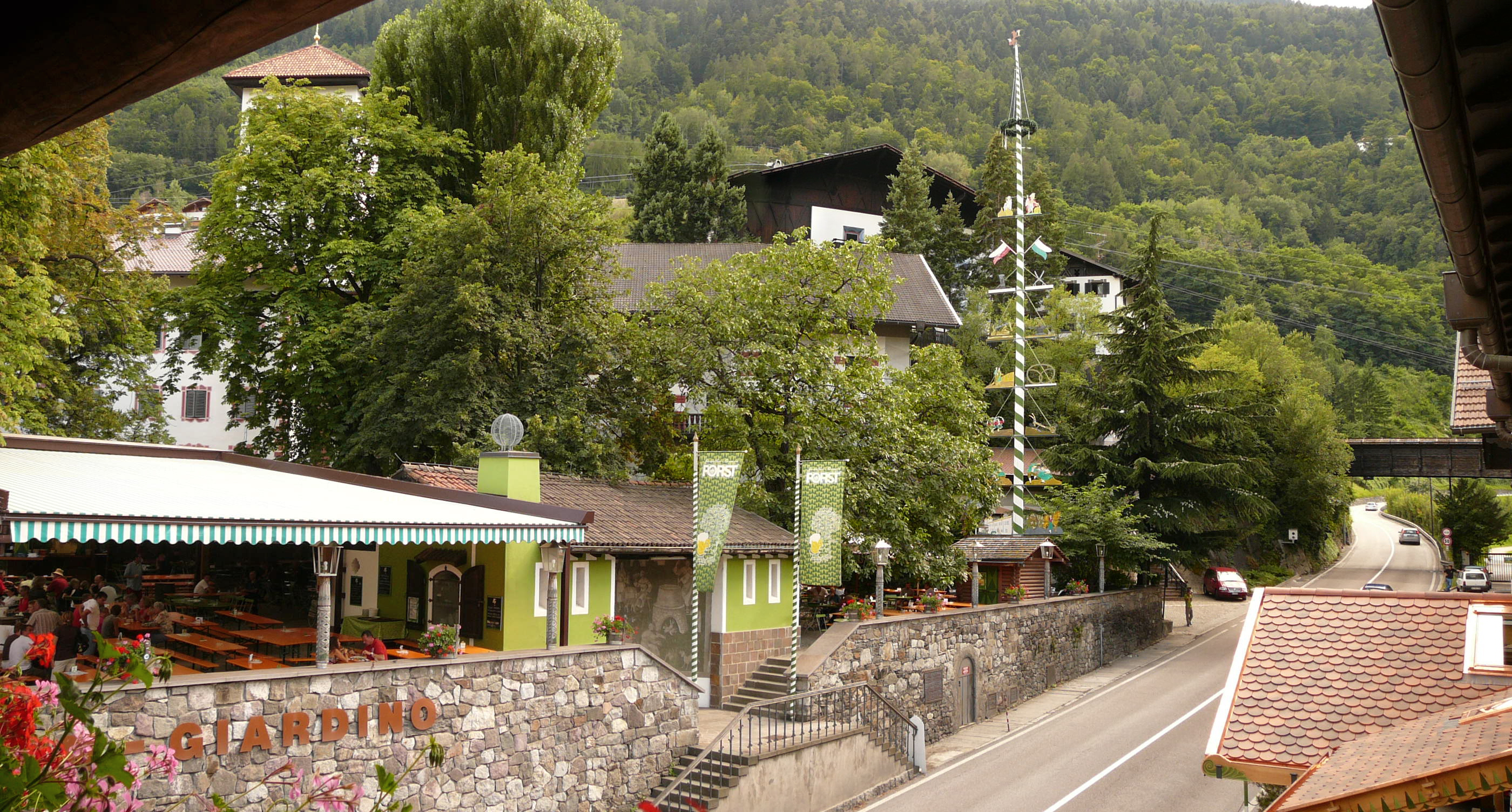
The FORST Biergarten next to the brewery

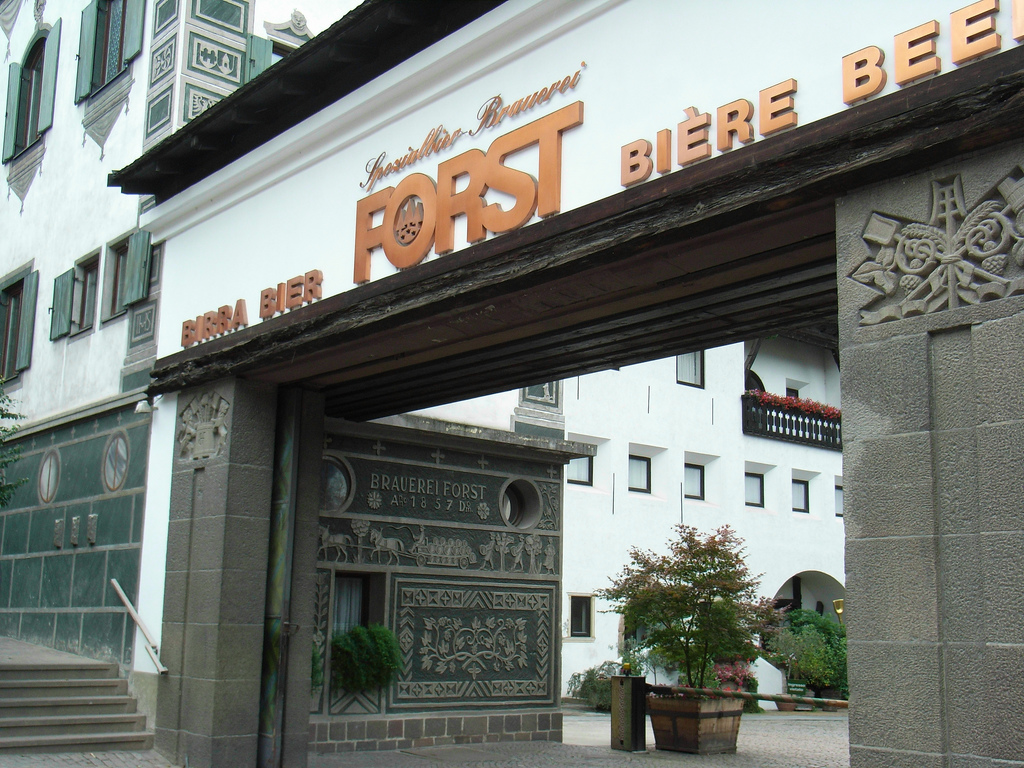
The entrance gate of the brewery at Algund
