= Tommaso Struzzieri =

Most Reverend Tommaso Struzzieri
- Bishop of Todi
- Church: Catholic Church
- Diocese: Diocese of Todi
- In office: 1775–1780
- Predecessor: Francesco Maria Pasini
- Successor: Giovanni Lotrecchi
- Previous posts: Titular Bishop of Tium (1764–1770); Bishop of Ajaccio (1770–1775)

Orders
- Ordination: 1729 by Pietro Francesco Orsini de Gravina
- Consecration: 23 December 1764 by Giulio Cesare Viancini

Personal details
- Born: 30 March 1706 Senigallia, Italy
- Died: 21 January 1780 (age 73) Todi, Italy

Tommaso Struzzieri, C.P. (30 March 1706 – 21 January 1780) was a Roman Catholic prelate who served as Bishop of Todi (1775–1780), Bishop of Amelia (1770–1775), and Titular Bishop of Tium (1764–1770).

== Biography ==
Tommaso Struzzieri was born in Senigallia, Italy on 30 Mar 1706 and ordained a priest in the Congregation of the Passion by Pope Benedict XIII in 1729. On 12 October 1764, he was appointed during the papacy of Pope Clement XIII as Coadjutor Bishop of Ajaccio and Titular Bishop of Tium. On 23 December 1764, he was consecrated bishop by Giulio Cesare Viancini, Archbishop of Sassari. On 10 September 1770, he was appointed during the papacy of Pope Clement XIV as Bishop of Amelia. On 18 December 1775, he was appointed during the papacy of Pope Pius VI as Bishop of Todi. He served as Bishop of Todi until his death on 21 January 1780 .

Catholic Church titles
Preceded by Philipp Wirich Lorenz von Daun zu Sassenheim und Callenborn	Titular Bishop of Tium; 1764–1770	Succeeded by Antonín Bernard Gürtler
Preceded by Giacomo Filippo Consoli	Bishop of Amelia; 1770–1775	Succeeded by Francesco Angelo Jacoboni
Preceded by Francesco Maria Pasini	Bishop of Todi; 1775–1780	Succeeded by Giovanni Lotrecchi
