= Francesco Gonin =

Italian painter

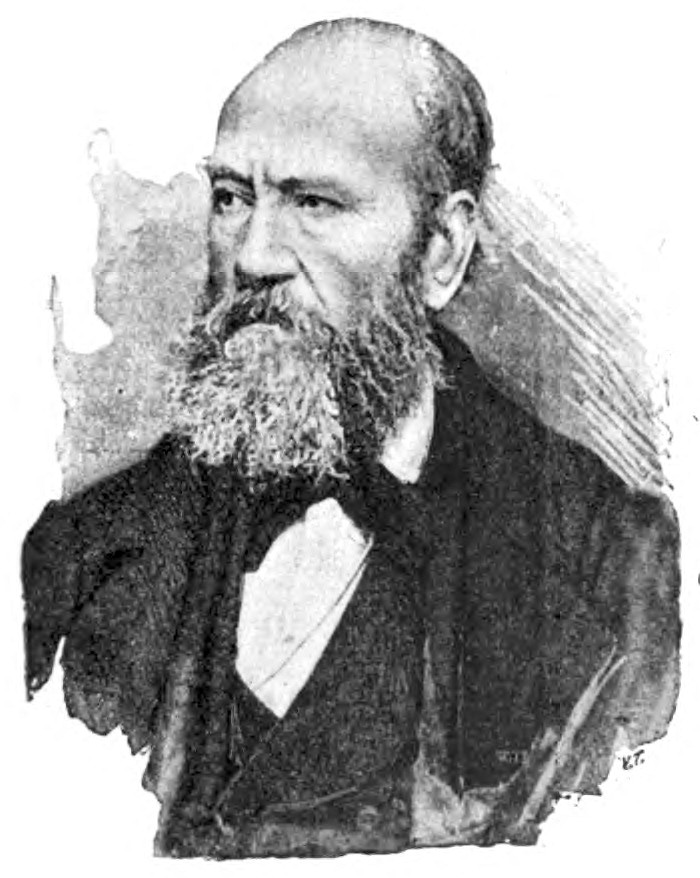
- Francesco Gonin, around 1880
- Born: Francesco Gonin; November 16, 1808; Turin, Kingdom of Piedmont-Sardinia
- Died: September 14, 1889 (aged 80); Giaveno, Piedmont, Kingdom of Italy
- Education: Accademia Albertina
- Known for: Historical paintings, frescoes, illustrations
- Notable work: Illustrations of Alessandro Manzoni's The Betrothed
- Movement: Romanticism

Francesco Gonin (December 16, 1808 – September 14, 1889) was an Italian painter, engraver and scenographer.

== Biography ==
=== Early life ===
Francesco's father Giovanni was of French descent, and his mother Sara Castanier was German. He initially studied under Giovanni Battista Biscarra at the Accademia Albertina. He later learned fresco painting from the scenic designer of the Teatro Regio at Turin, Luigi Vacca, ultimately married Vacca's daughter.

=== Career ===
In 1840 Gonin illustrated the revised and definitive edition of Alessandro Manzoni's I promessi sposi (The Betrothed). He also illustrated a selection of the poetry of Carlo Porta and Tommaso Grossi written in Milanese dialect, Poesie scelte in dialetto milanese di C. Porta e T. Grossi (Milan, 1842), and in these illustrations he revealed a taste for the humble and the picturesque.

From 1840 to 1841, he collaborated with Carlo Bellosio to paint the ballroom and hall at the Royal Palace in Turin. Francesco and Bellosio frescoed for the Castello di Racconigi. In 1844, he decorated the walls and ceiling of the theatre in the city of La Spezia. In 1845, the Carignano of Turin was decorated by Francesco. He spent the next year decorating three churches in Turin: San Massimo, San Dalmazzo, and Santissima Annunziata. He painted the theaters of Asti and Vigevano, the Cathedral of Alessandria, the church Della Sforzesca, and the figures at the waiting hall of the train station of Porta Nuova. He also painted many historical canvases.

=== Later years ===
In 1854 Gonin succeeded Vacca as stage designer at the Teatro Regio in Turin. His most famous piece was the large curtain depicting the Triumph of Venus, of which the sketch still exists (1854; Turin Civic Gallery of Modern and Contemporary Art). He was also a painter of historical, genre and religious subjects as well as landscapes and portraits. Some of his works are held in the Galleria di Palazzo Bianco in Genoa and in the Galleria Nazionale d'Arte Moderna in Rome.

== Select works ==
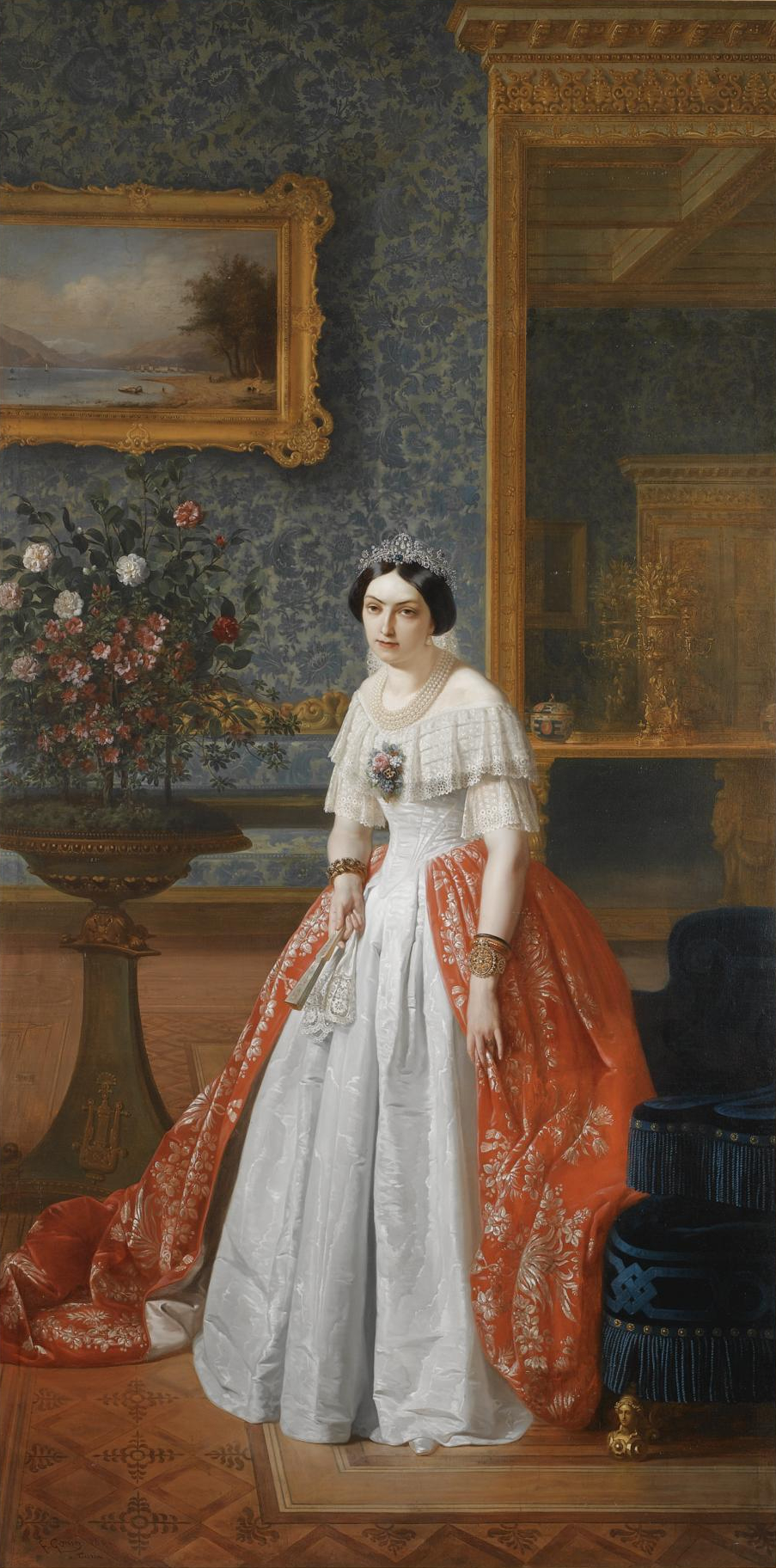
Portrait of Adelaide of Austria

- La Rocca di Sapay presso Viu (Roccia con pascolo) (1850)
- Defense of the body of Patroclos (1842)
- Duel of Achilles and Hector (1842)
- Battle of Mobaldone (1842)
- Surrender of the citadel to the French (1843)
- Mossa sulle coste della Bretagna (1844)
- Return in family (1846)
- Portrait of Massimo d'Azeglio, c. 1850
- Sack of Rome (1853)
- Death of Duke of Savoy Charles Emanuele II (1857)
- Columbus in Jail (1858)
- The forbidden book i daiansati (1859)
- Night Verse (1862)
- Interesting Visit (1867)
- The Guide (1867)
- Madonna (1879)
- Still-life (1872)
- After Meal of family (1873)
- Gran Telone del Teatro Reggio (1881)
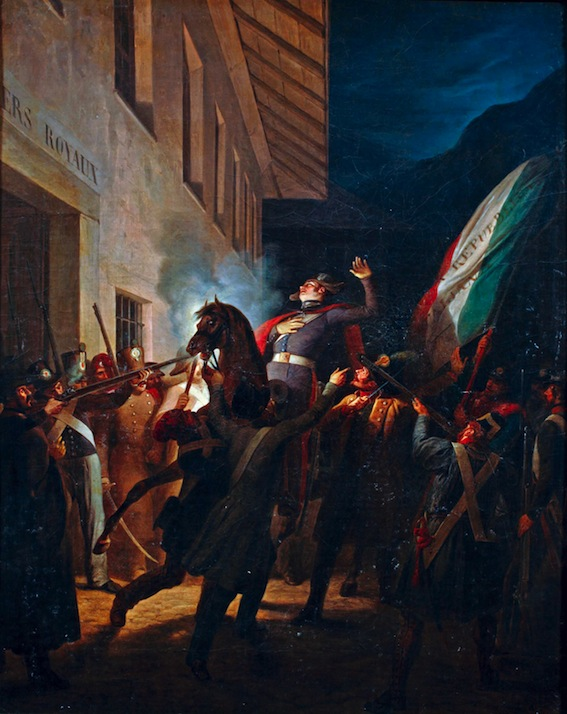
The death of Giovanni Battista Scapaccino, Rome, Museo storico dell'Arma dei Carabinieri

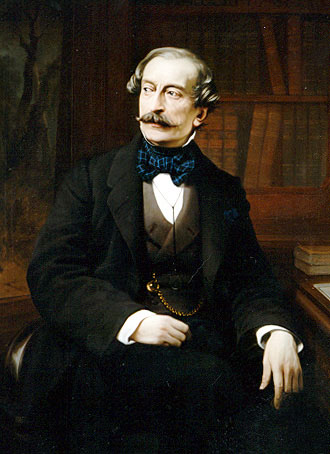
Portrait of Massimo d'Azeglio, Museum of the Risorgimento, Turin

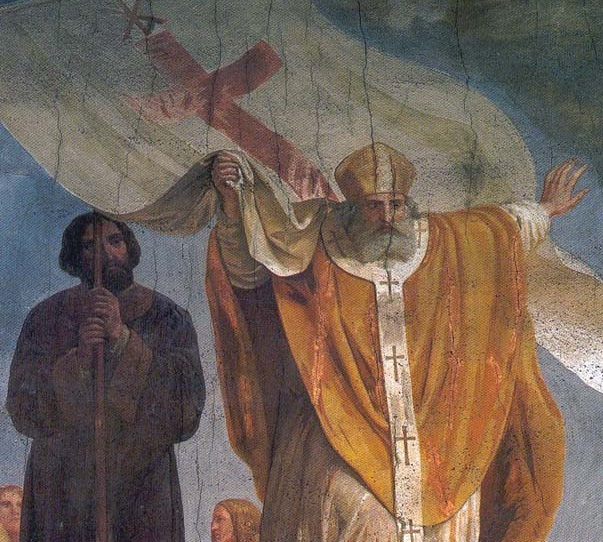
Maximus of Turin, fresco in the Church of St. Maximus, Turin

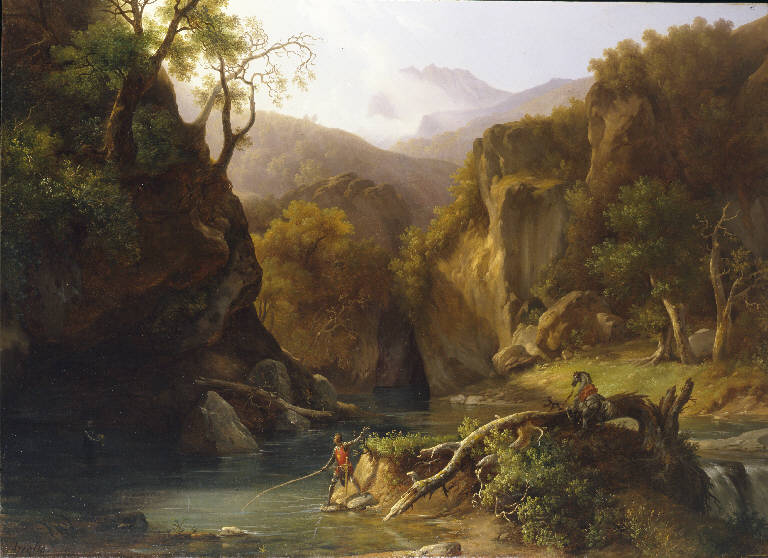
Il Ferraù che vuol ripescare l'elmo, c. 1839, Accademia di Belle Arti di Brera, Milan

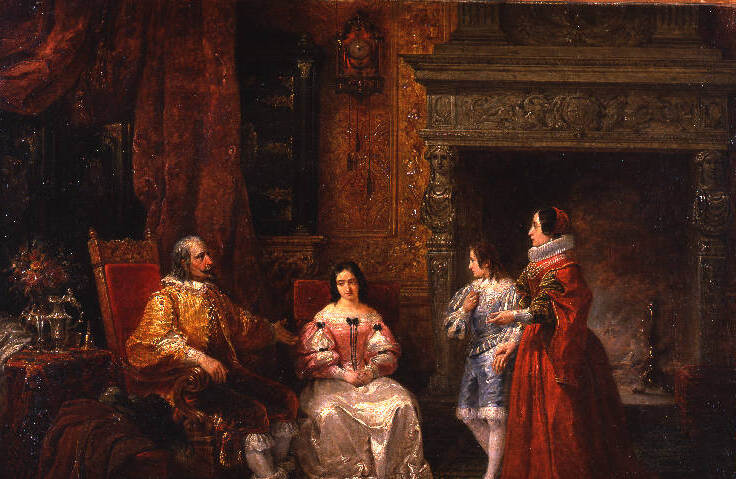
Geltrude pronta a entrare in monastero, 1834, Accademia di Belle Arti di Brera, Milan
