= Cossila =

- Frazione
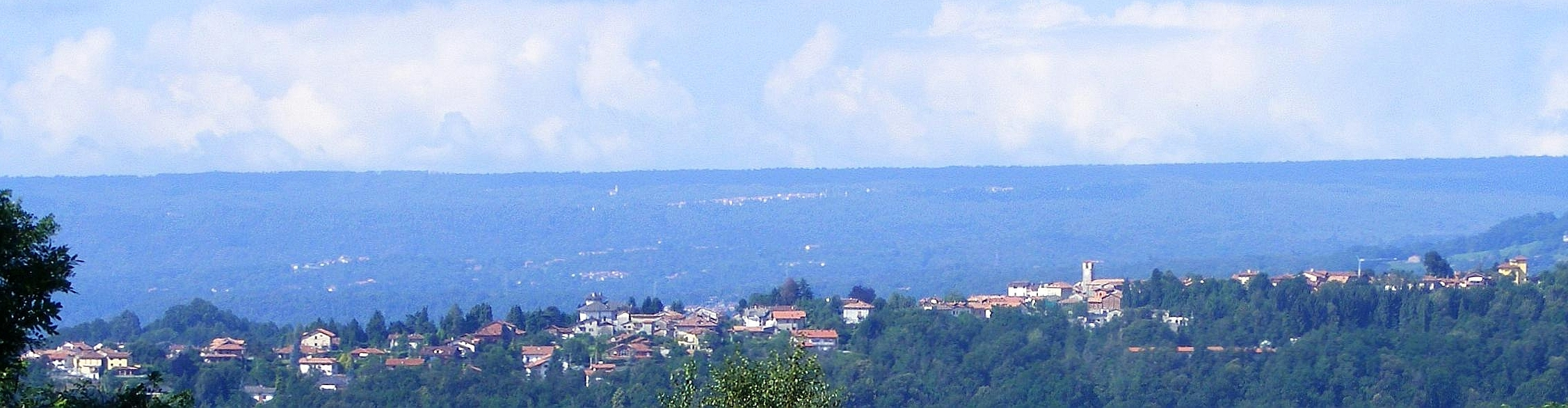
- Panoramic view

- Location of Cossila in Italy
- Coordinates: 45°34′39″N 8°2′31″E
- Country: Italy
- Region: Piedmont
- Province: Biella (BI)
- Comune: Biella
- Elevation: 545 m (1,788 ft)
- Time zone: UTC+1 (CET)
  - Summer (DST): UTC+2 (CEST)
- Postal code: 13900
- Dialing code: (+39) 015

Cossila is a neighbourhood of Biella, in Piedmont, northern Italy.

== Overview ==
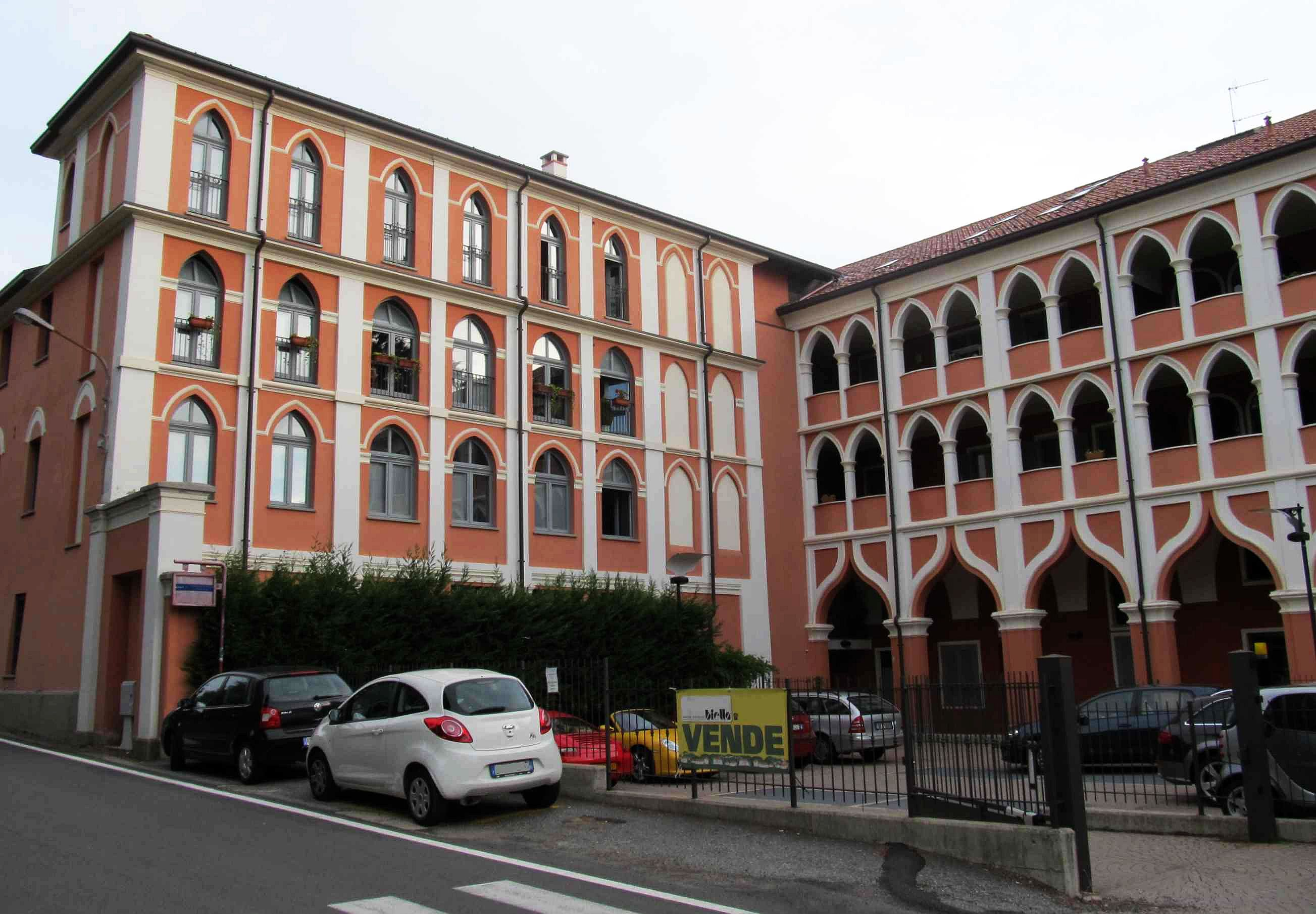
The former hydrotherapic clinic of Cossila as seen in 2012

It is a borough located some km north-west from the centre of Biella, along the road leading to the sanctuary of Oropa. From its elongated shape came the Piedmontese saying Cosila, longa e sotila (in English: Cossila, long and thin).

Its southernmost part is called Cossila San Grato and the northernmost one Cossila San Giovanni.

== History ==
Since 1940 Cossila was a separate comune (municipality), which also encompassed the village of Favaro.
