= Giulio Cesare Viancini =

His Excellency Giulio Cesare Viancini
- Archbishop of Sassari
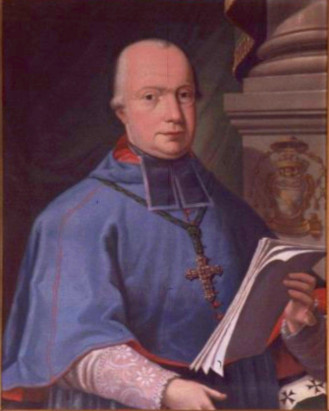
- Church: Roman Catholic Church
- Archdiocese: Sassari
- Installed: 10 July 1763
- Term ended: 22 October 1797

Orders
- Ordination: 21 February 1750

Personal details
- Born: 18 August 1726 Savigliano
- Died: 22 October 1797 (aged 71) Biella

Giulio Cesare Viancini (19 August 1726 – 22 October 1797) was the elected Archbishop of Sassari.

== Biography ==
Born into a family of comital rank, the son of Carlo Francesco Viancini, Lord of Genola and Torricella, and Teresa Avogadro, he obtained a degree in both canon and civil law from the University of Turin on May 27, 1748.

He was ordained a priest on March 14, 1750. He was a member of the clergy of Santa Maria di Piazza. From November 6, 1751, he was a resident student at the Ecclesiastical Academy of Superga.

On October 8, 1761, he was appointed director of the Royal College of the Provinces in Turin.

On May 16, 1763, he was appointed Archbishop of Sassari, and on July 10 of the same year, he was consecrated bishop in Turin by Cardinal Carlo Vittorio Amedeo delle Lanze.

The alteration of the traditional route of the Corpus Domini procession, specifically, the decision to exclude the medieval district of Piazzo sparked opposition in 1773. Viancini, who was hostile to popular religious practices, also reformed and restricted other processions, provoking protests from the Town Council in 1783.

In 1780, the royal family's pilgrimage to Oropa prompted the bishop to soften his stance, leading him to limit himself to admonishing the faithful about abuses associated with pilgrimages. He showed generosity toward the poor during the famines of 1783 and 1793. In 1789, he founded the minor seminary.

Stricken by an epileptic seizure on July 1, 1795, he died on October 22, 1797.
