= Oropa =

Frazione of Biella, Piedmont, Italy

- Frazione
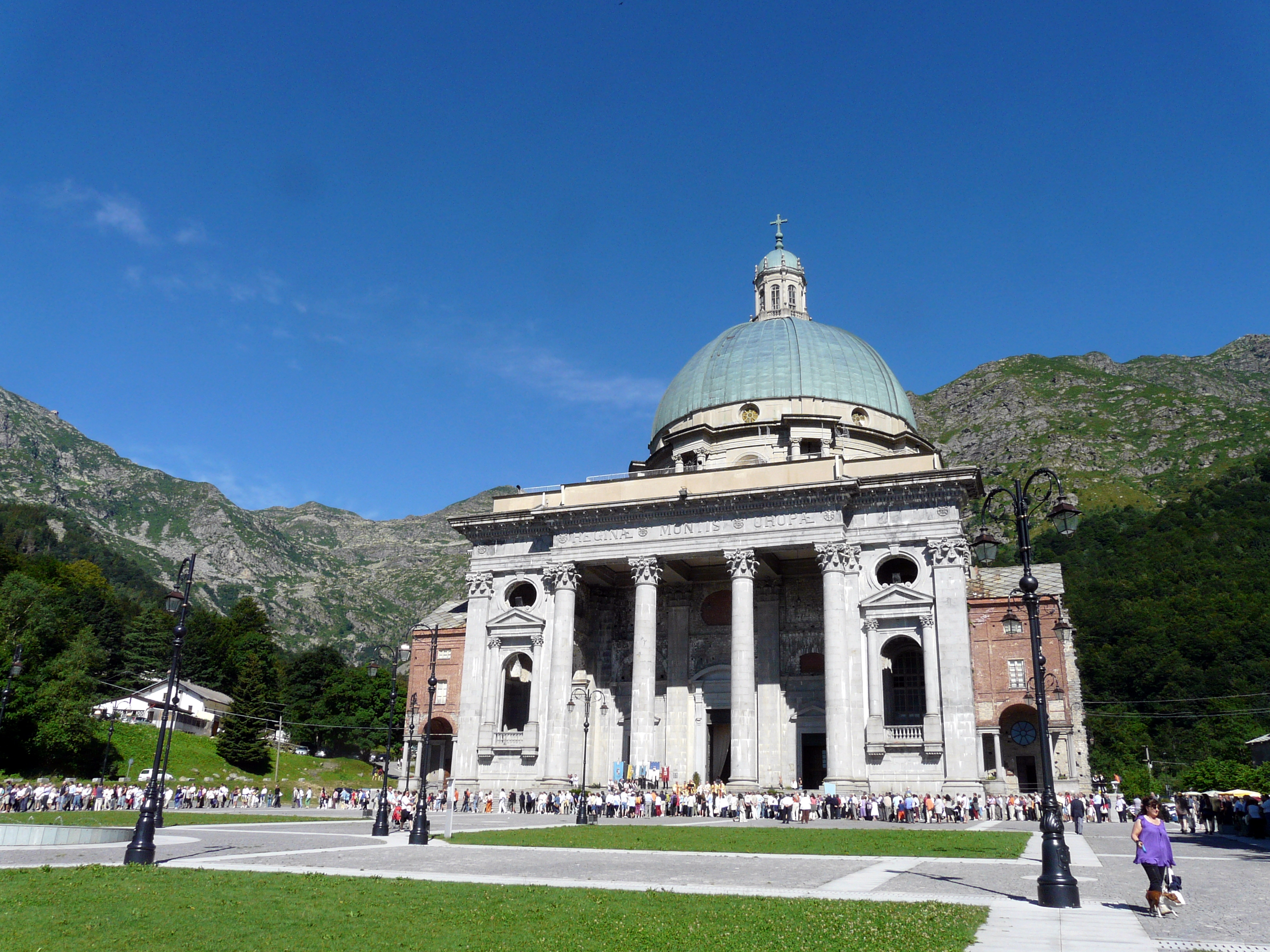

- Location of Oropa in Italy
- Coordinates: 45°37′41″N 7°58′42″E
- Country: Italy
- Region: Piedmont
- Province: Biella (BI)
- Comune: Biella
- Elevation: 1,198 m (3,930 ft)

Population
  - Total: 9
- Time zone: UTC+1 (CET)
  - Summer (DST): UTC+2 (CEST)
- Dialing code: (+39) 015

Oropa is a frazione of the municipality of Biella, in Piedmont, northern Italy. It is known for the Black Virgin of Oropa statue, which is located in the Sanctuary of Oropa, the basilica of the Sacro Monte di Oropa, one of the Sacri Monti. It is an important destination for local tourism and pilgrimage.

In 1874 was established a meteorogical station by Francesco Denza.

In 1998 was opened the botanical garden.

== Monumental cemetery ==
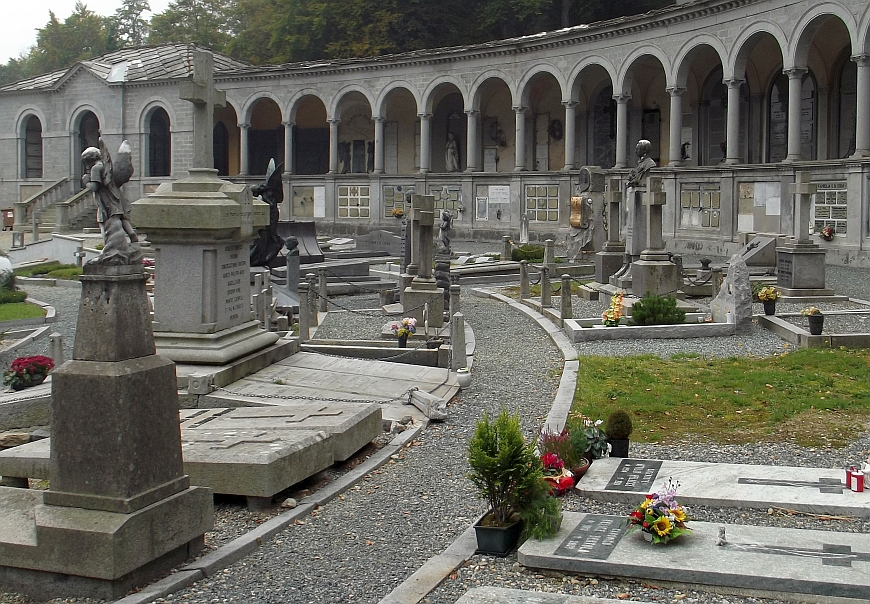
Monumental cemetery

In the monumental cemetery are buried Riccardo Gualino, Quintino Sella and Vittorio Sella.

== Sport ==
Oropa has been the finish line of a stage of the Giro d'Italia seven times.

== Climate ==
Climate data for Oropa, elevation 1,222 m (4,009 ft), (1991–2020)
Month	Jan	Feb	Mar	Apr	May	Jun	Jul	Aug	Sep	Oct	Nov	Dec	Year
Mean daily maximum °C (°F)	4.8 (40.6)	5.3 (41.5)	8.1 (46.6)	10.8 (51.4)	15.1 (59.2)	19.3 (66.7)	21.9 (71.4)	21.2 (70.2)	16.6 (61.9)	11.8 (53.2)	8.0 (46.4)	5.1 (41.2)	12.3 (54.2)
Daily mean °C (°F)	1.4 (34.5)	1.6 (34.9)	4.3 (39.7)	7.1 (44.8)	11.3 (52.3)	15.2 (59.4)	17.5 (63.5)	17.2 (63.0)	13.0 (55.4)	8.7 (47.7)	5.0 (41.0)	1.9 (35.4)	8.7 (47.6)
Mean daily minimum °C (°F)	−2.1 (28.2)	−2.1 (28.2)	0.5 (32.9)	3.4 (38.1)	7.5 (45.5)	11.1 (52.0)	13.2 (55.8)	13.1 (55.6)	9.4 (48.9)	5.6 (42.1)	2.0 (35.6)	−1.3 (29.7)	5.0 (41.1)
Average precipitation mm (inches)	55.0 (2.17)	53.9 (2.12)	91.8 (3.61)	219.4 (8.64)	263.8 (10.39)	191.0 (7.52)	129.9 (5.11)	146.5 (5.77)	210.3 (8.28)	214.6 (8.45)	228.3 (8.99)	68.7 (2.70)	1,873.2 (73.75)
Source: Istituto Superiore per la Protezione e la Ricerca Ambientale

== See also ==
- Cane di Oropa
- Pezzata Rossa d'Oropa
