= Chiavazza =

- Frazione
- Location of Chiavazza in Italy
- Coordinates: 45°36′06″N 8°4′28″E
- Country: Italy
- Region: Piedmont
- Province: Biella (BI)
- Comune: biella
- Elevation: 390 m (1,280 ft)
- Time zone: UTC+1 (CET)
  - Summer (DST): UTC+2 (CEST)
- Postal code: 13900
- Dialing code: (+39) 015

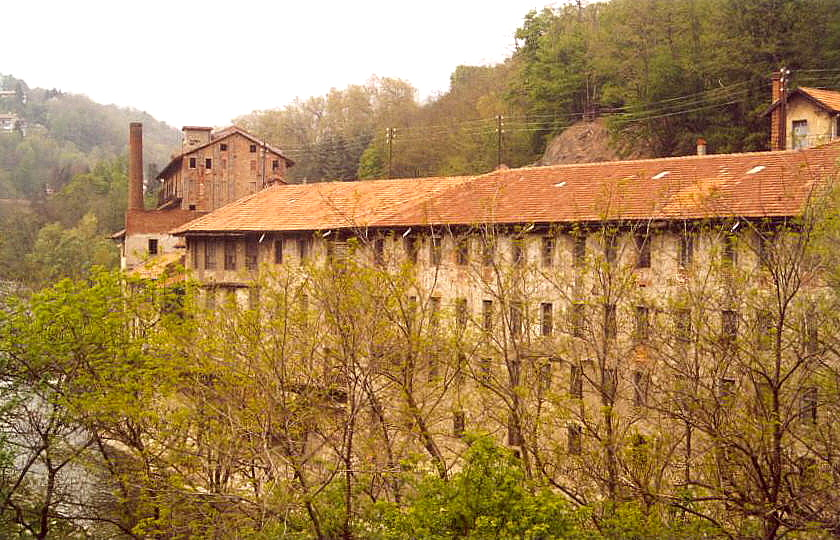
A former factory in Chiavazza.

Chiavazza is a frazione (parish) of the municipality of Biella, in Piedmont, northern Italy.

== Overview ==
Chiavazza is a borough located in the eastern sector of the city, to which it is connected by a bridge above the Cervo River, and was once a separate commune. It is crossed by the Via Milano, which connects Biella to Vigliano Biellese. Along the road are numerous villas, including the Villa Mosca, surrounded by a lavish 18th century-style garden.
