= Leone Azzali =

Italian politician

Leone Azzali (7 January 1880 - 1 January 1963) was an Italian politician.

Azzali was born in Biella. He represented the Italian Republican Party in the Constituent Assembly of Italy in 1948.
