= Biella funicular =

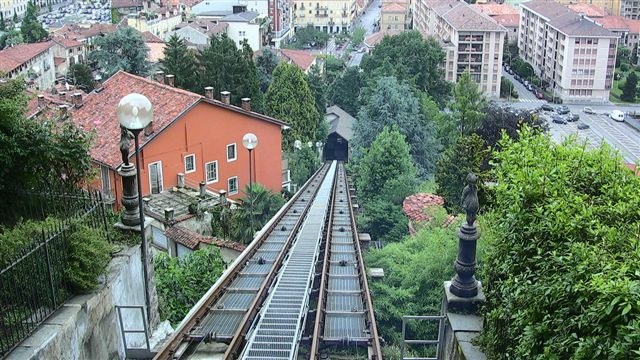
- The line in 2010

Overview
- Status: Open
- Locale: Biella, Piedmont, Italy
- Coordinates: 45.566922°N 8.047294°E
- Termini: Via Curiel, Biella Piano; Via Avogadro, Biella Piazzo
- Stations: 2

Service
- Type: Funicular

History
- Opened: 1885

Technical
- Line length: 177 m
- Track gauge: 1,000 mm (3 ft 3 3/8 in)
- Maximum incline: 33,5 %

The Biella funicular (Italian: Funicolare di Biella) is a funicular railway in the city of Biella, Piedmont, Italy. It connects a lower station on Via Curiel, in the city's Biella Piano quarter, with an upper station on Via Avogadro in the city's medieval Biella Piazzo quarter.

The funicular first opened in December 1885, and was initially operated by water counterbalance. It was converted to electric operation in 1899, and was rebuilt, with new cars, in 1975. The line reopened in July 2018 after a further closure for maintenance and upgrade costing €1.8 million. The upgrade involved the provision of new cars, the renovation of both stations, and the replacement of track and cables.

The line has two cars, both with a capacity of 18 passengers, and operates continuously from 07:00 to 24:00, and later on Fridays and Saturdays.

== See also ==
- List of funicular railways
