= Giovanni Battista Canaveri =

- Bishop of Archdiocese of Vercelli; February 1, 1805 - January 11, 1811; Diocese of Biella; July 24, 1797 - June 1, 1803
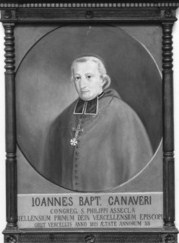

Orders
- Ordination: September 21, 1776
- Consecration: Priest by Arcidiocesi di Torino

Personal details
- Born: 1753 Borgomaro, Kingdom of Sardinia
- Died: 1811 (aged 57–58) Vercelli, Piedmont
- Denomination: Catholic (Roman Rite)
- Profession: ecclesiastical
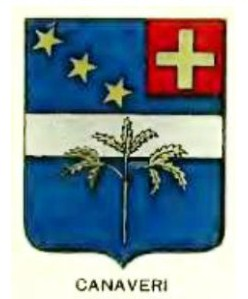
- Coat of arms: Giovanni Battista Canaveri's coat of arms

Ordination history of Giovanni Battista Canaveri

Giovanni Battista Canaveri (1753-1811) was an Italian nobleman, Bishop of Biella and Vercelli, first Aumônier of Madame Letizia. He was appointed as Baron of the French Empire in February 1808.

== Biography ==
Canaveri was born September 25, 1753, in Borgomaro, Liguria (Italy), his family was originally from Piedmont and Alpes-Maritimes. His father had exercised the first Magistracy, in the city of Borgomaro. He began his studies at Giaveno and finished at the University of Turin where he received a doctorate at the age of 18. He then studied at the Oratory of Saint Philip Neri, and was ordained a priest on September 21, 1776, by the Archdiocese of Turin. In 1797 he was appointed Bishop of Biella, was consecrated in Rome, but by the request of Pius VII he resigned his position. He was consecrated bishop of Vercelli on February 4, 1805.

Confessor of the Princess María Felicita of Savoy, Giovanni Canaveri had founded the "Convitto Principessa Maria Felicita di Savoia," a home created for Noble ladies. The institution was led by the same Canaveri.

== French Empire ==
Because of their aversion to the Jacobins, Canaveri not had difficulty in accepting the government of the First Consul, and in these pastoral letters of 29 September 1801 and 4 Vendemiaire of 1802, he threatened with divine suspension, of the anti-French priests who were against the annexation of the Piedmont to the territory of France. His pro-French attitude, aroused the disapproval of his clergy. On June 1, 1803, was suppressed the diocese of Biella, Canaveri moved to Paris, where he became a member of the Council of the Great Emperor, and was appointed first Chaplain of Letizia Ramolino, mother of Napoleon. After the appointment as Bishop of Vercelli, Canaveri made frequent trips to Paris: from May to October 1806, December 1807 to March 1808, from the summer until October 28, 1808, then again in June 1810. In February of that 1808 was appointed Baron of the Empire. He adopted the Frenchified name of Jean-Baptiste Canavery.

== Works ==
His pastoral letters were mostly a political content and decidedly anti-Jacobin, was the author of Panegyrics, including san Giuseppe and sant'Eusebio. He also wrote some Pastoral Letters in Latin and Italian among them; Dell'ubbidienza dovuta al sovrano; Notizia compendiosa dei monasterj della Trappa, fondati dopo la rivoluzione di Francia.

Giovanni Battista Canaveri died in the Diocese of Vercelli on January 13, 1811.
