= Dalmazzo =

Dalmazzo is a surname. Notable people with the surname include:

- Maria Dalmazzo (born 1983), Colombian actress
- Nicola Dalmazzo (died 1653), Roman Catholic prelate
- Renzo Dalmazzo (1886–1959), Italian lieutenant general
