= Birra Menabrea =

Italian brewing company

Coordinates: 45.571021°N 8.0499962°E

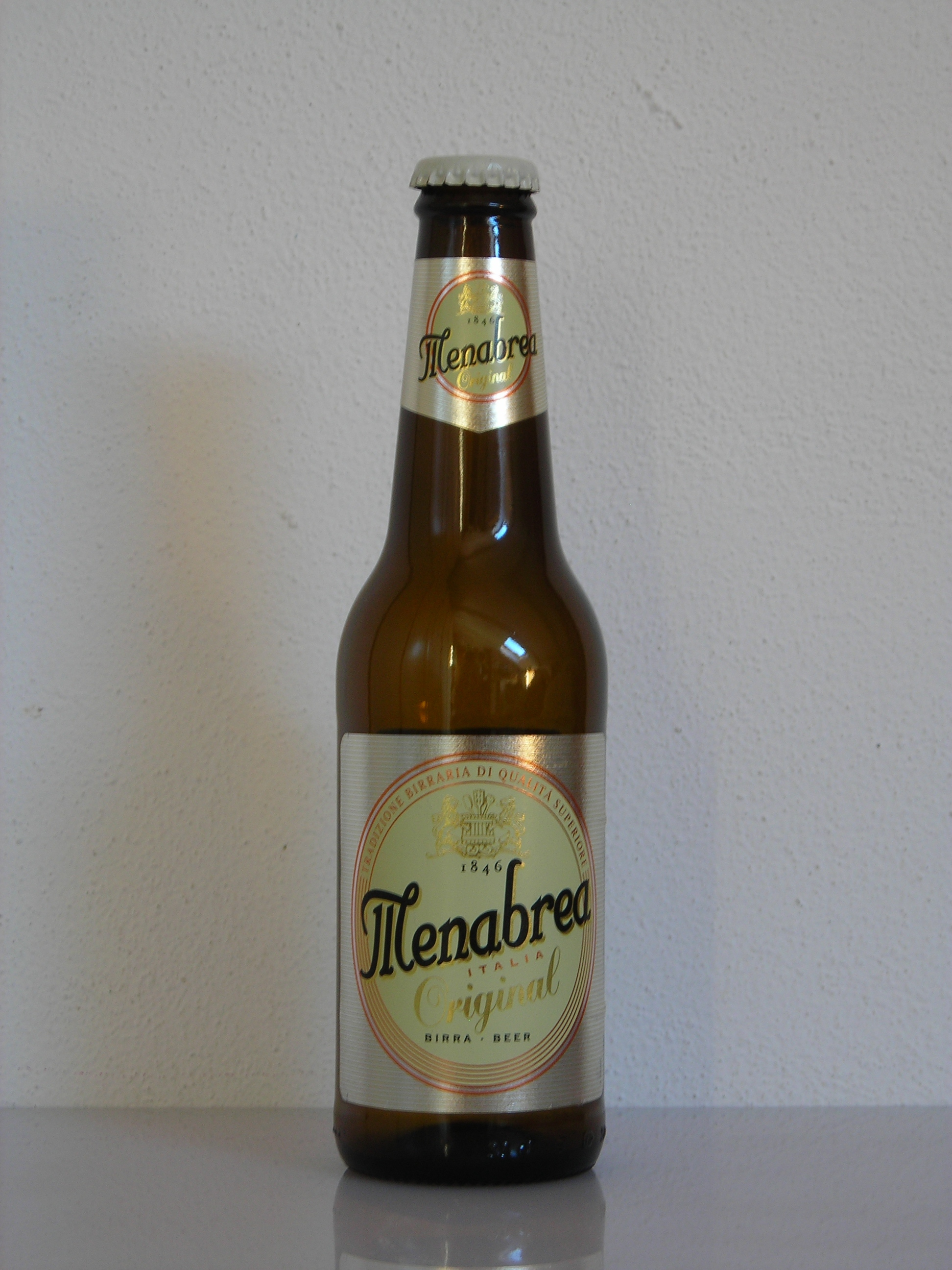
- Industry: Alcoholic beverage
- Founded: 1846
- Headquarters: Biella, Italy
- Products: Beer
- Owner: Forst

Birra Menabrea is an Italian brewing company located in Biella, Piedmont. Under this label - distributed since the early nineties by Birra Forst, but owned by the Thedy family (heir of the founders of the company) - around 100 thousand hectolitres of beer are produced annually, part of which for export to twenty countries.

== Related products ==
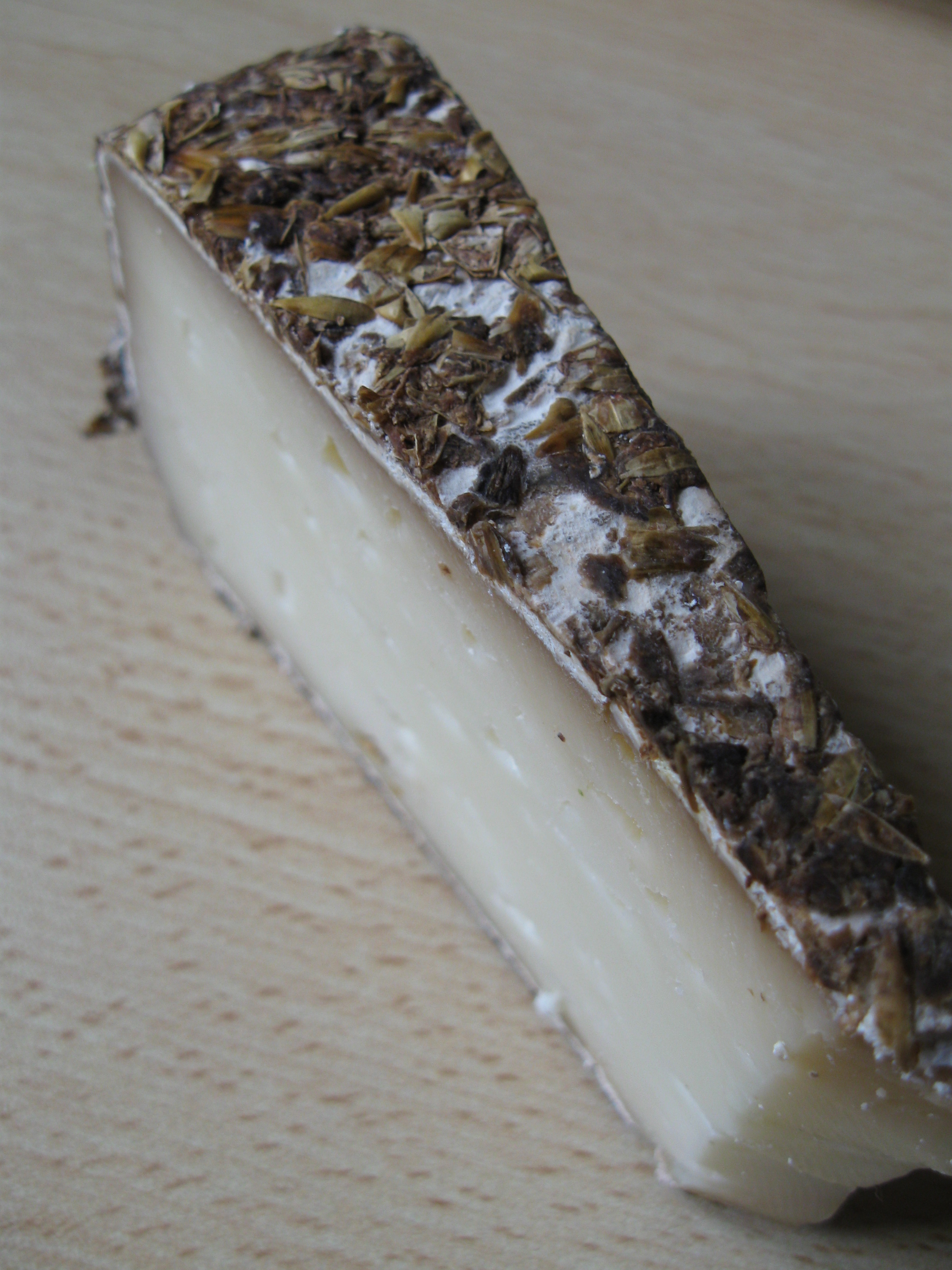
"Sbirro" the Menabrea beer cheese

Sbirro is a cheese made with the Menabrea beer.
