= Giardino Botanico di Oropa =

Botanical garden in Italy

Coordinates: 45°37′42″N 7°58′44″E

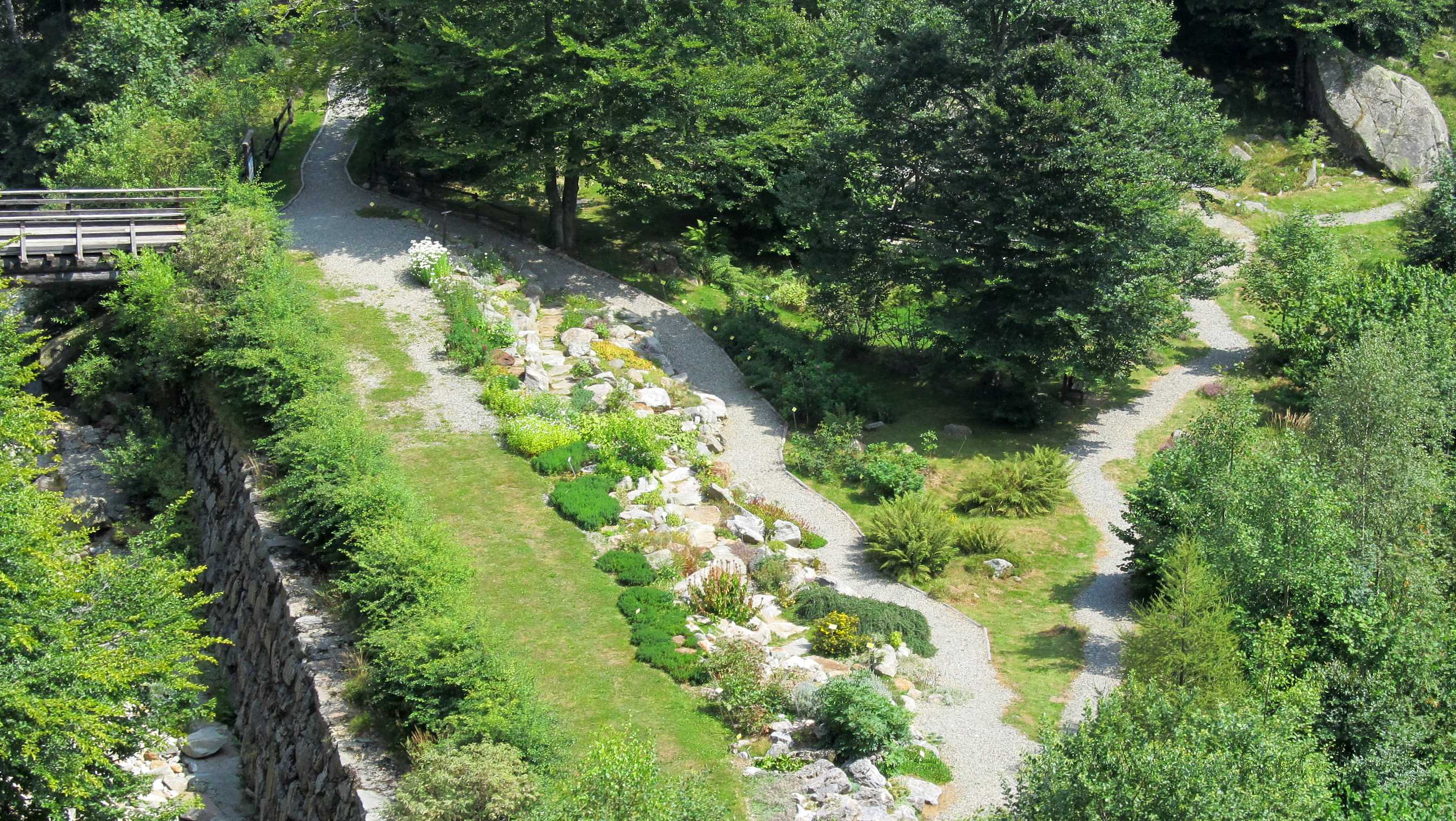
View from the Oropa-lago del Mucrone cableway

The Giardino Botanico di Oropa is a nature preserve and botanical garden located at an altitude of 1200 m in Oropa about 12 km northwest of Biella, Piedmont, Italy. Situated near the Black Virgin Sanctuary, it is open daily except Mondays in the warmer months.

== Description ==
The garden covers several acres on either side of the Torrente Oropa and is managed by the World Wide Fund for Nature for Biella. It's primarily a nature preserve, but also houses mountain plants from around the world. The majority of the site is indigenous beech woodlands with many herbaceous perennials and small shrubs, including blueberry and rhododendron. The garden also contains lichens and mosses, as well as Campanula barbata, Campanula excisa Schleicher (the garden's symbol), Gentiana purpurea, Lilium martagon, Lonicera nigra, Prenanthes purpurea, and Rosa pendulina.

== See also ==
- List of botanical gardens in Italy
