= Sanctuary of Oropa =

- Santuario della beata Vergine di Oropa
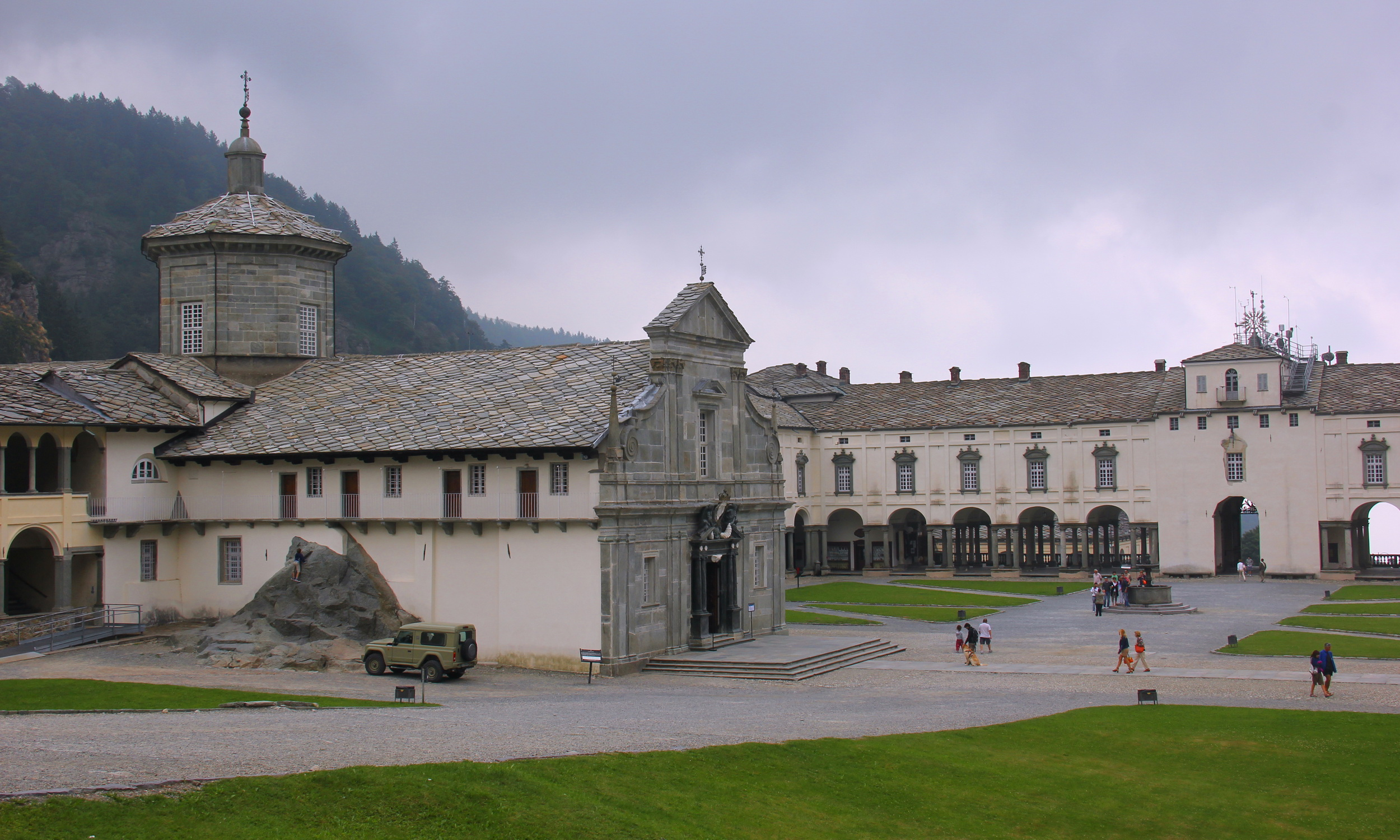
- View of the Ancient Basilica

- Location within Italy
- 45.628333°N 7.978889°E
- Location: Oropa, Biella
- Country: Italy
- Denomination: Catholic
- Website: www.santuariodioropa.it/db/it/

History
- Dedication: Black Virgin of Oropa

Architecture
- Architectural type: Mainly baroque
- Completed: 1960

Administration
- Diocese: Diocese of Biella

The Sanctuary of Oropa (Italian: santuario di Oropa) is a group of Roman Catholic buildings and structures in Oropa, frazione of the municipality of Biella, Italy. It is located at a height of 1,159 metres in a small valley of the Alpi Biellesi.

== Madonna Della Oropa ==
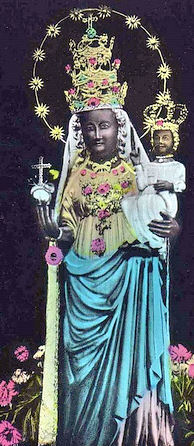
The image wearing its centennial crowns (offered by the local townspeople) of 1620, 1720, and 1820, respectively

The Black Madonna of Oropa, is a darkened wood pigmented statue of the Madonna and Child.

=== Legend ===
According to pious legend, a black wooden statue of the Virgin Mary carved by Saint Luke was found in Jerusalem by Bishop Eusebius of Vercelli and brought to Vercelli in the 4th century AD

The image was brought by Saint Eusebius of Vercelli from the Middle East, presumably from Syria or Lebanon to his diocese of Vercelli. During a mid-fourth century persecution of Christians by the local Celtic pagans, Eusebius retreated to the mountains of Sacro Monte di Oropa, about 9 miles from Biella, Italy and hid the statue of the Madonna in a cave. When they later tried to move the image, its weight was supernaturally increased and they had to leave it there, in the mountains, where it currently presides over a massive shrine. Pious believers interpret the supernatural weight of the image to be a sign from the Blessed Virgin Mary that she willed a sanctuary be built there.

Local legends further claim that before the arrival of Eusebius, the Celtic tribes worshipped a black fertility god which was allegedly replaced by the present Madonna and Child image.

The Black Virgin is also known as Madonna Nera di Oropa or María Reina de Monte Oropa, and she is the patroness of Lomas del Mirador City, in La Matanza Partido, Buenos Aires Province, Argentina.

=== History ===
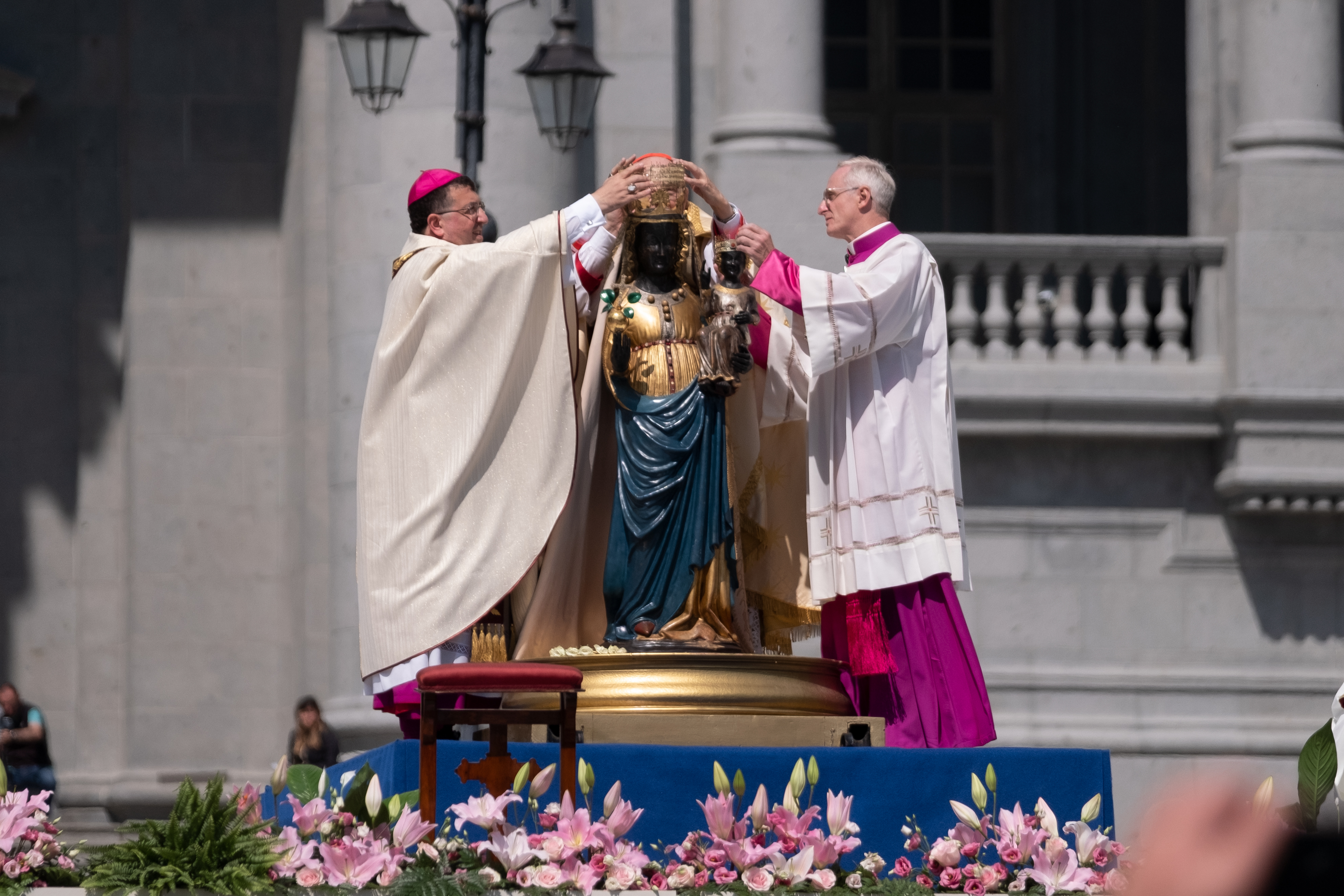
The pontifical coronation of the Black Madonna of Oropa on 29 August 2021.

The sculpture is made of cedar of Lebanon, with face and hands painted black, and decorated with gold and gemstones. Despite the legend, in reality it "is a refined masterpiece by a sculptor from Valle d'Aosta dating back to the late thirteenth century." The statue is housed in the Old Basilica.

The venerated Marian image was first episcopally crowned by Bishop Giacomo Goria on 30 August 1620. The event is commemorated every 100 years since 1620 with a coronation held on the last Sunday of August. It was postponed for a year in 2020 due to the pandemic. Pope Francis granted an official decree of Pontifical coronation to the image on 5 August 2021, signed and executed by the Dean of the College of Cardinals, Giovanni Battista Re at the Vatican. The coronation was officially carried out on 29 August 2021.

== Santuario di Oropa ==
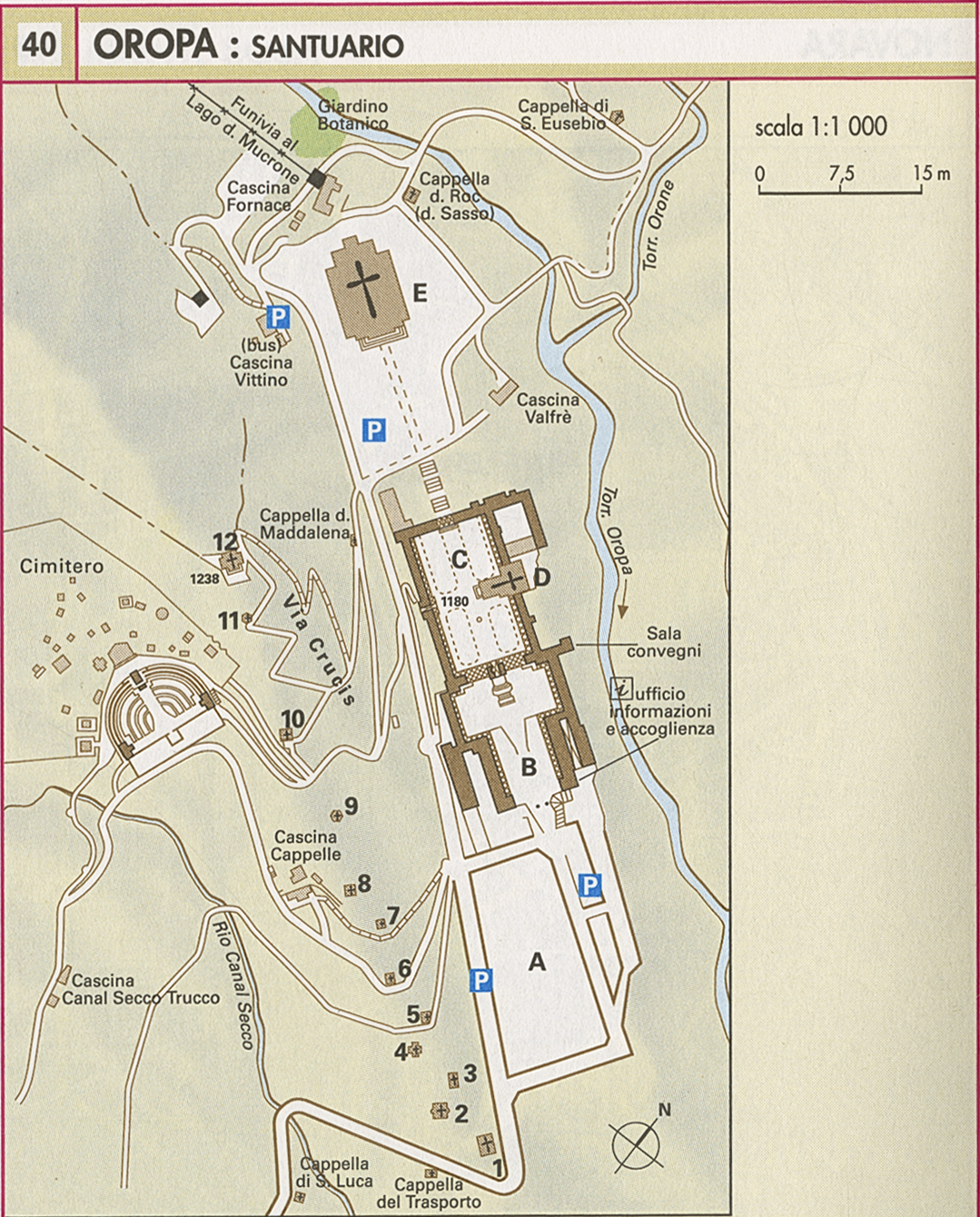
Plan of the Sanctuary

=== History ===
According to legend, a black wooden statue of the Virgin Mary carved by Saint Luke was found in Jerusalem by Saint Eusebius of Vercelli, carried to Oropa in the 4th century AD and placed into a small niche in a big boulder. In the Middle Ages, a church was built around the niche housing the statue, and was replaced in the early 17th century with what is known today as the Ancient Basilica. During the following two centuries, several other buildings were added to the complex, including the royal apartments of the House of Savoy, a big library and the Royal Gate, a masterpiece designed by the architect Filippo Juvarra in the 18th century.

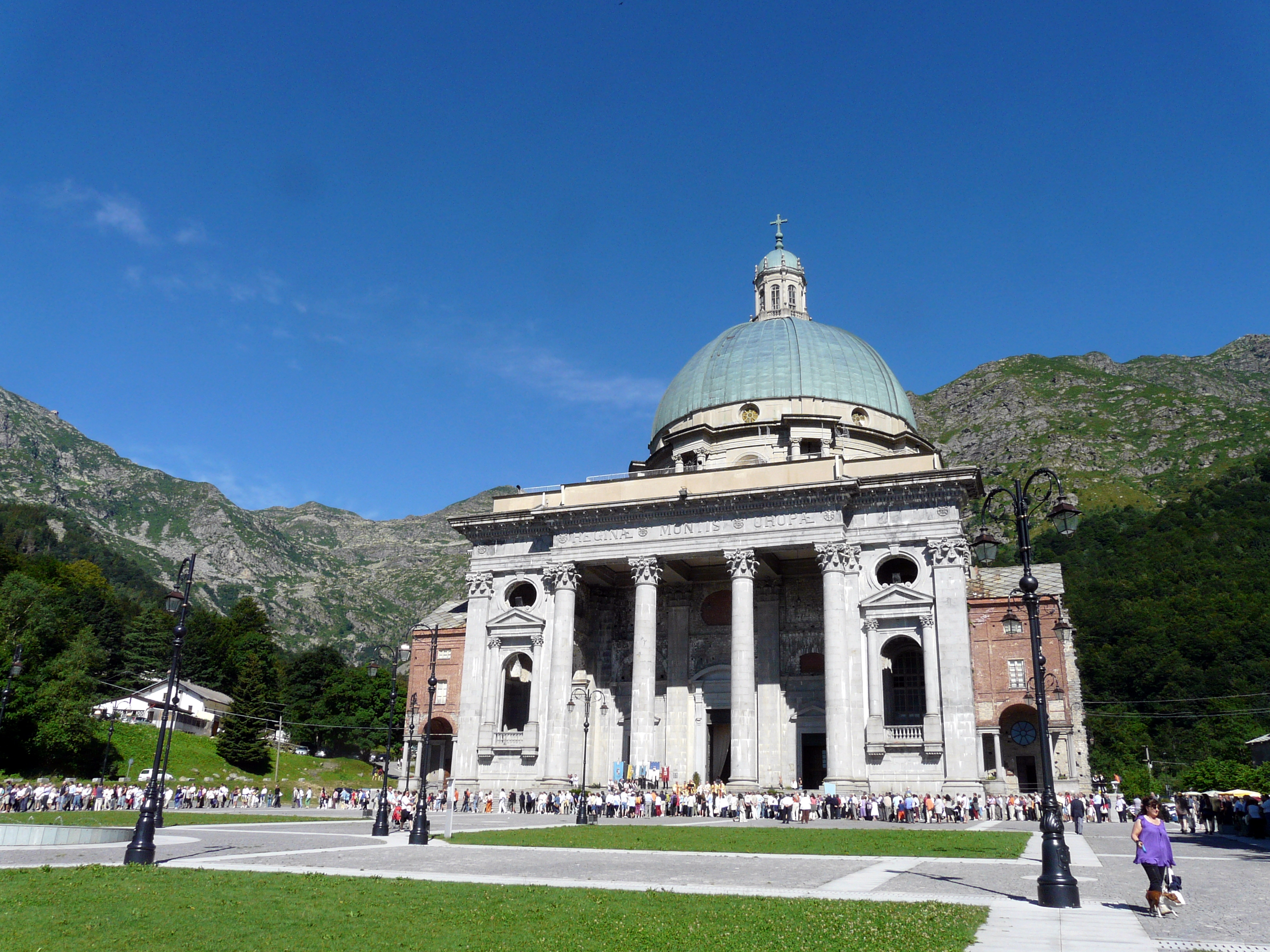
The Upper Basilica

The last addition to the sanctuary was the Upper Basilica, a monumental church built between 1885 and 1960 due to the large number of pilgrims visiting Oropa. It can hold 3000 people and its dome is 80 metres high.

In 1617, the complex of the Sacro Monte di Oropa (literally Sacred Mount of Oropa) was built not far from the sanctuary. It is a devotional path now composed of twelve chapels (plus another seven nearby) containing groups of statues representing scenes from the story of the Virgin Mary's life.

A new graveyard was built near the Sacro Monte in the 19th century, for noble families of the Biellese territory to build their family tombs. Some graves have freemason symbols, such as Quintino Sella's.

=== Devotion and popular beliefs ===
The statue of the black Madonna has always been venerated; several miracles and protections are attributed to the Virgin of Oropa. Blessed Pier Giorgio Frassati was known for his devotion to the Black Madonna of Oropa.

During the centuries, people made ex-voto (for grace) pictures to thank the Virgin Mary. All of these pictures are still preserved in the sanctuary in the 'ex voto gallery'. The oldest picture dates back to 1522 and was made by painter Bernardino Lanino.

Popular belief says that the wooden statue has no woodworm despite its age, the foot is not worn out despite the ancient tradition of touching it for good luck, and that dust does not settle on the faces of the Virgin and of the Baby.

=== Pilgrimages ===
Around 800,000 pilgrims and one-hundred pilgrimages visit the sanctuary each year.

According to the popular tradition, the town of Biella made a vow during the 17th century plague and its inhabitants were spared by the infection. Following this grace, the town does a pilgrimage every year to the sanctuary in order to thank the Virgin Mary.

The evocative and ancient pilgrimage from Fontainemore to Oropa takes place every five years.

=== Nature conservation ===
The mountain area surrounding the sanctuary is included in a regional park of 1,518.28 ha (code: EUAP0882) named Riserva Naturale Speciale del Sacro Monte di Oropa.

== See also ==
- Oropa
- Sacro Monte di Oropa
- Giardino Botanico di Oropa
- CoEur - In the heart of European paths
- Path of Saint Charles
- Giro d'Italia
