= San Dalmazzo, Turin =

Church of San Dalmazzo
- Chiesa di San Dalmazzo
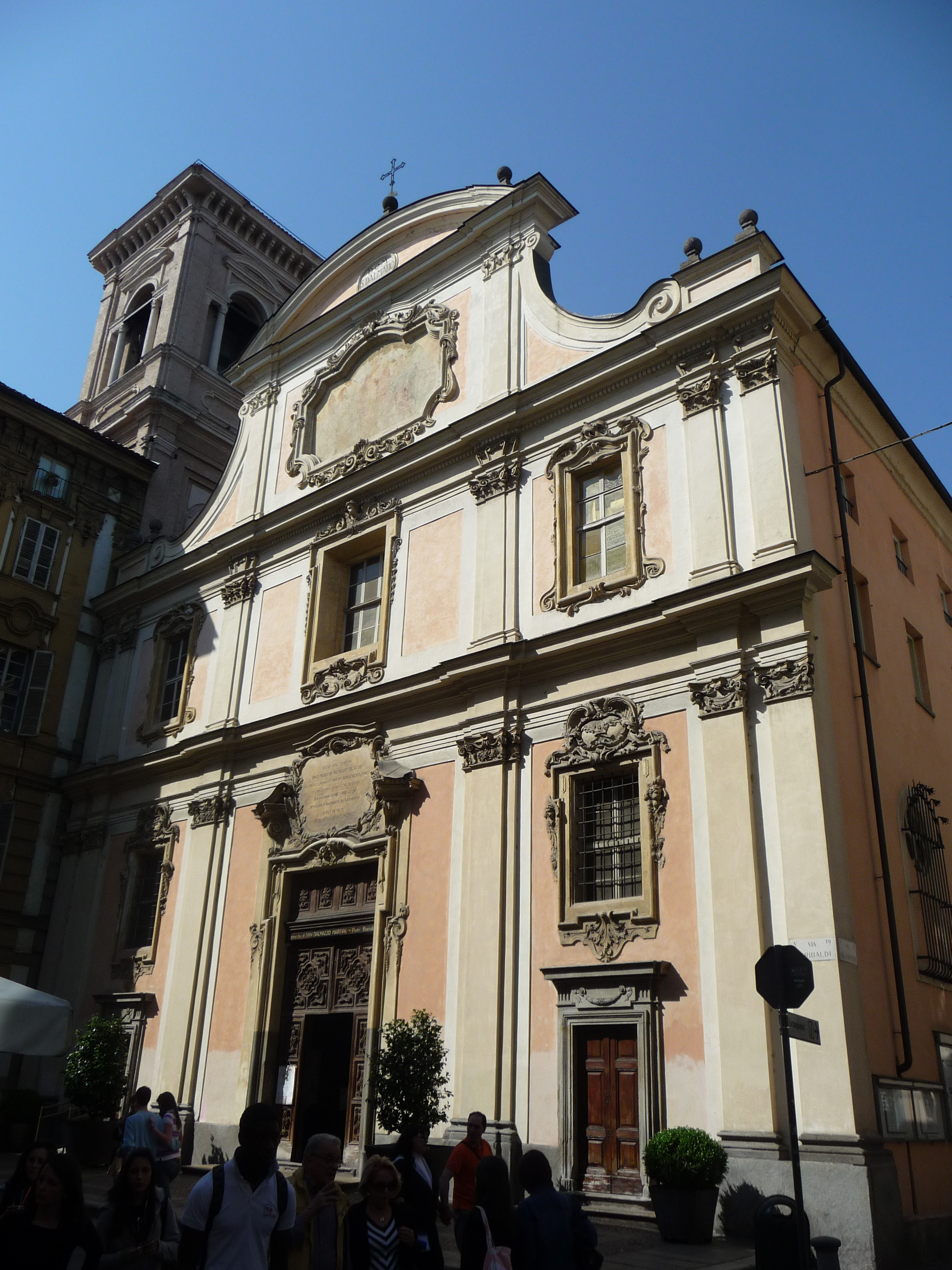
- Façade of the church

- Map of Turin
- 45°04′26″N 7°40′40″E
- Country: Italy
- Denomination: Roman Catholic Church

Architecture
- Style: Gothic Revival

Administration
- Archdiocese: Turin

San Dalmazzo is a Roman Catholic church on via Garibaldi, in central Turin, region of Piedmont, Italy. It is dedicated to Saint Dalmatius of Pavia.

== History ==
A church on the site is documented from the 11th century, but the present church was reconstructed in 1702. In 1885 the interior was redecorated in neo-gothic style. Adjacent to the church is the former convent and school of the Barnabite order. From 1271 to 1606, the church had been linked to the Order of Canons Regular of Sant'Antonio of Vienne, but then was transferred along with the convent to the Barnabites.

The nave was painted by Enrico Reffo in 1895–1916. The interior also contains 18th century canvases and an antique baptismal font.

Between 1629 and 1631 the chapel of the Madonna of Loreto was built, imitating the Casa Santa (Holy House), which contains an icon related to Marian Apparitions.

In 1271 the church was entrusted to the Hospital Brothers of St. Anthony, that supported it until 1606, when passed, with the joined convent, to Barnabites. Since May 2016 the rector is father Emiliano Redaelli.

== Bibliography ==
- Touring Club Italiano, La Sindone e i percorsi del sacro a Torino e in Piemonte, Torino, 1998.

== Gallery ==
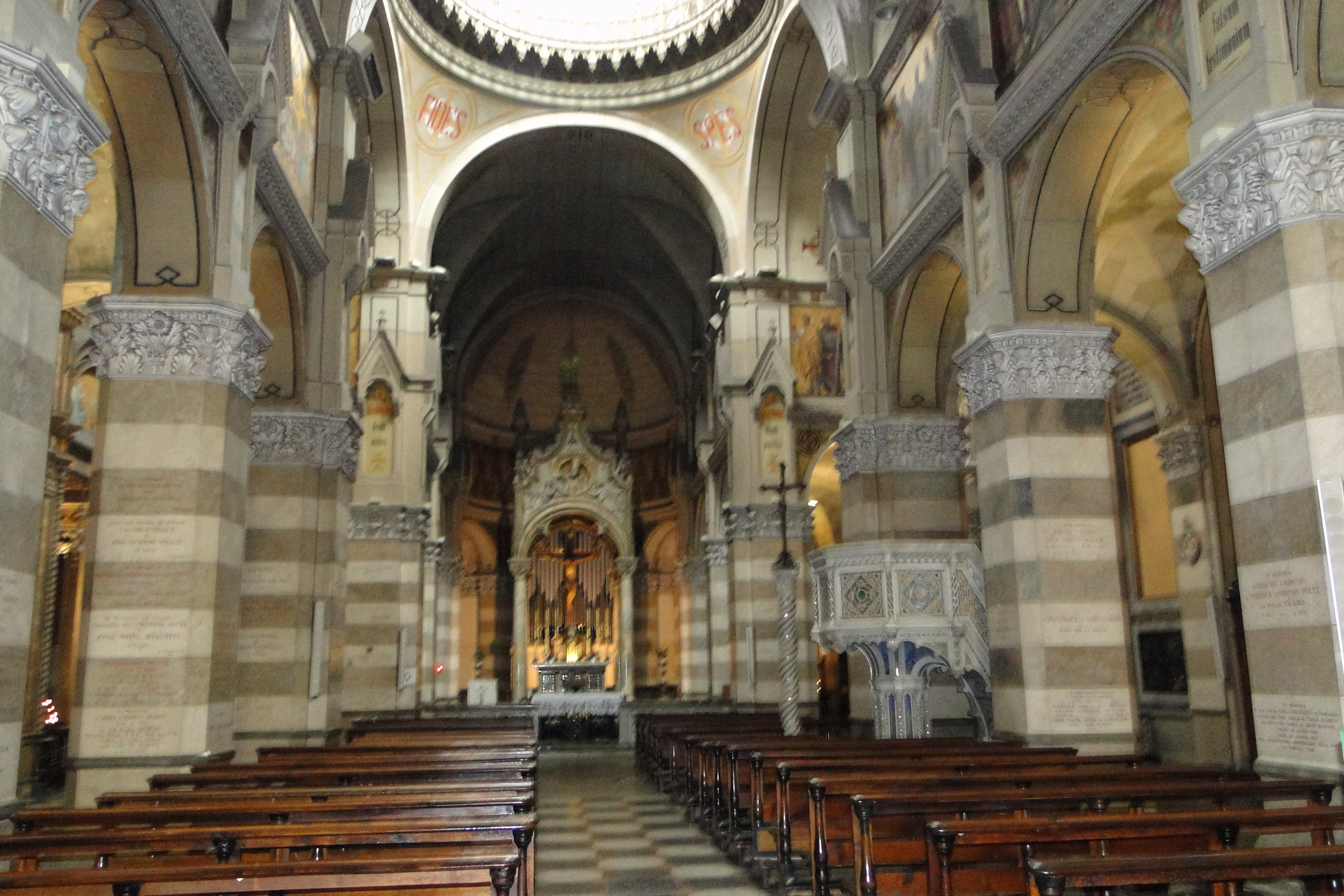
Interior of the church

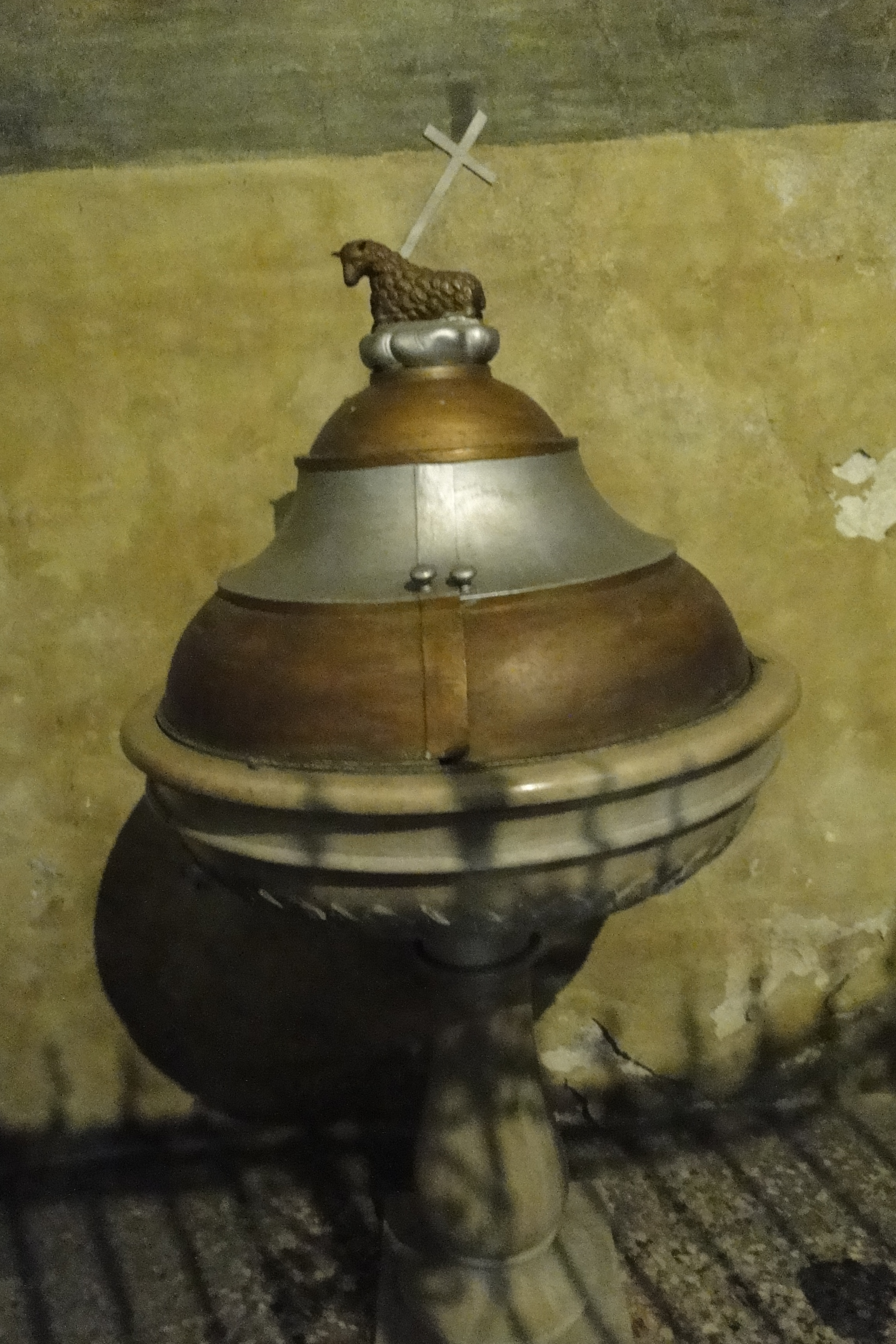
The baptismal font
