= Luigi Vacca =

Italian painter (1778–1854)

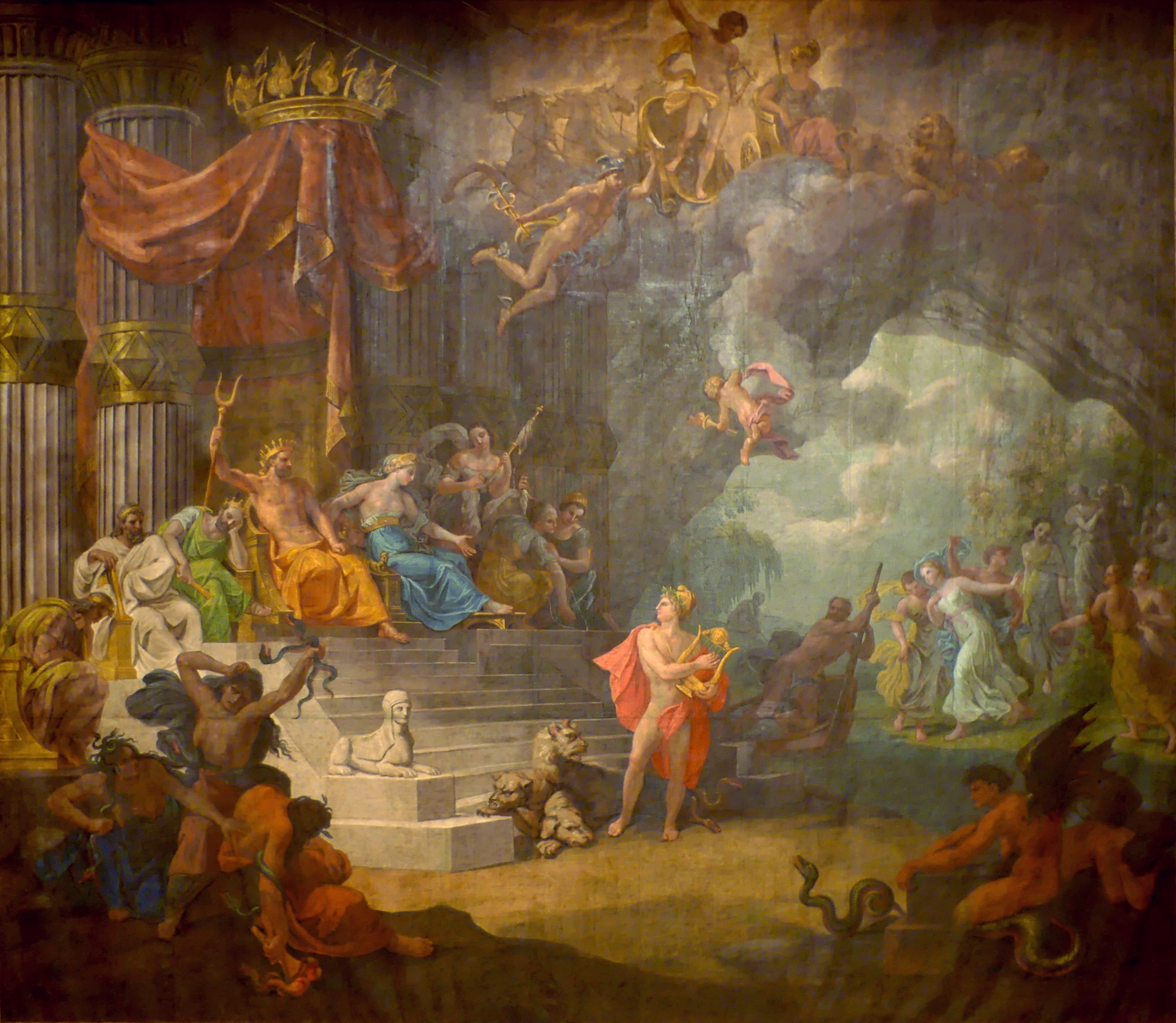
Drop curtain for Theater of Chambéry, Savoy; depicting Orpheus playing lyre to retrieve his wife, Eurydice, from the underworld

Luigi Vacca (1778–1854) was an Italian painter and scenic designer, active in the Piedmont.

He was trained under first his father, Angelo Vacca the elder, and later with Filippo Collino and Laurent Pécheux. He was a scenic designer for the Royal Theater of Turin and the Teatro Carignano for five decades. He painted the sipario of the theater. He taught this line of work at the Accademia Albertina. He also painted canvases depicting historic and mythologic subjects, such as Votive prayer of the people of Carmagnola asking for the cessation of the plague (1810) for the Collegiata di Carmagnola, Turin and La vendetta di Latona, exhibited posthumously at the Promotrice of Turin 1892.

He was involved in the decoration of numerous palaces and churches, such as the Palazzo Pellizzari (1810) in Valenza, Alessandria; the Castle of Covone (1820) in Cuneo; the Abbey of Altacomba (1826–27) in Savoy; and the church of Santi Martiri (circa 1844) in Turin. From 1829 to 1835, he was active mainly in Sassari, Sardinia, in the decoration (Palazzo Civico, Teatro, university, and Duomo), often in collaboration with P. Bossi and G. Cominotti. His son, Cesare (died circa 1836), was also a scenic designer.
