= Sacro Monte di Oropa =

Coordinates: 45°37′43″N 7°58′41″E

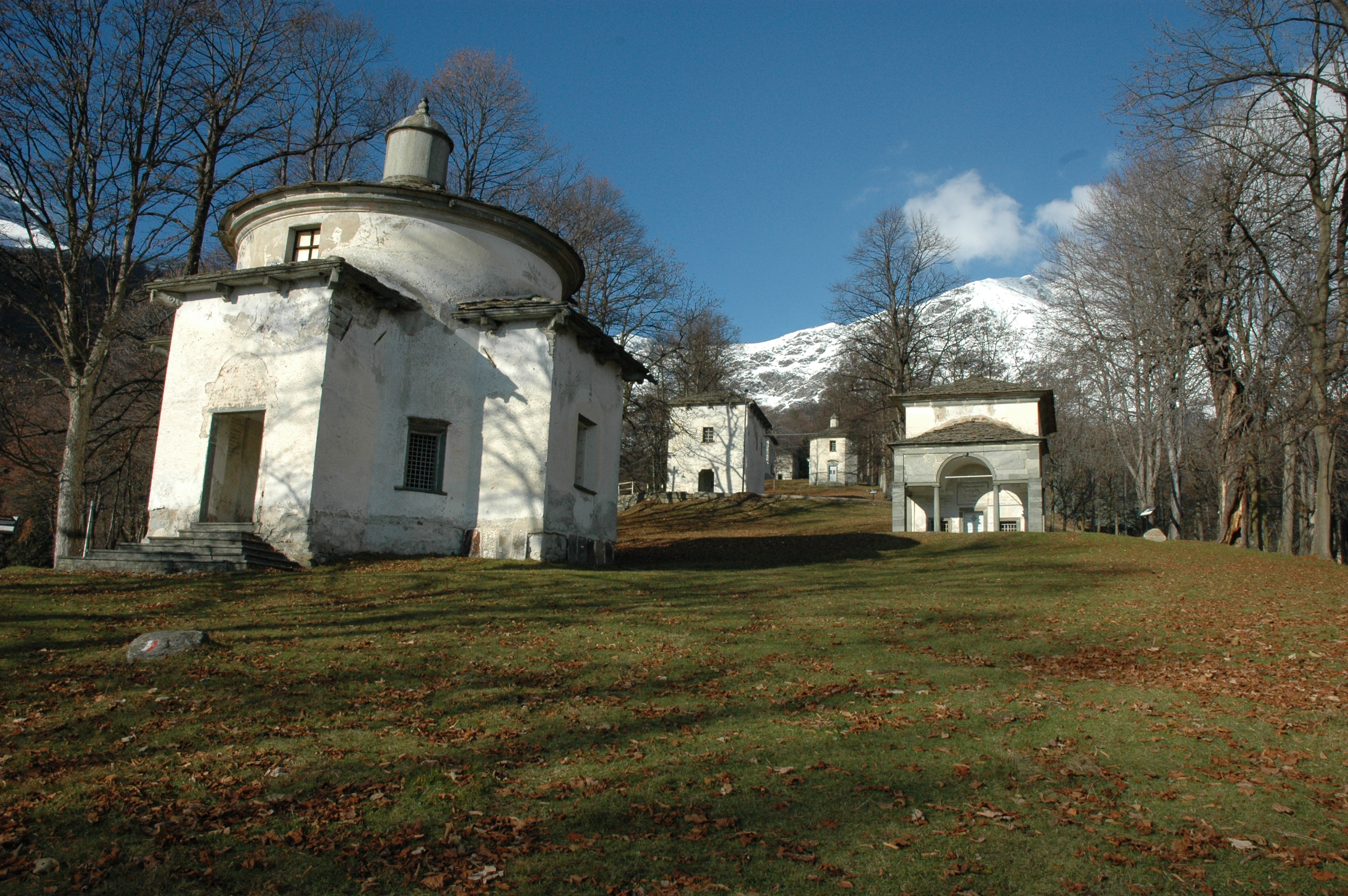
View of the Sacro Monte of Oropa

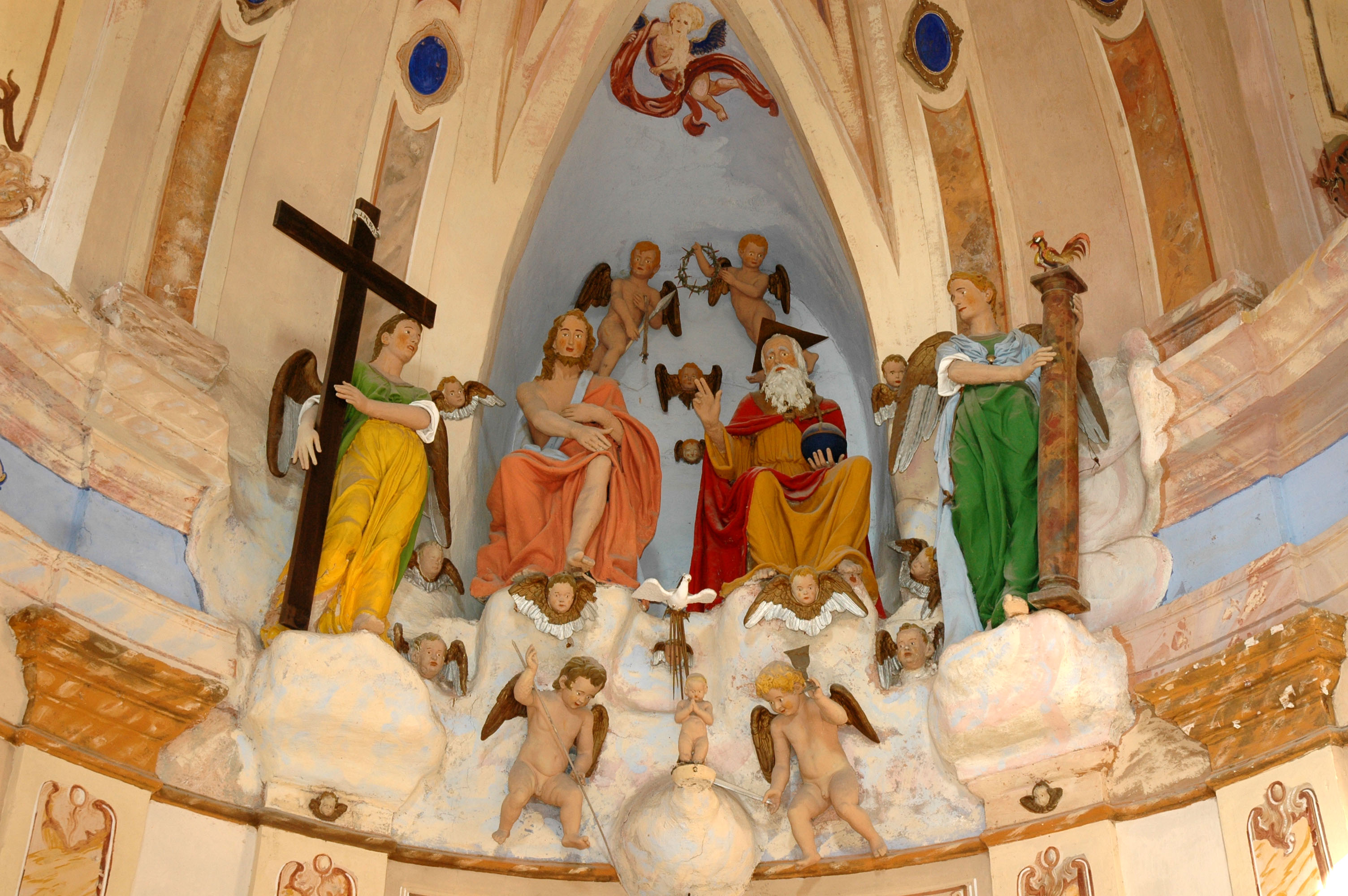
The Conception of Mary

The Sacro Monte di Oropa ("Sacred Mount of Oropa") is a Roman Catholic devotional complex in the province of Biella, Piedmont, northern Italy. It is one of the nine Sacri Monti of Piedmont and Lombardy and is on the UNESCO World Heritage list.

It is a stop-over on the CoEur devotional path.

== Description ==
Construction began in 1617, near the pre-existing sanctuary of Black Virgin of Oropa, one of the oldest in Piedmont and one of the best known in the region of the Alps. The 12 chapels (plus another seven nearby) are united by a devotional path, and inside these chapels scenes from the story of the life of the Virgin Mary are represented. The minute dimensions and expressions of the characters, the shades and colour tones and the vivid, precise settings of the episodes envelop the visitor in a warm atmosphere which grows from one chapel to the other until reaching Paradise (chapel XV – The Crowning of Mary), on the top of the hill, a Baroque work of art by the brothers Giovann and Antonio d'Enrico, animated by 156 modelled figures.

== See also ==
- Santuario di Oropa
- Giardino Botanico di Oropa
