= Biella =

Biella Biela (Piedmontese)
- Comune
- Comune di Biella
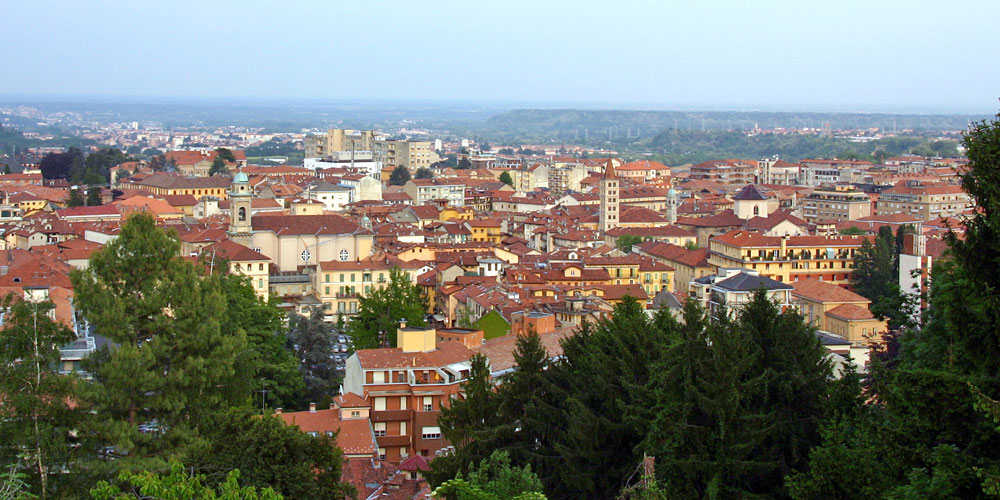
- View of Biella

- Flag Coat of arms

- Location within Italy Location within Piedmont
- Coordinates: 45°34′N 08°04′E
- Country: Italy
- Region: Piedmont
- Province: Biella
- Frazioni: Barazzetto, Chiavazza, Colma, Cossila, Favaro, Lago del Mucrone, Oropa, Pavignano, Vaglio, Vandorno

Government
  - Mayor: Marzio Olivero

Area
  - Total: 46.69 km^{2} (18.03 sq mi)
- Elevation: 420 m (1,380 ft)

Population (2026)
  - Total: 43,356
  - Density: 928.6/km^{2} (2,405/sq mi)
- Demonym: Biellese(i)
- Time zone: UTC+1 (CET)
  - Summer (DST): UTC+2 (CEST)
- Postal code: 13900
- Dialing code: 015
- ISTAT code: 096004
- Patron saint: St. Stephen
- Saint day: December 1 al January 30
- Website: Official website

Biella (Italian: [ˈbjɛlla]; Piedmontese: Biela; Latin: Bugella) is a city and comune (municipality) in the region of Piedmont in northern Italy, the capital of the province of the same name. With a population of 43,356, it is the 12th-largest city in Piedmont. It is located about 80 kilometres (50 miles) northeast of Turin and at about the same distance west-northwest of Milan.

It lies in the foothills of the Alps, in the Bo mountain range near Mt. Mucrone and Camino, an area rich in springs and lakes fed by the glaciers, the heart of the Biellese Alps irrigated by several mountain streams: the Elvo to the west of the town, the Oropa river and the Cervo to the east. Nearby natural and notable tourist attractions include the Zegna Viewpoint, the Bielmonte Ski Resort, Burcina Natural Reserve, and the moors to the south of town. The Sanctuary of Oropa is a site of religious pilgrimages. In 2003, the Sanctuary of Oropa Sacred Mountain of Oropa became a UNESCO World Heritage Site.

Biella is an important wool processing and textile centre. There is a small airport in the nearby comune of Cerrione.

== History ==
The first inhabitants of the area were Ligurians and Celts. This has been ascertained from archaeological finds: they lived near streams and lakes, at first as fishermen and hunters, and later, herders.

A Ligurian people, the Victimuli, fanned out in the plain of Biella (the Bessa) and exploited gold veins near the Elvo, an activity which continued through the early Middle Ages, and even today panning for gold continues as a local hobby.

Tools and necklaces dating from the Bronze Age—or, according to some, Iron Age— attesting to Biella's antiquity, were found in the Burcina Reserve.

=== Middle Ages ===
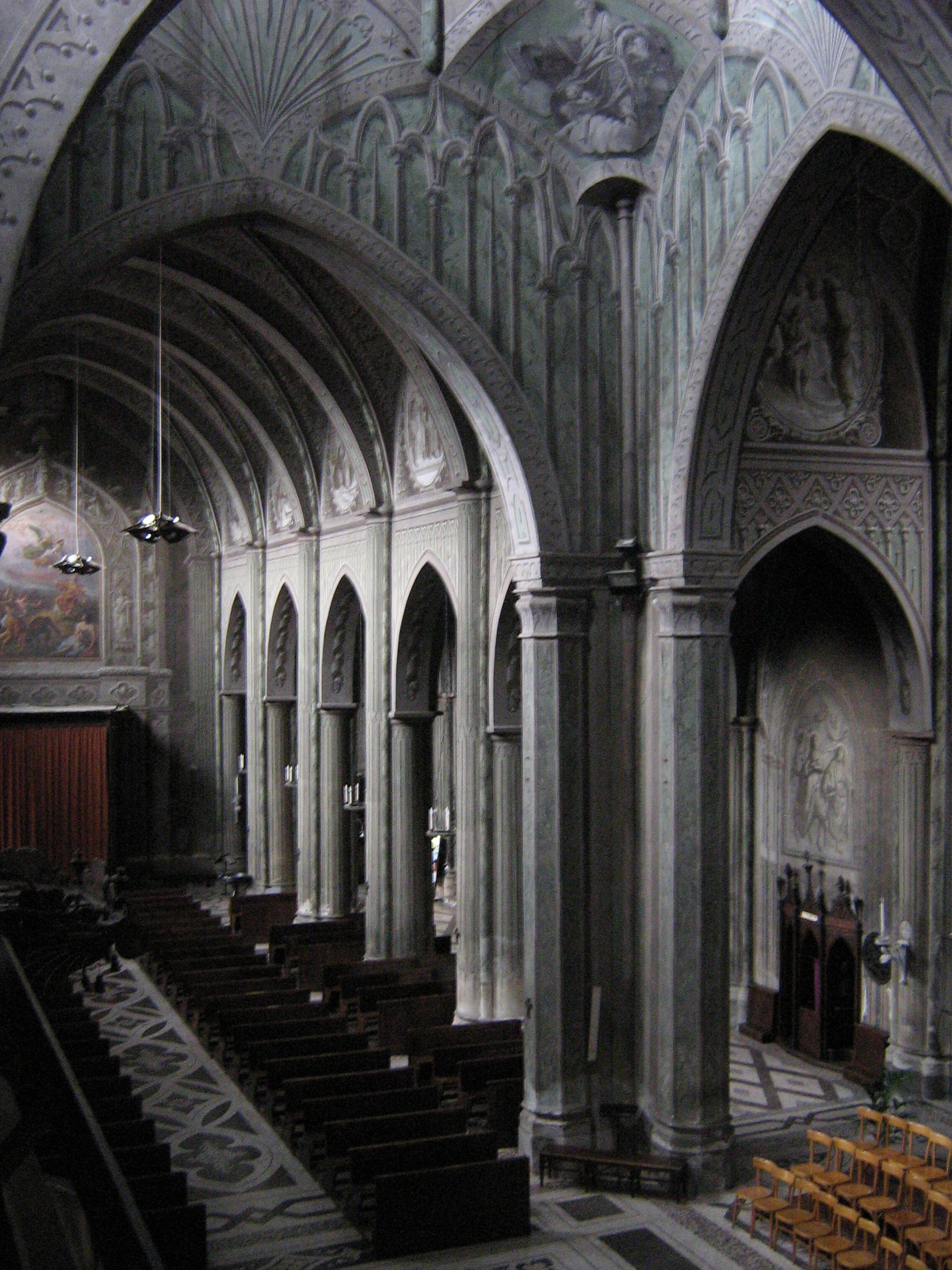
The interior of the cathedral in Biella is a masterpiece of trompe-l'œil

The city's name appears for the first time as Bugella in a document of 826AD, recording the donation of Bugella to Count Busone by Louis the Pious, son of Charlemagne), Holy Roman Emperor; a further document of 882AD records some land transactions of Charles the Fat in favour of the church of Vercelli.

In the 10th century the town was inhabited by Alemanni, Lombards and Franks, who built the first walls as a defence against barbarian invasions. Extant remains from this period include the Lombard Romanesque Baptistry and the adjacent church of S. Stefano, around which the town grew: it is today's cathedral, although the original 5th-century building was demolished in 1872.

On April 12, 1160, Uguccione, bishop of Vercelli, granted important trade privileges to anyone residing on Piazzo hill (elevated section of the city) as an incentive to the establishment of a place of refuge against the warfare between the Guelphs and Ghibellines of Vercelli: this was the birth of the Borgo del Piazzo, site of the handsome public square, the Piazza Cisterna, and a Palace fronting it, the doors of which have stone capitals and terracotta ornaments.

Bishop Uguccione's castle was destroyed in a revolt in 1377 that led to the subjection of Biella, along with its dependent comuni, to the yoke of the House of Savoy.

=== Modern times ===
In the 14th and 15th centuries, the Visconti family competed with Savoy for the possession of the Biella region. The 17th century saw a similar competition between French and Spanish forces, and Biella was actually occupied in 1704; in 1706 Pietro Micca, a Biellese soldier, saved nearby Turin from a siege that would have meant the invasion of Biella by the French as well—but paid for it with his own life.

In 1798 Biella was once again occupied by the French, and after the Battle of Marengo, Biella was formally annexed by France. The Congress of Vienna returned it to Savoy.

In 1859 Biella was besieged by the Austrians but Garibaldi forced an end to the siege, and the town became part of the province of Novara, losing its status as regional capital that it had received in the 17th century from Charles Emmanuel I of Savoy; it was transferred to the province of Vercelli in 1927.

In World War II Biella was the scene of armed resistance.

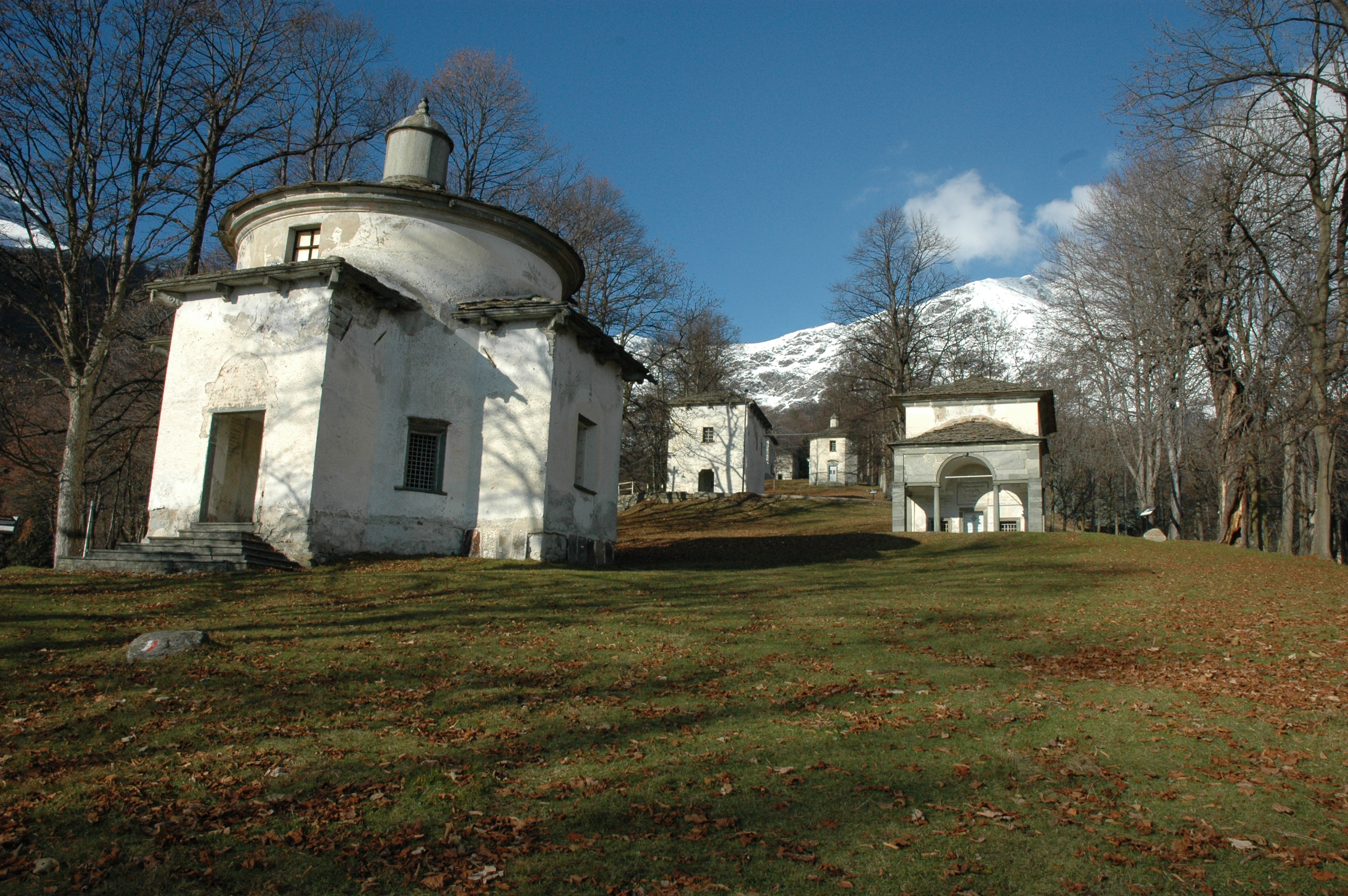
Sacred Mount of Oropa

In 1992, the new province of Biella was formed, separating the territory from the north-western sector of the province of Vercelli.

=== Wool industry ===
In 1245 the statutes of Biella were already referring to the wool workers' and weavers' guilds: hardly surprising given the region's high mountain pastures and copious water supply needed for washing fleece and powering mills. In the 17th and 18th centuries, as elsewhere in Italy, silk was an important industry, and a silk factory was built in the town in 1695. In 1835, however, the town's textile history came round full circle when the same building was put to use as a wool factory with the introduction of mechanical looms, putting Biella at the forefront of modern improvements in the industry. Around 1999/2000, a progressively worse economic crisis in the wool sector forced many local wool mills to close since they could not compete with the prices of imported fabrics and clothing.

== Climate ==
According to the Köppen climate classification, Biella features a humid subtropical climate (Cfa).

Climate data for Biella (2002–2020)
Month	Jan	Feb	Mar	Apr	May	Jun	Jul	Aug	Sep	Oct	Nov	Dec	Year
Mean daily maximum °C (°F)	8.0 (46.4)	9.7 (49.5)	14.5 (58.1)	18.5 (65.3)	22.6 (72.7)	27.5 (81.5)	29.6 (85.3)	28.6 (83.5)	24.2 (75.6)	17.9 (64.2)	12.3 (54.1)	8.6 (47.5)	18.5 (65.3)
Daily mean °C (°F)	4.5 (40.1)	5.8 (42.4)	10.0 (50.0)	13.9 (57.0)	17.7 (63.9)	22.5 (72.5)	24.4 (75.9)	23.7 (74.7)	19.7 (67.5)	14.4 (57.9)	9.2 (48.6)	5.3 (41.5)	14.3 (57.7)
Mean daily minimum °C (°F)	1.0 (33.8)	2.0 (35.6)	5.6 (42.1)	9.4 (48.9)	12.9 (55.2)	17.4 (63.3)	19.3 (66.7)	18.8 (65.8)	15.3 (59.5)	10.8 (51.4)	6.1 (43.0)	2.0 (35.6)	10.0 (50.1)
Average precipitation mm (inches)	40 (1.6)	64 (2.5)	82 (3.2)	136 (5.4)	183 (7.2)	123 (4.8)	96 (3.8)	122 (4.8)	101 (4.0)	120 (4.7)	176 (6.9)	71 (2.8)	1,314 (51.7)
Average precipitation days	4	5	7	10	12	10	7	9	7	8	8	5	92
Source: Climi e viaggi

== Demographics ==
Historical population
Year	Pop.	±%
1861	13,873	—
1871	17,240	+24.3%
1881	20,690	+20.0%
1901	25,795	+24.7%
1911	28,982	+12.4%
1921	32,355	+11.6%
1931	36,935	+14.2%
1936	38,115	+3.2%
1951	42,791	+12.3%
1961	50,209	+17.3%
1971	54,076	+7.7%
1981	53,714	−0.7%
1991	48,324	−10.0%
2001	45,740	−5.3%
2011	43,818	−4.2%
2021	42,783	−2.4%
Source: ISTAT

As of 2026, the population is 43,356, of which 47.9% are male, and 52.1% are female. Minors make up 12.3% of the population, and seniors make up 29.6%.

=== Immigration ===
As of 2025, of the known countries of birth of 42,402 residents, the most numerous are: Italy (36,587 – 86.3%), Morocco (1,316 – 3.1%), Romania (679 – 1.6%), Philippines (400 – 0.9%), Albania (248 – 0.6%), Brazil (241 – 0.6%).

Foreign population by country of birth (2025)
Country of birth	Population
Morocco	1,316
Romania	679
Philippines	400
Ukraine	267
Albania	248
Brazil	241
Pakistan	215
Nigeria	213
Argentina	188
China	178
Peru	143
Dominican Republic	120
France	119
Russia	103
Tunisia	99

== Culture ==
Biella is the home of Citta dell'arte (City of the Arts) - Fondazione Pistoletto. In 1994, Italian artist Michelangelo Pistoletto began Progetto Arte, whose aim was to unify the artistic, creative, and social-economic aspects (e.g. fashion, theatre, design, etc.). In 1996, he founded City of Arts/Citta dell'arte – Fondazione Pistoletto in a formally unused textile factory near Biella, as a centre supporting and researching creative resources, producing innovative ideas and possibilities. The Citta dell'arte is divided into different Uffici/Offices (work, education, communications, art, nutrition, politics, spirituality, and economics).

== Main sights ==
- Biella Cathedral
- Biella Baptistery in romanesque style (10th-11th century), annexed to the cathedral, housing 13th-century frescoes
- Giardino Botanico di Oropa, a botanical garden
- Sacro Monte and sanctuary of Oropa
- Biella Synagogue
- Renaissance church of San Sebastiano (1504)
- Oasi Zegna, a natural preserve

== Main businesses ==
- Cerruti 1881 (wear)
- Ermenegildo Zegna (wear)
- Vitale Barberis Canonico (wear)
- Fila (sportswear)
- Drago Lanificio in Biella (luxury fabrics)
- Banca Sella (bank)
- Menabrea (beer)

== Transport ==
Biella San Paolo Railway Station, shared by the Biella–Novara (opened in 1939) and Biella–Santhià railway lines (opened in 1856), is served by interregional and long-distance trains operated by Trenitalia under the service contract stipulated with the Piedmont Region.

In the past, there was also the Biella Chiavazza station, located on the Biella–Novara line and later closed to service, as well as the old Biella station in Piazza Vittorio Veneto, the former terminus of the railway to Santhià, which was demolished in 1958.

The Biella funicular connects a lower station on Via Curiel, in the city's Biella Piano quarter, with an upper station on Via Avogadro in the city's medieval Biella Piazzo quarter. Currently suspended indefinitely since September 2025 due to frequent breakdowns, technical issues, and failed inspections, it has been replaced by services operated by line buses.

Biella-Cerrione Airport in Cerrione serves Biella but does not operate any commercial flights to and from the airport. The nearest passengers are Turin Airport, Milan's Malpensa Airport, Linate Airport and Bergamo Airport.

== Twin towns and sister cities ==
Biella is twinned with:

- Kiryū, Japan
- Arequipa, Peru
- Tourcoing, France
- Weihai, China

== Notable people ==
- Leone Azzali (1880-1963), politician who represented the Italian Republican Party in the Constituent Assembly of Italy in 1948.
- Virginia Angiola Borrino (1880–1965), physician who was the first woman to serve as head of a University Pediatric Ward in Italy
- Claudio Botosso (born 1958), actor
- Giovanni Bracco (1908–1968), racing driver
- Antonio Brivio (1905–1995), bobsledder and racing driver
- Tavo Burat (1932–2009), teacher and journalist
- Nino Cerruti (1930–2022), stylist, designer, and businessman
- Mario Gariazzo (1930–2002), Italian screenwriter
- Alberto Gilardino (born 1982), Italian FIFA World Cup Winner
- Piero Liatti (born 1962), rally driver
- Pier Giorgio Morandi (born 1958), Italian oboist and conductor
- Ugo Nespolo, Italian painter and sculptor
- Gabriele Piana (born 1986), racing driver
- Michelangelo Pistoletto (born 1933), artist
- Elvina Ramella (1927–2007), operatic soprano
