= Punta Gran Gabe =

Mountain in Italy

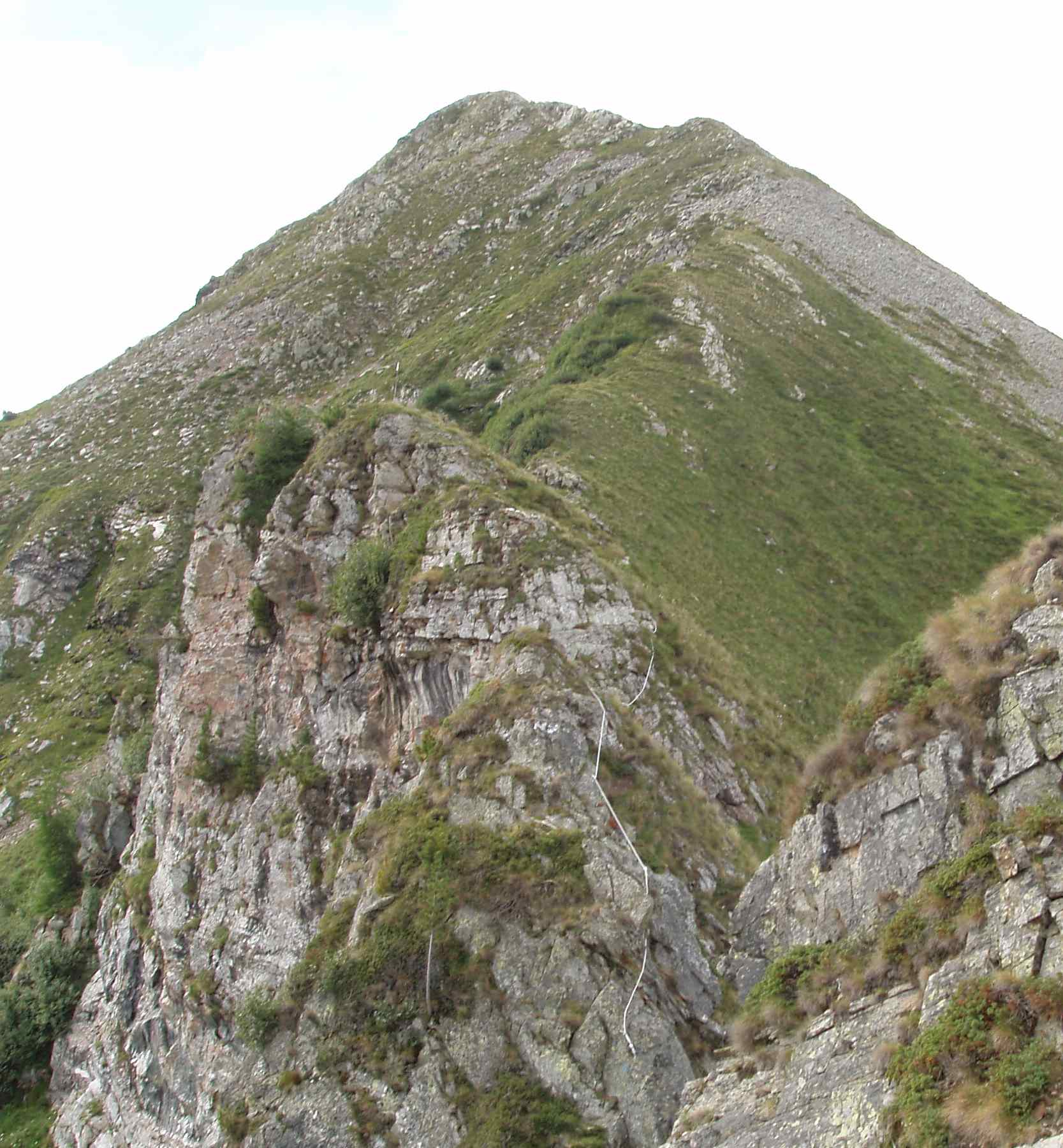

Highest point
- Elevation: 2,328 m (7,638 ft)
- Coordinates: 45°39′15″N 7°55′38″E

Geography
- Location: Piedmont/Aosta Valley, Italy
- Parent range: Alpi Biellesi

Punta Gran Gabe is a mountain of the Biellese Alps, in north-western Italy, with an elevation of 2,328 meters.

== Details ==
The mountain lies on the border between the Lys Valley, in the Aosta Valley, and the Cervo Valley, in the Piedmontese province of Biella. The Colle della Gragliasca divides it from the nearby Punta della Gragliasca (the names of these two peaks are exchanged in some maps), and an unnamed gap separates it from Punta Lac-Long.

The Aostan side of the mountain lies within the Mont Mars Natural Reserve. The peak, which is a tripoint between the borders of the municipalities of Sagliano Micca, Andorno Micca and Fontainemore, can be reached through a difficult hiking path starting from Pillaz, a hamlet of Fontainemore (as well as from Rosazza), through the Colle della Gragliasca.
