= Monte Mucrone =

Mountain in Italy

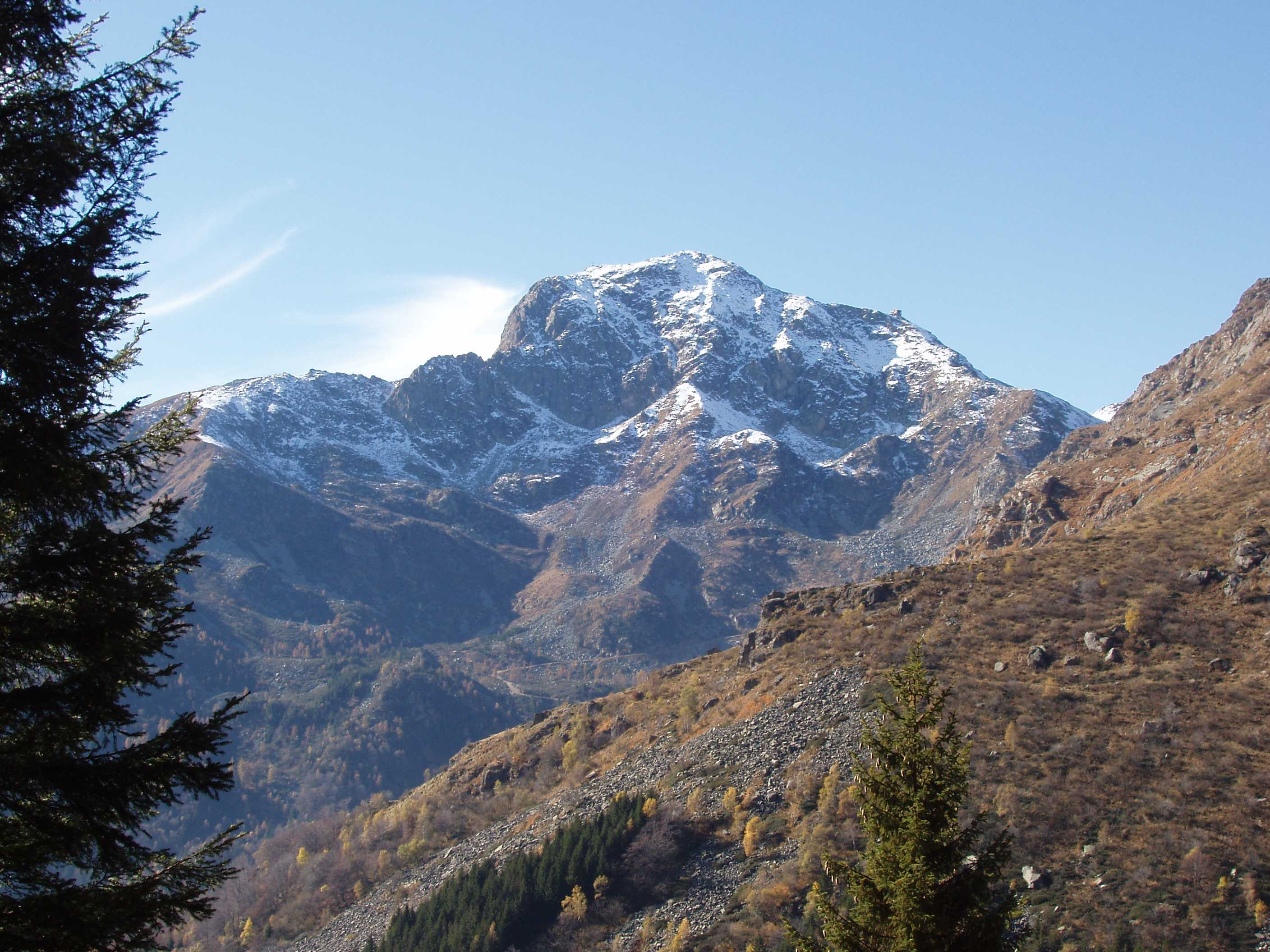
- View from Monte Becco slopes.

Highest point
- Elevation: 2,335 m (7,661 ft)
- Prominence: 309 m (1,014 ft)
- Listing: Alpine mountains 2000-2499 m
- Coordinates: 45°37′13″N 7°56′41″E

Geography
- Location within Alps
- Location: Province of Biella, Italy
- Parent range: Alpi Biellesi

Climbing
- Easiest route: Hiking from the Oropa cableway upper station

Monte Mucrone (or simply Mucrone) is an Alpine mountain of Piedmont (NW Italy).

== Geography ==
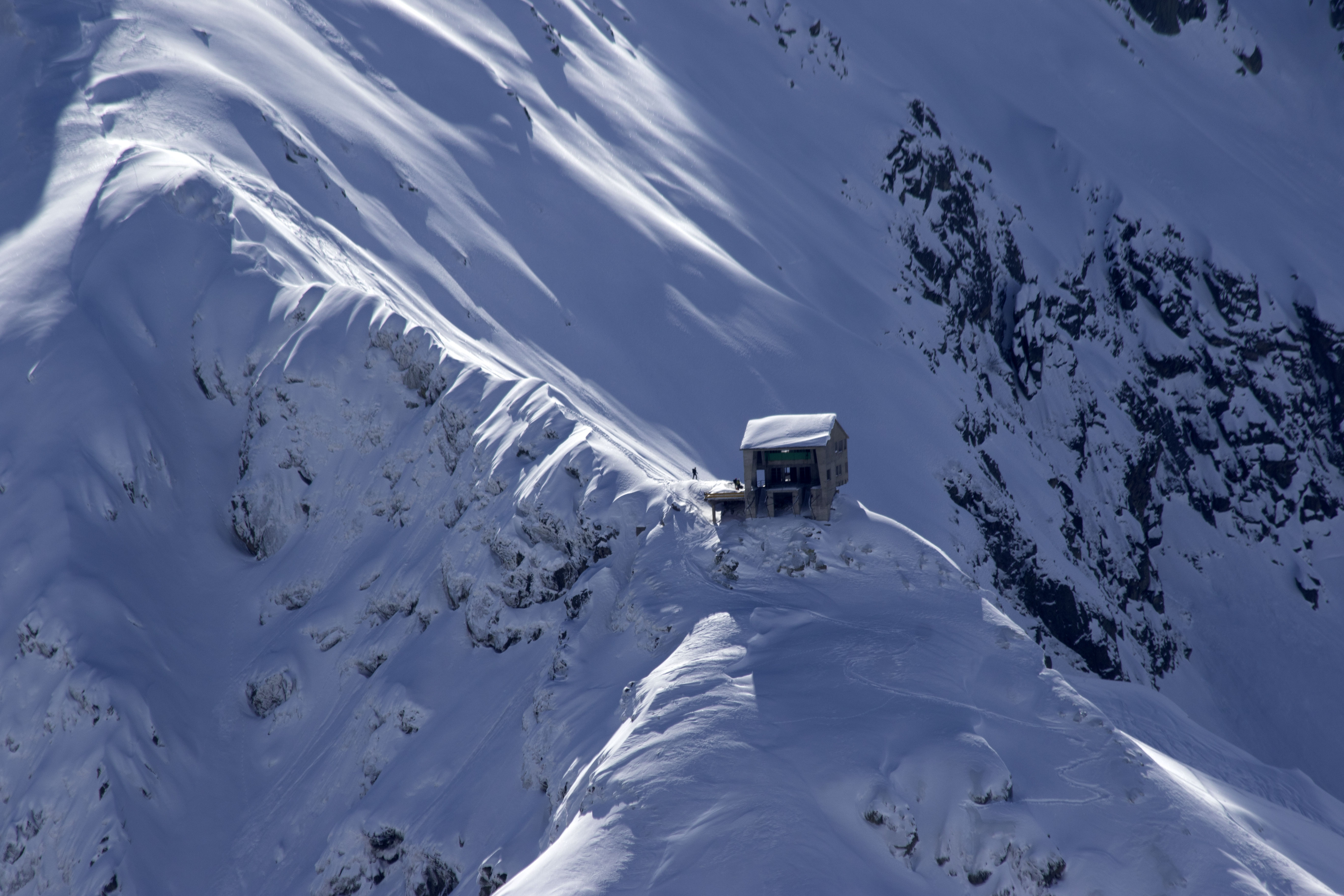
NW subsummit in winter

The mountain belongs to the Biellese Alps, a sub-range of Pennine Alps; the Bocchetta del Lago, a pass at 2,026 m, divides it from the rest of the chain. The Mucrone is located between Elvo and Cervo valleys, and belongs to the Province of Biella. Administratively its main summit is the tripoint at which the borders of the municipalities of Biella, Sordevolo and Pollone meet. It visually dominates the Sanctuary of Oropa. On a subsummit at 2,302 m stands a huge metal cross. On a second subsummit, NW of the main elevation, stands the upper station of an old branch of the Oropa cableway, dismantled in 1982.

=== SOIUSA classification ===
According to the SOIUSA (International Standardized Mountain Subdivision of the Alps) the mountain can be classified in the following way:

- main part = Western Alps
- major sector = North Western Alps
- section = Pennine Alps
- subsection = Southern Valsesia Alps
- supergroup = Alpi Biellesi
- group = Catena Tre Vescovi - Mars
- subgroup =
- code = I/B-9.IV-A.1

== Access to the summit ==
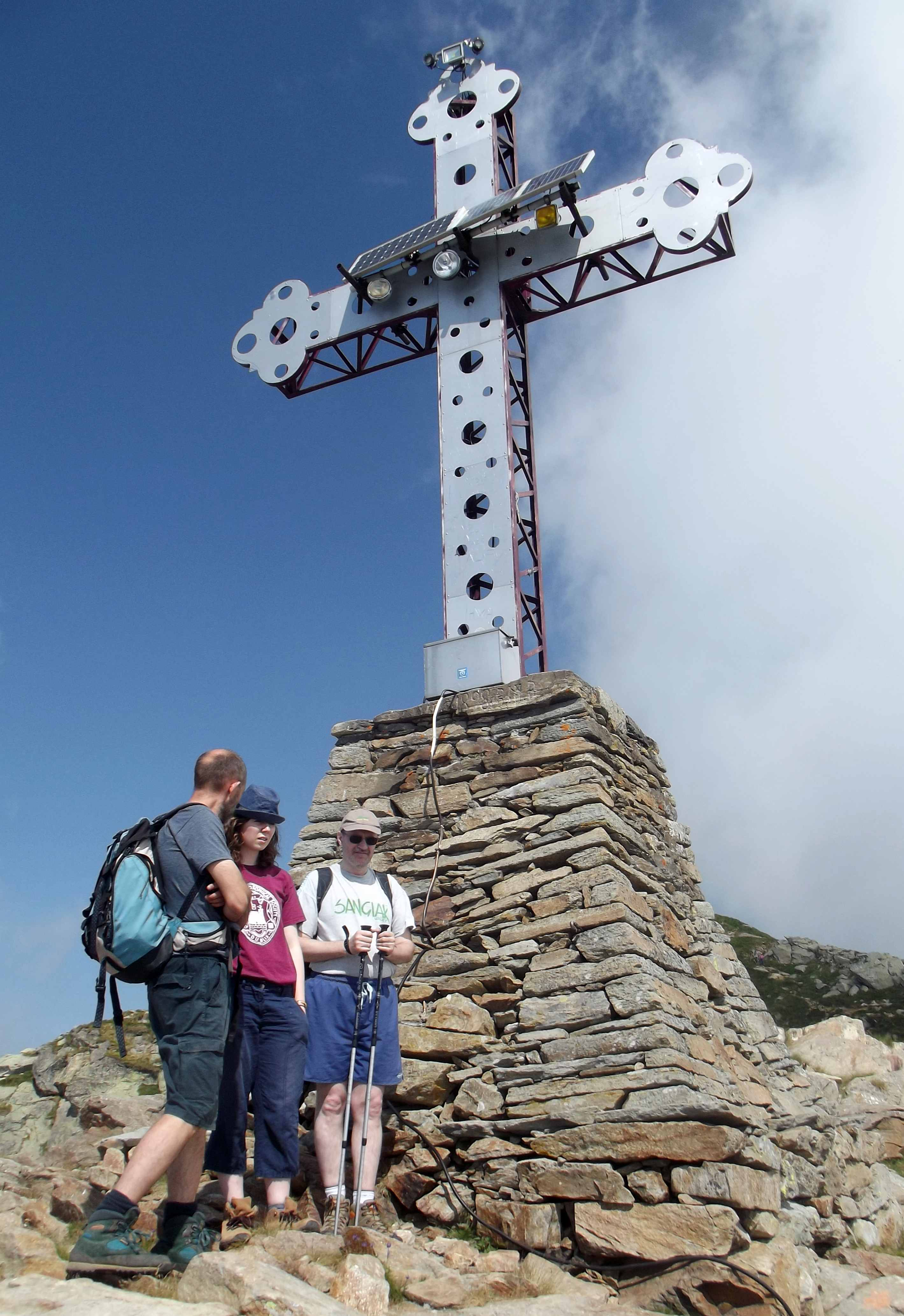
Summit cross.

The easiest route for the Mucrone summit is a waymarked footpath which starts from Oropa Sport (the Oropa cableway upper station); the hike flanks at first a small lake, then reaches the Bocchetta del Lago and from there the summit, climbing the NW ridge of the mountain.

== Mountain huts ==
Nearby Oropa Sport, at 1,850 m, is located Rifugio Rosazza, a permanent mountain hut.

== Maps ==
- Italian official cartography (Istituto Geografico Militare - IGM); on-line version: www.pcn.minambiente.it
- Provincia di Biella cartography: Carta dei sentieri della Provincia di Biella, 1:25.00 scale, 2004; on line version: webgis.provincia.biella.it
- Carta dei sentieri e dei rifugi, 1:50.000 scale, nr. 9 Ivrea, Biella e Bassa Valle d'Aosta, Istituto Geografico Centrale - Torino
