= Monte Cresto =

Mountain in Italy

Monte Cresto Mont Crest
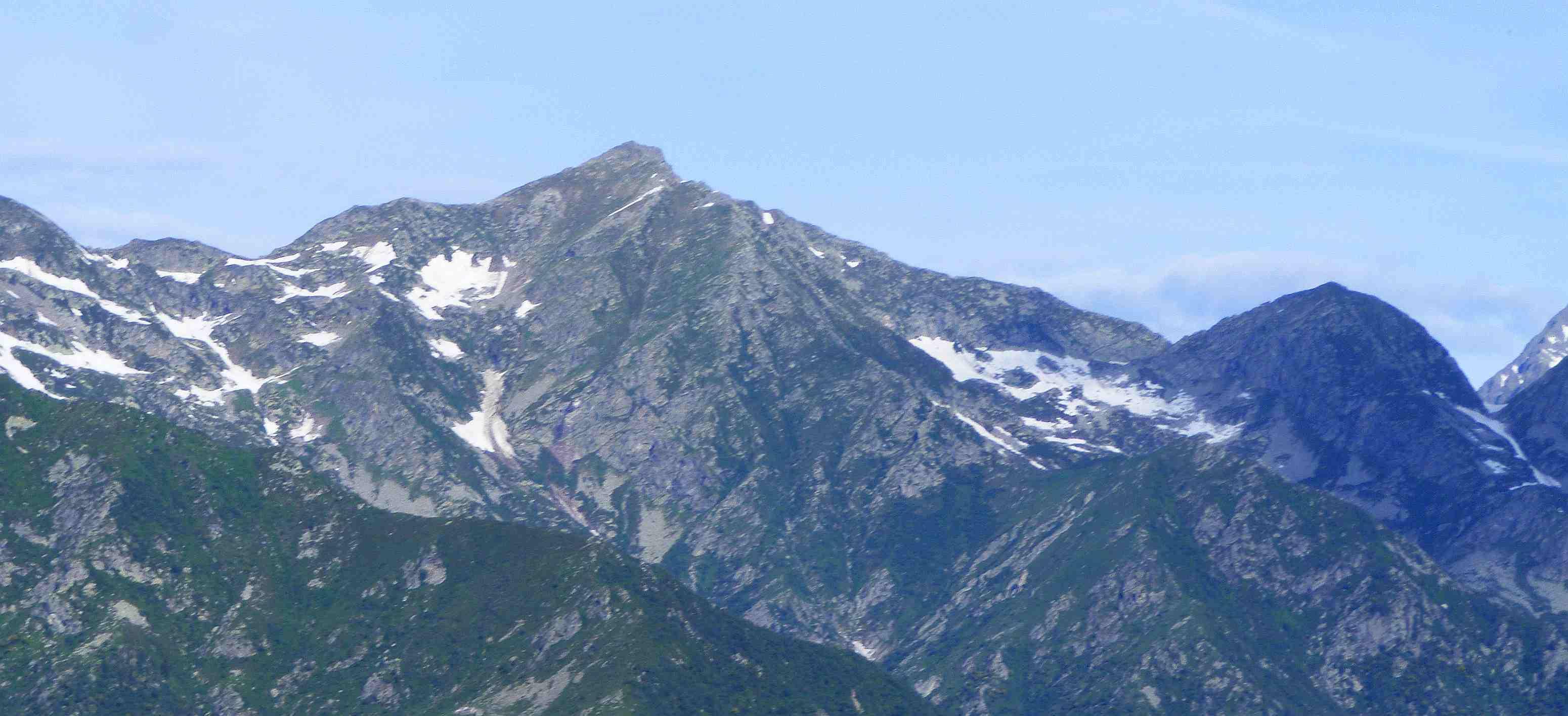

Highest point
- Elevation: 2,548 m (8,360 ft)
- Prominence: 335 m (1,099 ft)
- Parent peak: Monte Mars
- Listing: Alpine mountains 2500–2999 m
- Coordinates: 45°40′54″N 7°54′36″E

Geography
- Location within Alps
- Location: Piedmont / Aosta Valley, Italy
- Parent range: Alpi Biellesi

Monte Cresto (French: Mont Crest) (2,548 m) is the third highest peak of the Province of Biella (Piedmont, NW Italy) after Monte Mars (2,600 m) and Monte Bo (2,556 m).

== Geography ==
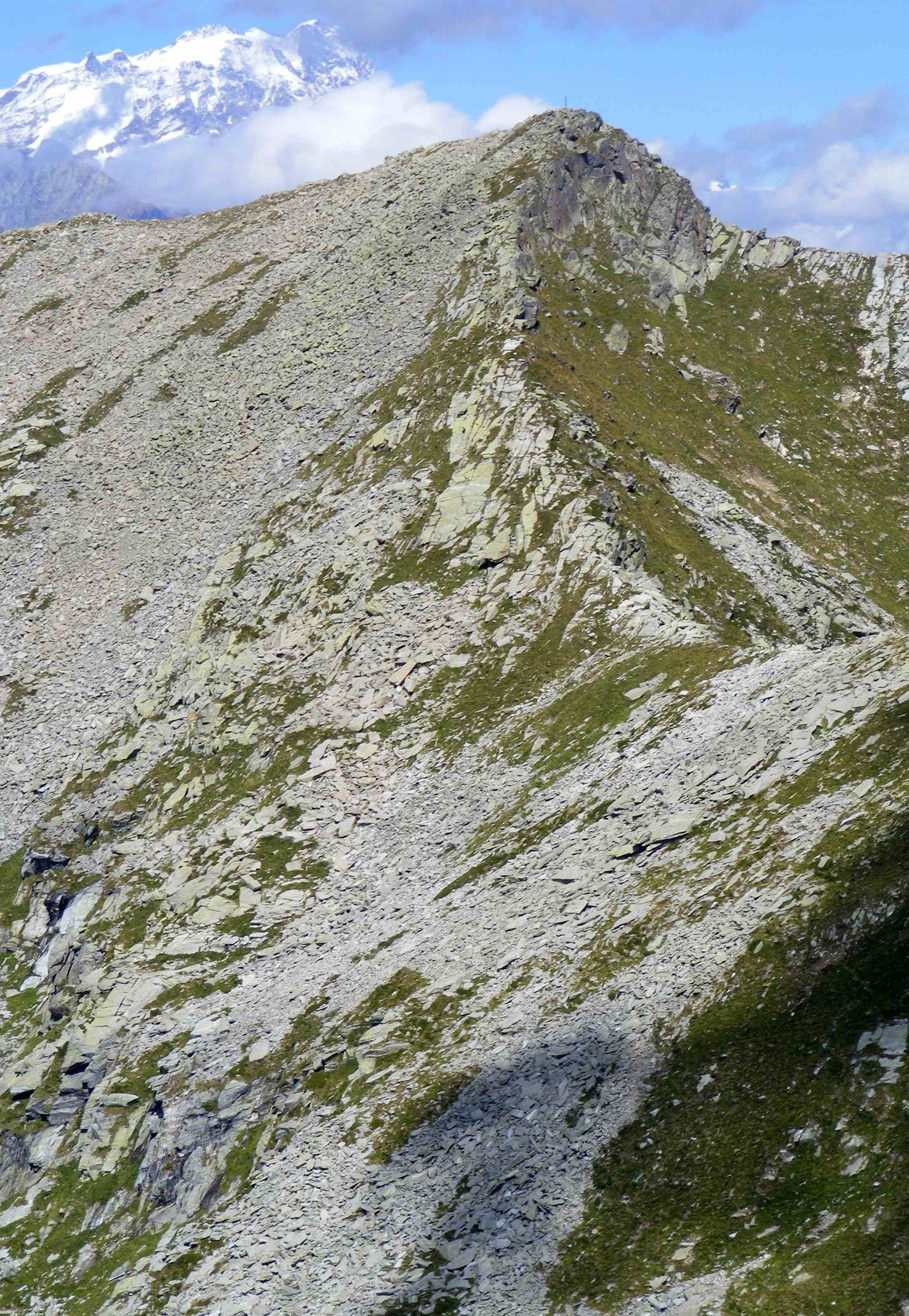
The mountain seen from South (Monte Pietra Bianca)

The mountain is located on the water divide between the Lys Valley (Aosta Valley) and the Cervo Valley (Province of Biella).

Administratively is divided between the comunes of Issime (Aosta Valley, western faces) and an exclave of the Piedmontese comune of Sagliano Micca (Eastern faces).

== Access to the summit ==
It can be ascended following the water divide starting from Piedicavallo either from the south, passing through the Colle del Lupo (literally Wolf's pass, 2,342 m) or from the north, passing by Colle della Vecchia (Old Woman's pass, 2,185 m).

A classical climbing route which reaches the summit starts from Rifugio della Vecchia and is rated PD in the IFAS system.

== Mountain huts ==
- Rifugio della Vecchia (1,872 m)

=== SOIUSA classification ===
According to the SOIUSA (International Standardized Mountain Subdivision of the Alps) the mountain can be classified in the following way:

- main part = Western Alps
- major sector = North Western Alps
- section = Pennine Alps
- subsection = Southern Valsesia Alps
- supergroup = Alpi Biellesi
- group = Catena Tre Vescovi - Mars
- code = II/B-9.IV-A.1

== Maps ==
- Italian official cartography (Istituto Geografico Militare - IGM); on-line version: www.pcn.minambiente.it
- Provincia di Biella cartography: Carta dei sentieri della Provincia di Biella, 1:25.00 scale, 2004; on line version: webgis.provincia.biella.it
- Carta dei sentieri e dei rifugi, 1:50.000 scale, nr. 9 Ivrea, Biella e Bassa Valle d'Aosta, Istituto Geografico Centrale - Torino
