= Monte Pietra Bianca =

Mountain in Italy

Monte Pietra Bianca Mont des Pierres-Blanches
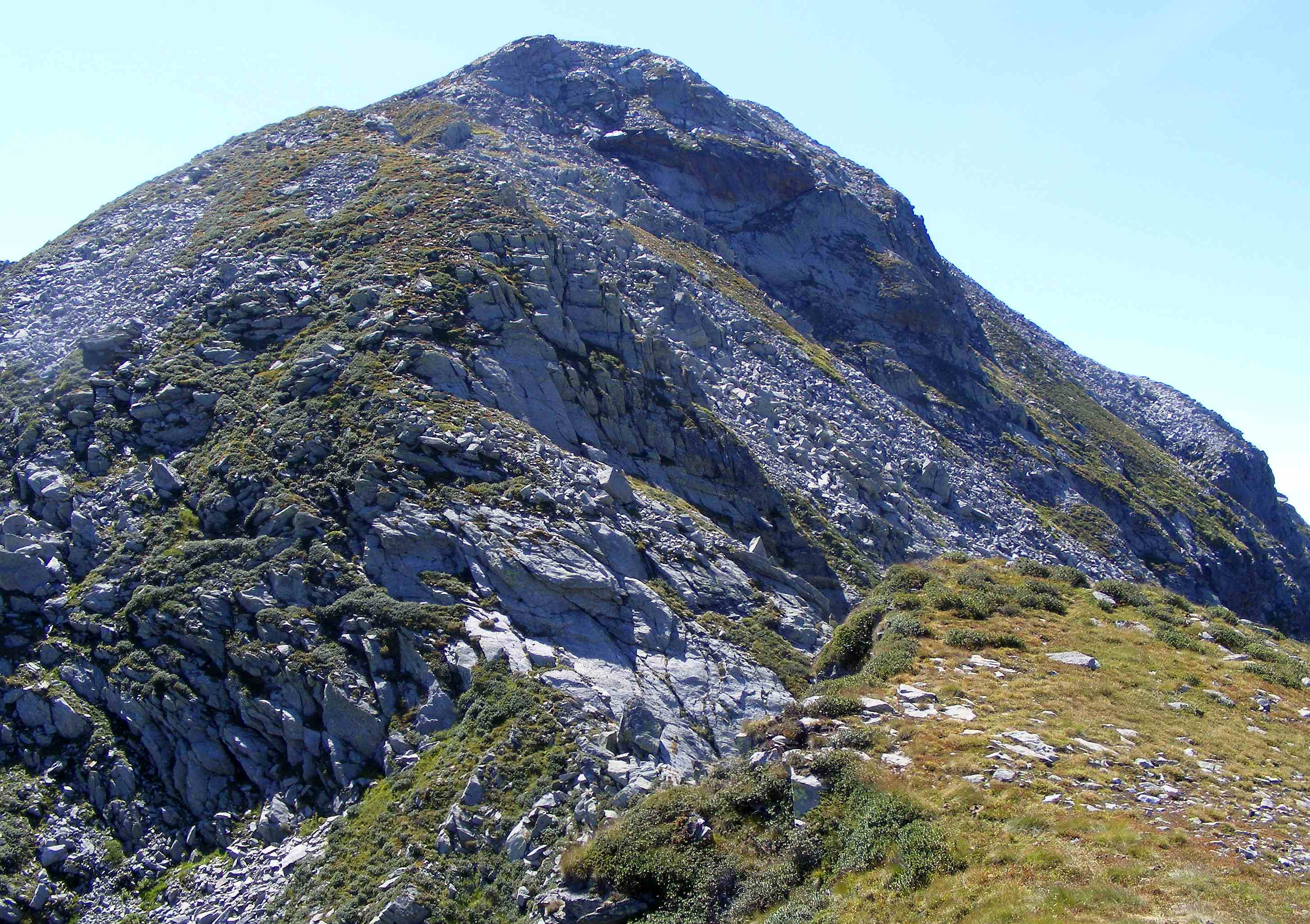

Highest point
- Elevation: 2,490 m (8,170 ft)
- Prominence: 151 m (495 ft)
- Coordinates: 45°40′14″N 7°54′40″E

Geography
- Location: Piedmont/Aosta Valley, Italy
- Parent range: Alpi Biellesi

Monte Pietra Bianca (mont des Pierres-Blanches in French) is a mountain of the Biellese Alps, in north-western Italy, with an elevation of 2,490 meters.

== Details ==
The mountain lies between the Lys Valley (Aosta Valley) and the Cervo Valley (province of Biella, Piedmont); its peak is a tripoint between the border of the municipalities of Sagliano Micca, Issime and Fontainemore.

Three ridges depart from the peak: to the north, one connects it to Monte Cresto; to the south, one connects it to the Punta della Gragliasca; to the west, one descends towards the Lys Valley.

A cairn has been built on the peak, which can be reached on a hiking path from Piedicavallo.
