= Monte Tovo (Biellese Alps) =

Mountain in Italy

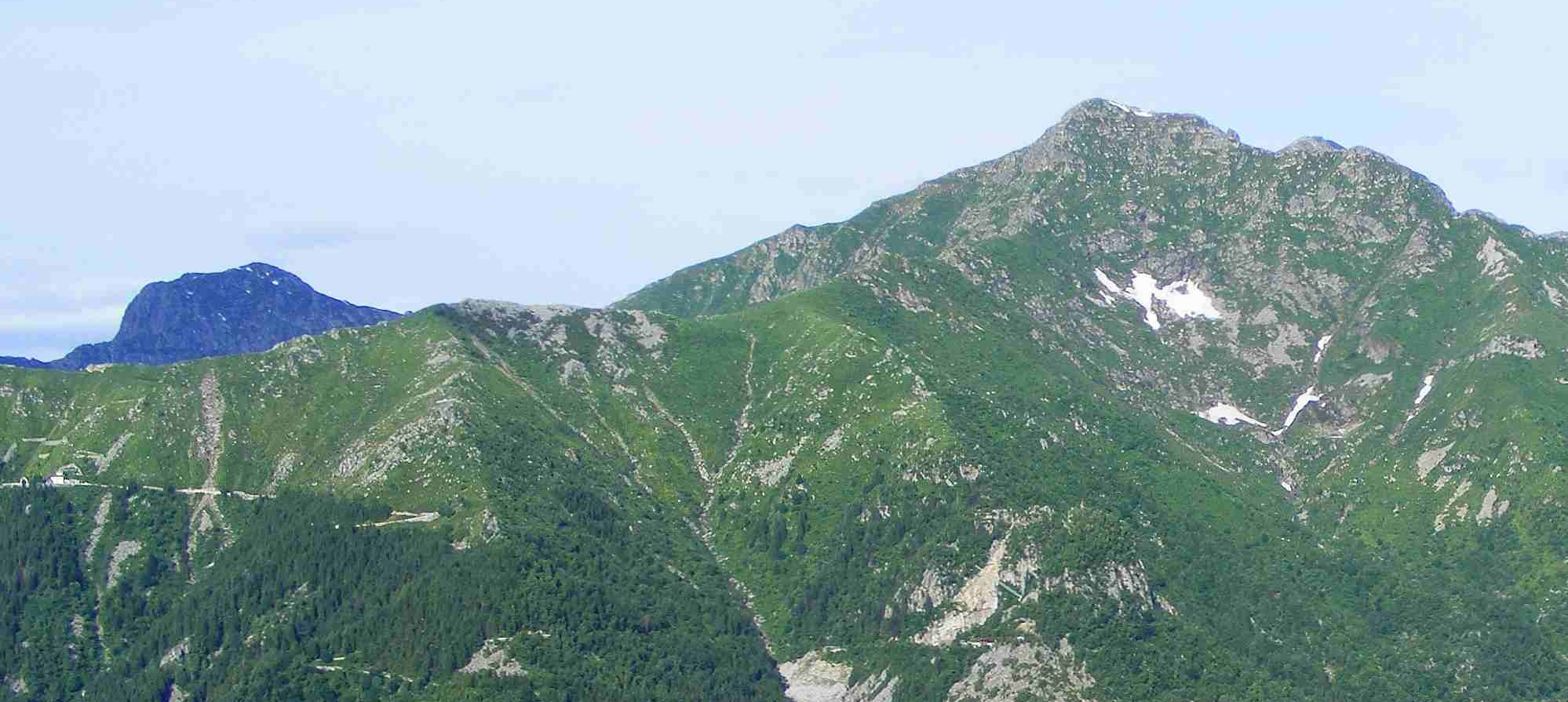
- Monte Tovo seen from Cima del Bonom

Highest point
- Elevation: 2,230 m (7,320 ft)
- Prominence: 192 m (630 ft)

Geography
- Location: Piedmont, Italy
- Parent range: Biellese Alps

Monte Tovo is a mountain of Piedmont, Italy, with an elevation of 2,230 metres (7,316 ft). It is located in the Biellese Alps, in the Province of Biella.

== Details ==
It lies in the territory of the municipalities of Biella, Campiglia Cervo and Andorno Micca, between the Valle Cervo and the valley of Oropa; it is separated from nearby Monte Camino by the Bocchetta della Finestra (2,043 m).

The peak can be reached from Oropa by hiking paths or the via ferrata "Nito Staich". A sky race, Vertikaltovo, takes place on its southern side every year.
