= Punta del Cravile =

Italian mountain

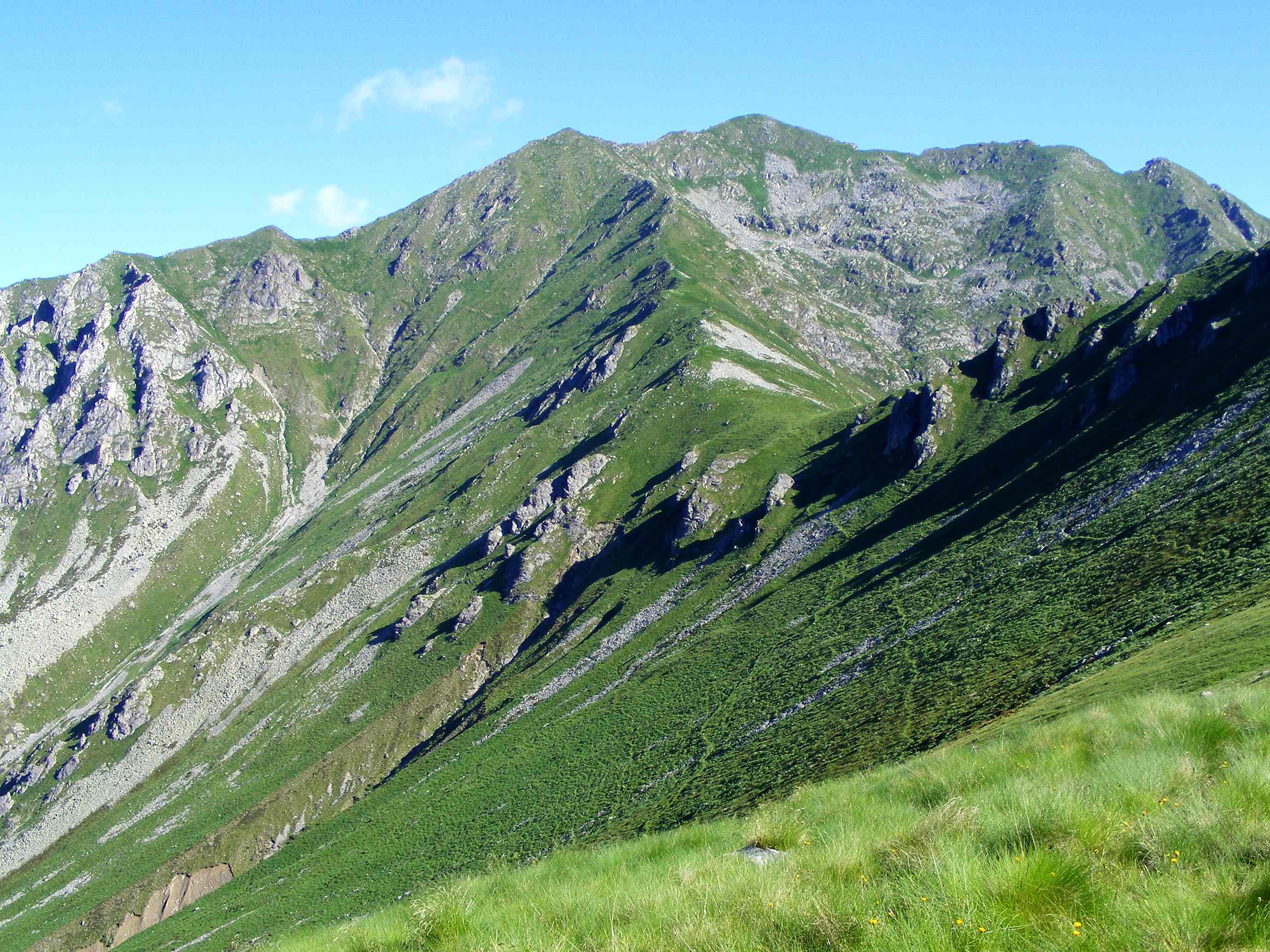
- Punta del Cravile seen from Bassa del Campo

Highest point
- Elevation: 2,384 m (7,822 ft)

Geography
- Location: Piedmont, Italy
- Parent range: Biellese Alps

The Punta del Cravile is a mountain of Piedmont, Italy, with an elevation of 2,384 metres (7,822 ft). It is located in the Biellese Alps, in the Province of Biella.

The peak offers a panoramic vantage point over the Valsessera and Cervo valleys, making it a prominent destination for alpine hiking and mountaineering within the Pennine Alps range.<ref>{{Cite web |title=Punta del Cravile - Mountain Peak |url=https://www.peakvisor.com |publisher=PeakVisor |access-date=2026-01-22}}</ref>

It lies between the Val Sessera and the Valle Cervo, and its peak marks a tripoint between the territory of the municipalities of Piedicavallo, Bioglio and Valdilana (formerly Valle Mosso). Part of the Monte Bo massif, it has four main ridges: one joins it to the nearby Cima delle Guardie to the south; another one joins it to Cima d’Ala, Punta del Manzo and Monte Bo to the north-west; a third one joins it to the Bonda Lansona to the east; and the fourth one divides the Vallone Concabbia from Valdescola, two secondary valleys.

The Punta del Cravile has two peaks, about one hundred meters apart; the northern peak is 2,384 meters high, whereas the southern peak is a meter lower. A cairn has been built on the southern peak.

The peak can be reached via a hiking path from the Cima del Bonom or from the Valsessera or the hamlet of Forgengo (part of Campiglia Cervo) through the Bassa della Cavallina.
