= Monte Tovo =

Monte Tovo may refer to the following mountains:

- Monte Tovo (Biellese Alps), a mountain in Piedmont, Italy
- Monte Tovo (Pennine Alps), a mountain in Piedmont, Italy
