= Monte I Gemelli =

Mountain in Italy

Monte I Gemelli Les Jumeaux de Mologne
- Gemelli di Mologna
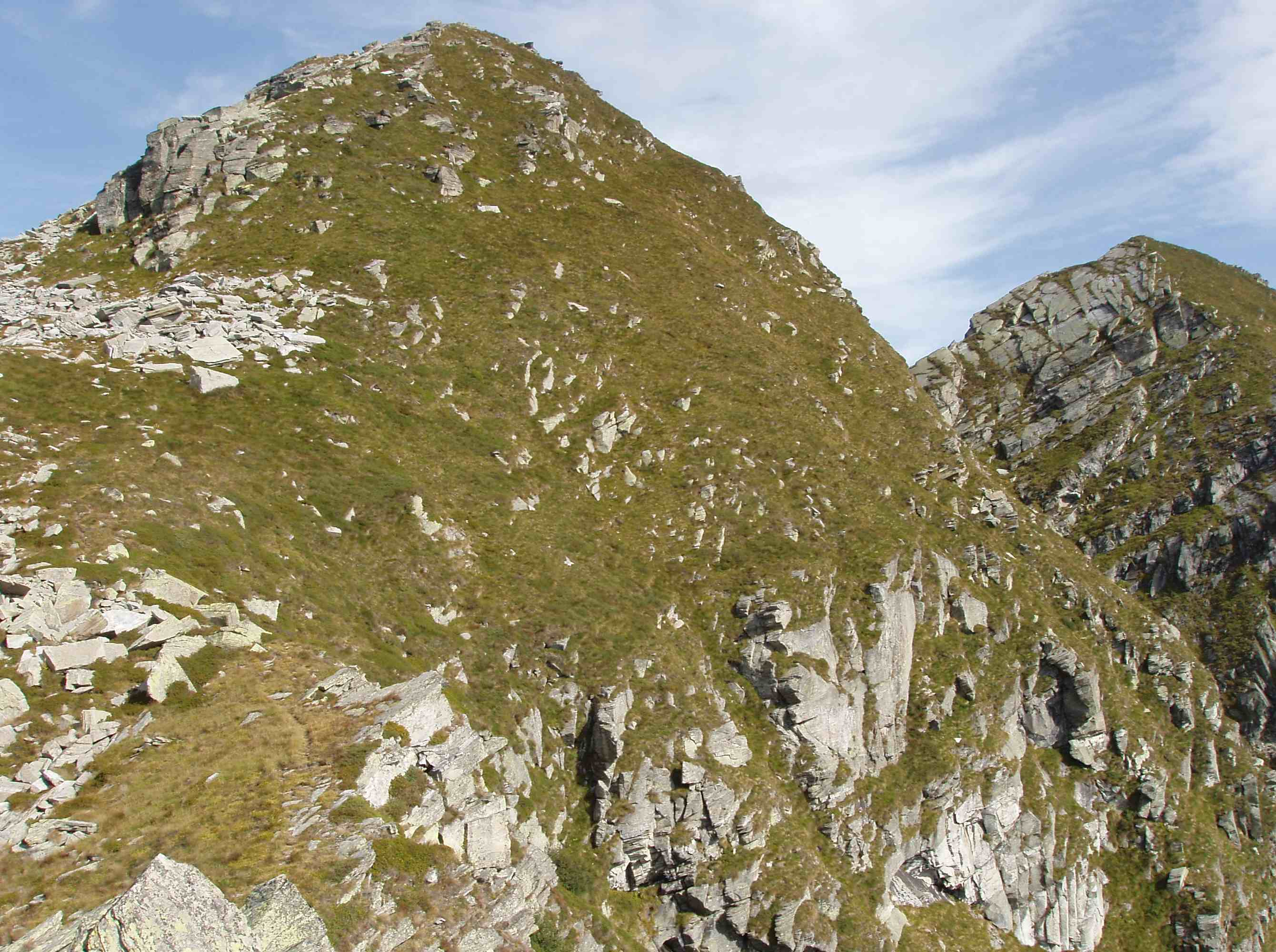

Highest point
- Elevation: 2,476 m (8,123 ft)
- Prominence: 120 m (390 ft)
- Coordinates: 45°43′03″N 7°55′43″E

Geography
- Location within Alps
- Location: Province of Biella / Aosta Valley, Italy
- Parent range: Alpi Biellesi

Climbing
- Easiest route: Hiking from the Piedicavallo

The Monte I Gemelli (or Gemelli di Mologna; French: Les Jumeaux de Mologne) is an Alpine mountain located between Aosta Valley and Piedmont (NW Italy).

== Toponymy ==
Literally Italian: Gemelli di Mologna and French: Jumeaux de Mologne means Twins of Mologna/Mologne, where the Mologna/Mologne is a stream tributary of the river Cervo. Twins refers to the fact that the mountain has a subsummit almost of the same elevation of its main summit.

== Geography ==
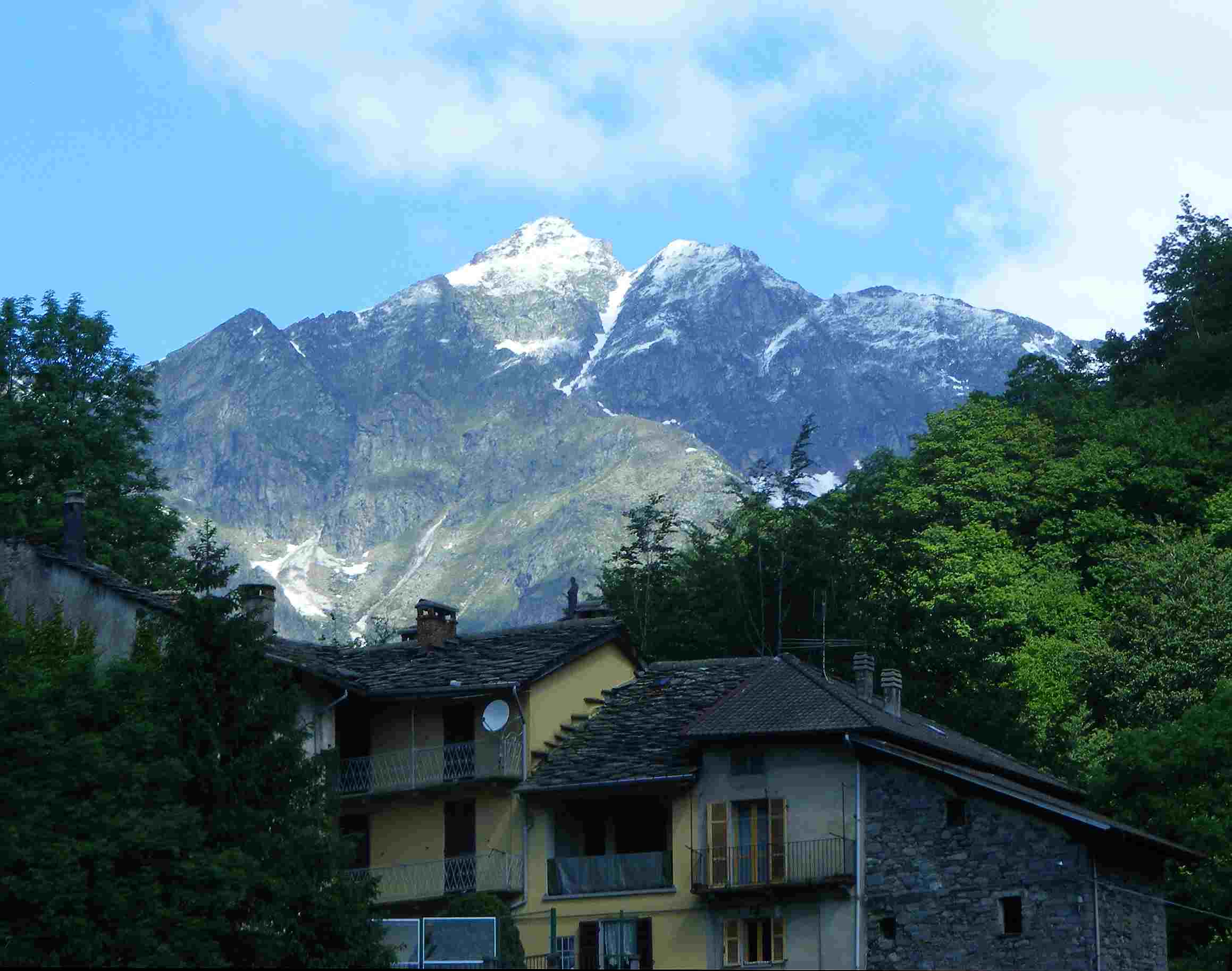
The mountain from Valmosca (Campiglia Cervo)

The mountain belongs to the Biellese Alps, a sub-range of Pennine Alps; the Colle della Mologna Grande, a pass at 2,356 m, divides it from the Punta Tre Vescovi, and the Colle della Mologna Piccola (2,208 m) from the nearby Punte Serange. The Gemelli di Mologna are located between the Lys and the Cervo valleys.

=== SOIUSA classification ===
According to the SOIUSA (International Standardized Mountain Subdivision of the Alps) the mountain can be classified in the following way:

- main part = Western Alps
- major sector = North Western Alps
- section = Pennine Alps
- subsection = Southern Valsesia Alps
- supergroup = Alpi Biellesi
- group = Catena Tre Vescovi - Mars
- code = I/B-9.IV-A.1

== Access to the summit ==
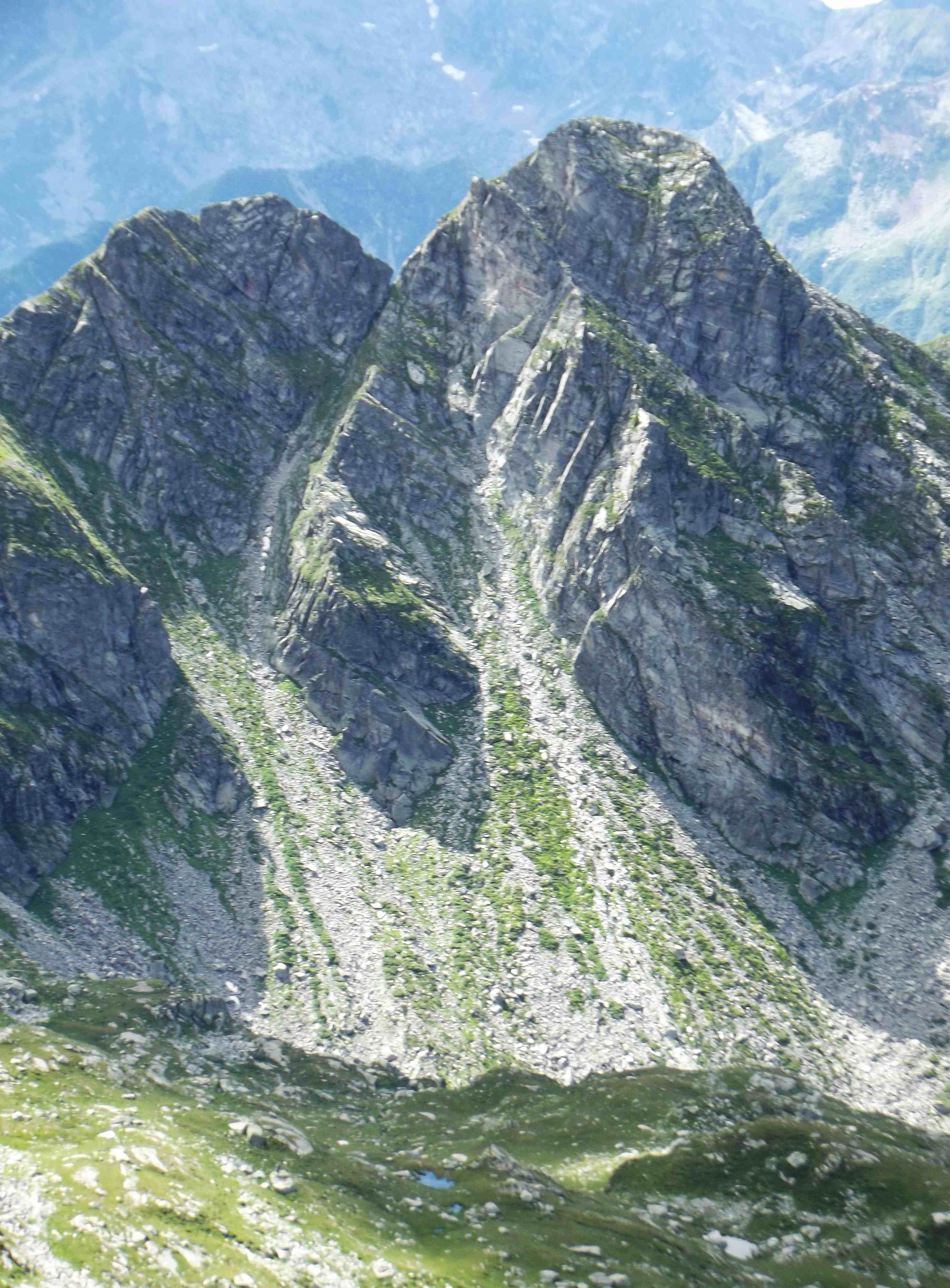
Aosta valley face of the mountain as seen from the Punta/Pointe Lazoney.

On the Gemelli di Mologna were opened some of the best known climbing routes of the Biellese.

The hiking route follows the ridge connecting the summit with the Italian: Colle della Mologna Piccola / French: col de la Petite Mologne; this mountain pass can be easily reached by a large and stone paved footpath from Piedicavallo or from the Lys Valley. On the Cervo-Lys water divide also runs the Alta Via delle Alpi Biellesi, a long semi-alpinistic itinerary.

== Mountain huts ==
- Rifugio Rivetti

== Maps ==
- Italian official cartography (Istituto Geografico Militare - IGM); on-line version: www.pcn.minambiente.it
- Provincia di Biella cartography: Carta dei sentieri della Provincia di Biella, 1:25.00 scale, 2004; on line version: webgis.provincia.biella.it
- Carta dei sentieri e dei rifugi, 1:50.000 scale, nr. 9 Ivrea, Biella e Bassa Valle d'Aosta, Istituto Geografico Centrale - Torino

== Bibliography ==
- Giancarlo Regis, Renza Piana Regis (1981). Nuova guida alle Alpi biellesi (in Italian). Biella: libreria V.Giovannacci.
- Alessandro Castello; Elio Protto; Sandro Zoia (2013). Alpi biellesi e valsesiane. Guida dei Monti d'Italia (in Italian). Milano: CAI / TCI.
