= Bocchetta del Croso =

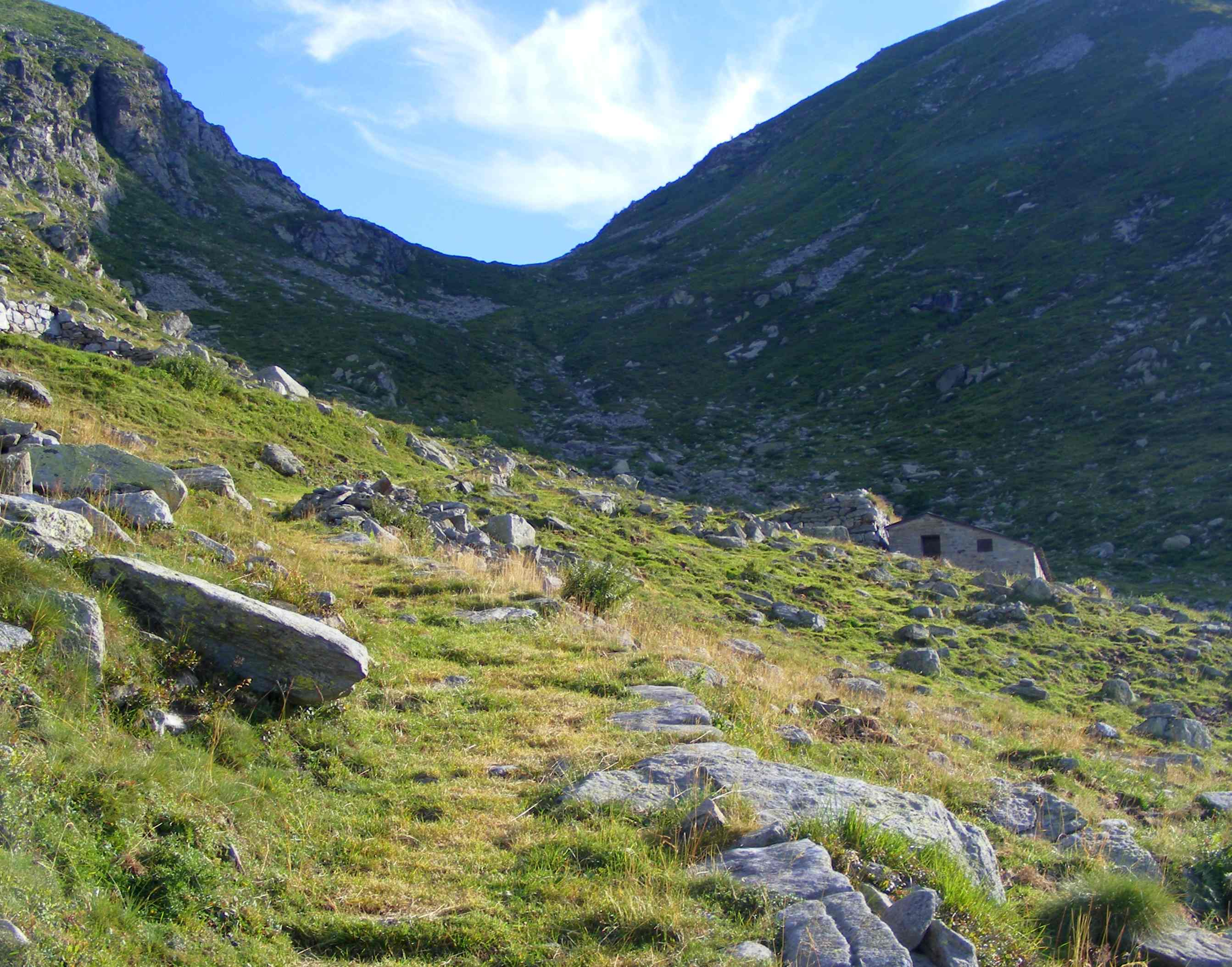
- Southern view from Alpe Finestre

- Location within Alps
- Elevation: 1,943 metres (6,375 ft)
- Traversed by: footpath

Third Approach
- Location: Piedmont, Italy
- Range: Alpi Biellesi
- Coordinates: 45°43′13″N 07°58′27″E

Bocchetta del Croso is a pedestrian pass (el. 1,943 m) across the Alpi Biellesi. It connects Cervo valley (BI) and Valsesia (VC), both in Piemonte (Italy).

== Etymology ==
In the local dialect croso means gully, small valley, maybe referring to the Valsesia's side of the pass, sharply eroded by water.

== Geography ==
The pass is located between Punta la Cascinaccia (2,069 m, W) and Punta Rusca (2,455 m, E, a sub-peak of Monte Bo). It belongs to the water divide between the drainage basins of Cervo and Sesia. In the SOIUSA (International Standardized Mountain Subdivision of the Alps) it divides the mountain subgroups composing Alpi Biellesi: Catena Tre Vescovi-Mars (SOIUSA code:I/B-9.IV-A.1) and Catena Monte Bo-Barone (SOIUSA code: I/B-9.IV-A.2).

== Hiking ==
Bocchetta del Croso can be accessed from south by a wide stone-paved trail starting from Montesinaro (1,037 m), a village belonging to the comune of Piedicavallo (BI). On the opposite side the trail continues until Alpe Toso, from where is possible to reach Rassa (VC) or Gressoney-Saint-Jean (AO).

== Maps ==
- Italian official cartography (Istituto Geografico Militare - IGM); on-line version: www.pcn.minambiente.it
- Provincia di Biella cartography: Carta dei sentieri della Provincia di Biella, 1:25.00 scale, 2004; on line version: webgis.provincia.biella.it
