= Monte Barone =

Mountain in Italy

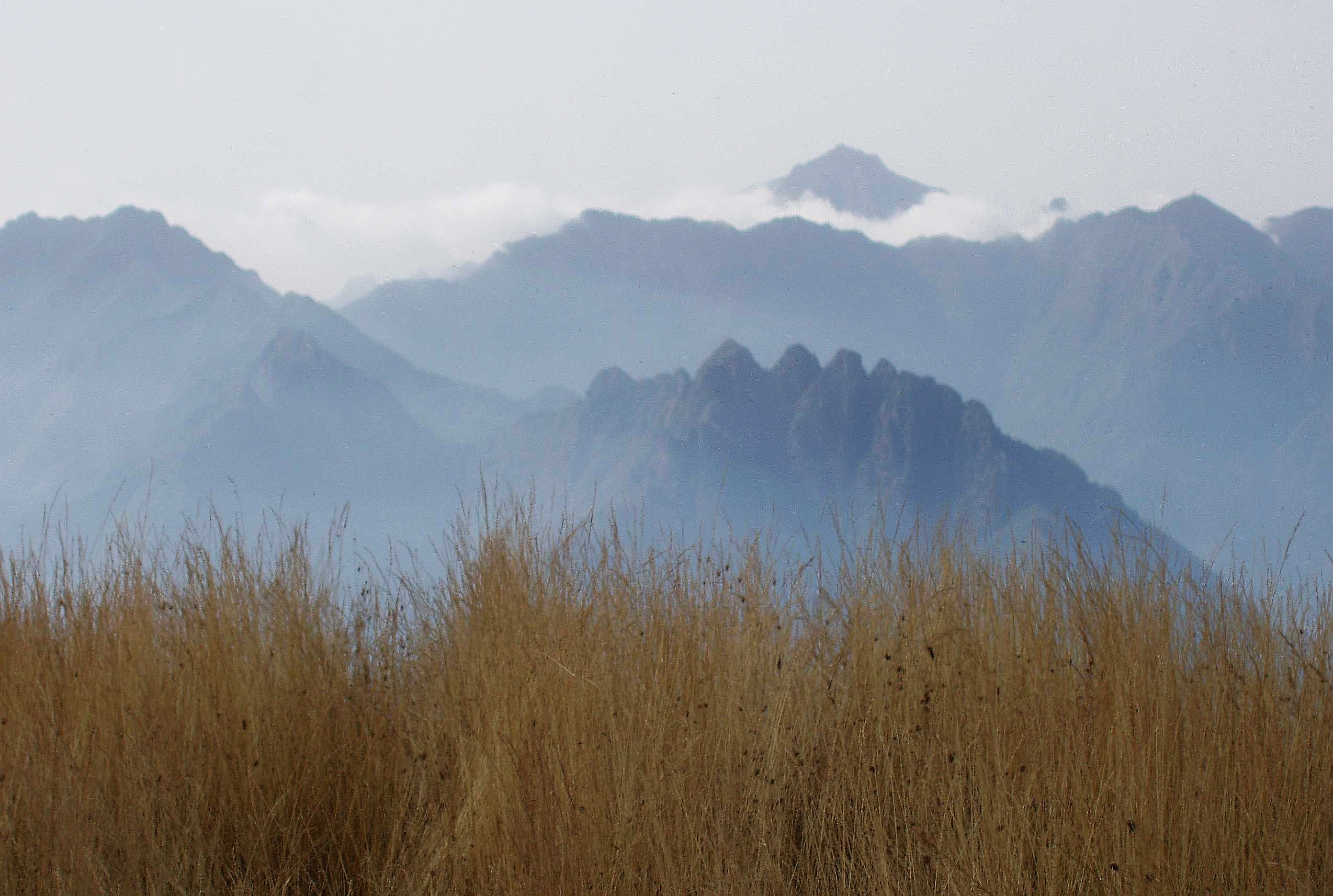
- View from Valsesia (foreground: Denti di Gavala)

Highest point
- Elevation: 2,044 m (6,706 ft)
- Prominence: 622 m (2,041 ft)
- Isolation: 10.32 km (6.41 mi)
- Listing: Alpine mountains 2000-2499 m
- Coordinates: 45°44′15″N 08°09′12″E

Geography
- Location within Alps Location within Italy
- Location: Province of Biella, Italy
- Parent range: Alpi Biellesi

Climbing
- Easiest route: from Piane di Coggiola

Monte Barone is a mountain of the Alpi Biellesi, a sub-range of the Pennine Alps. Due to its isolation it offers a noteworthy point of view towards the Po plain and can be seen from quite a long distance away (i.e. from Turin).

== Etymology ==
The name comes from the Piedmontese language word for baron, which means heap or pile. The same etymology occurs for several other mountains like Colma di Mombarone or Monte Baron (Graian Alps).

== Geography ==
The mountain is located in the Sesia drainage basin between the Strona di Postua and the Sessera valleys, close to the border between the Province of Vercelli and the province of Biella. Administratively it is divided between the comunes of Coggiola and Caprile, both belonging to the province of Biella.

=== SOIUSA classification ===
According to the SOIUSA (International Standardized Mountain Subdivision of the Alps) the mountain can be classified in the following way:

- main part = Western Alps
- major sector = North Western Alps
- section = Pennine Alps
- subsection = Southern Valsesia Alps
- supergroup = Alpi Biellesi
- group = Catena Monte Bo-Barone
- subgroup = Costiera Talamone-Barone
- code = I/B-9.IV-A.2.a

== Access to the summit ==
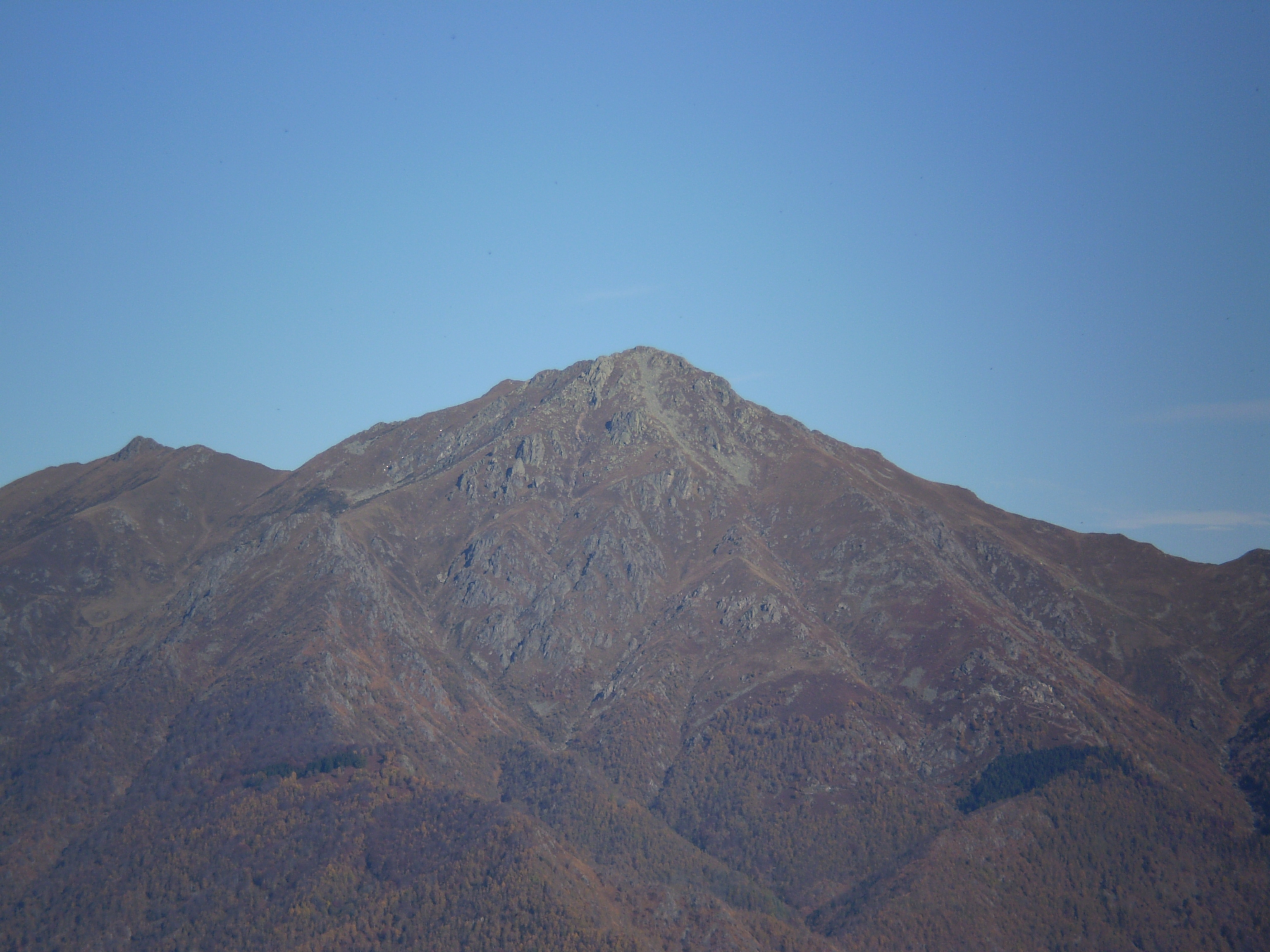
Monte Barone's south face

The easiest route for the summit is a long footpath starting from Piane di Coggiola (950 m, BI) and reaching the mountain via its southern slopes. A mountain hut with 22 bunk-beds is located at 1,610 m - Rifugio Monte Barone can be useful for hikers and climbers.

== Maps ==
- Italian official cartography (Istituto Geografico Militare - IGM); on-line version: www.pcn.minambiente.it
- Provincia di Biella cartography: Carta dei sentieri della Provincia di Biella, 1:25.00 scale, 2004; on line version: webgis.provincia.biella.it
