= Punta Tre Vescovi =

Mountain in Italy

Punta Tre Vescovi Pointe des Trois-Évêques
- Cima Tre Vescovi, Pic des Trois-Évêques
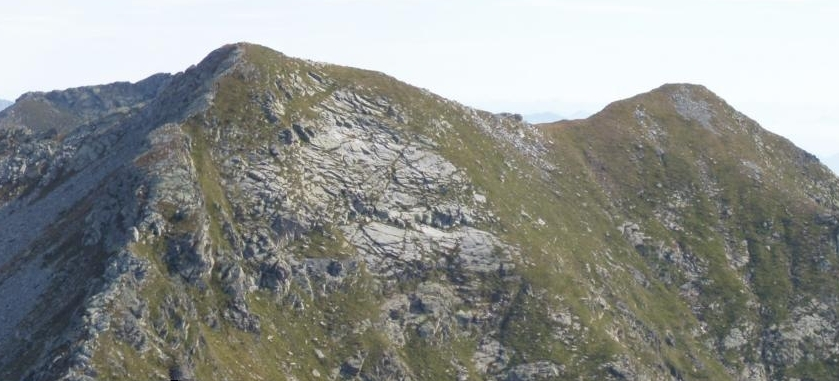

Highest point
- Elevation: 2,501 m (8,205 ft)
- Prominence: 60 m (200 ft)
- Coordinates: 45°43′31″N 7°56′15″E

Geography
- Location within Alps
- Location: Piedmont/Aosta Valley, Italy
- Parent range: Alpi Biellesi

Climbing
- Easiest route: from the Mologna Grande Pass

Punta Tre Vescovi (also Cima Tre Vescovi; French: Pointe des Trois-Évêques) is a peak in the Biellese Prealps, in northern Italy. On its top, three valleys meet: Lys Valley, Valsesia, and Cervo Valley.

== Etymology ==
Its name (meaning "Peak of the Three Bishops") stems from the fact that the peak is the convergence point of the Catholic dioceses of Biella, Aosta and Vercelli.

== Geography ==
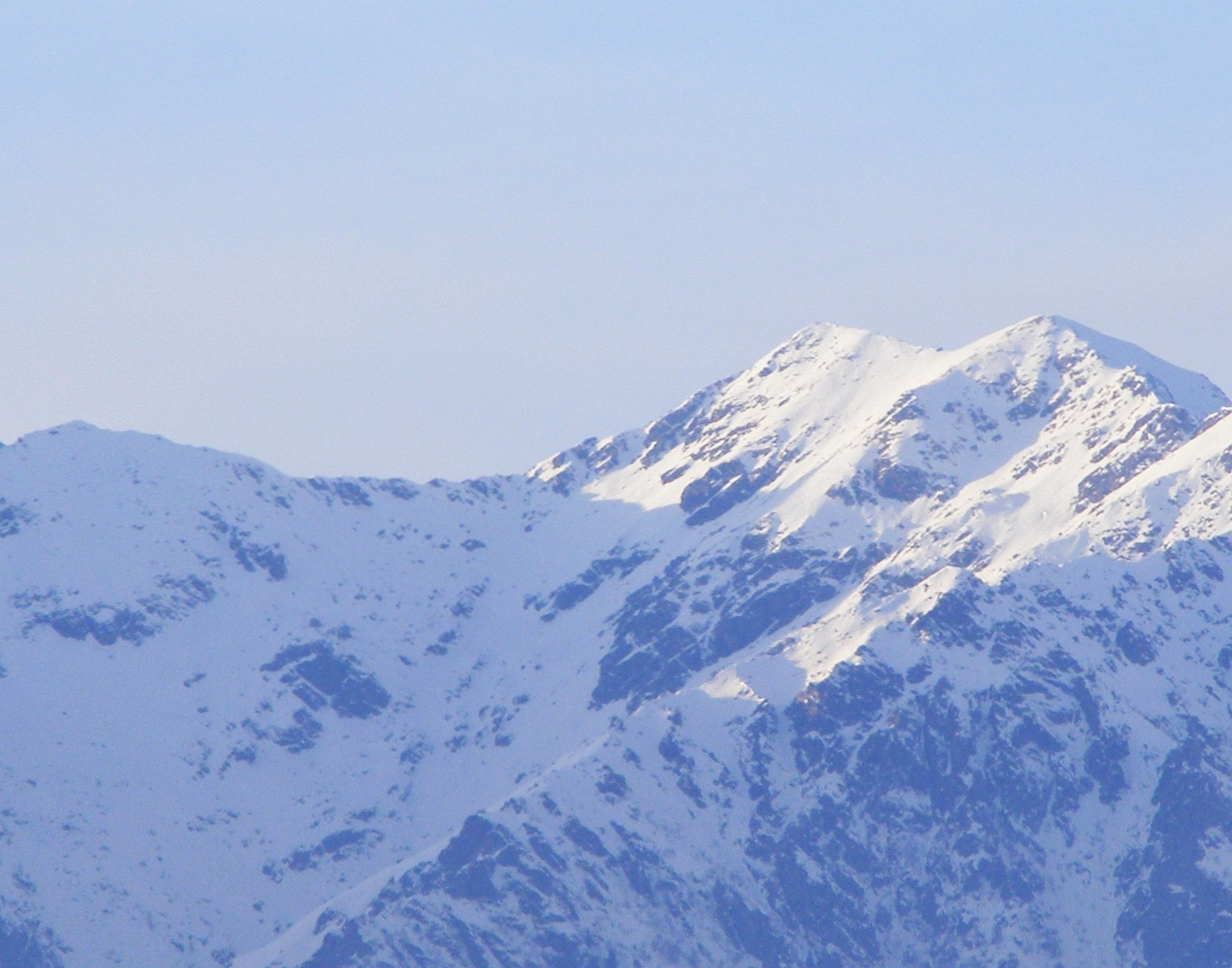
Winter view from Colma di Biella

In the SOIUSA (International Standardized Mountain Subdivision of the Alps) it gives the name to a mountain group called "Catena Tre Vescovi - Mars". The mountain is divided from the neighboring mount Gemelli di Mologna by the Mologna Grande pass. On the Valsesia side (NE) there are three small lakes (Italian: Laghi dei Tre Vescovi), while another one is on the Aosta Valley side (French: Lac du Grekij).

Administratively Punta Tre Vescovi is included in the comuni of Gaby, Rassa and Andorno Micca.

== Access to the summit ==
The summit of the mountain can be reached from Piedicavallo following E60 footpath up to rifugio Alfredo Rivetti. From there the normal route attains the Mologna Grande Pass and then the summit following the mountain SW ridge. The Mologna Grande Pass can also reached on waymarked footpaths from the villages of Gaby (Aosta Valley) or Rassa (province of Vercelli).

== Mountain huts ==
Rifugio Alfredo Rivetti (2,150 m)

== Maps ==
Media related to Punta Tre Vescovi at Wikimedia Commons

- Italian official cartography (Istituto Geografico Militare - IGM); on-line version: www.pcn.minambiente.it
- Carta dei sentieri della Provincia di Biella 1:25.00 - Biellese nord-occidentale. Provincia di Biella. 2004.

== Bibliography ==
- Giancarlo Regis; Renza Piana Regis (1981). Nuova guida alle Alpi biellesi (in Italian). Biella: libreria V.Giovannacci.
- Alessandro Castello; Elio Protto; Sandro Zoia (2013). Alpi biellesi e valsesiane. Guida dei Monti d'Italia (in Italian). Milano: CAI / TCI.
