= Monte Camino =

Mountain in Italy

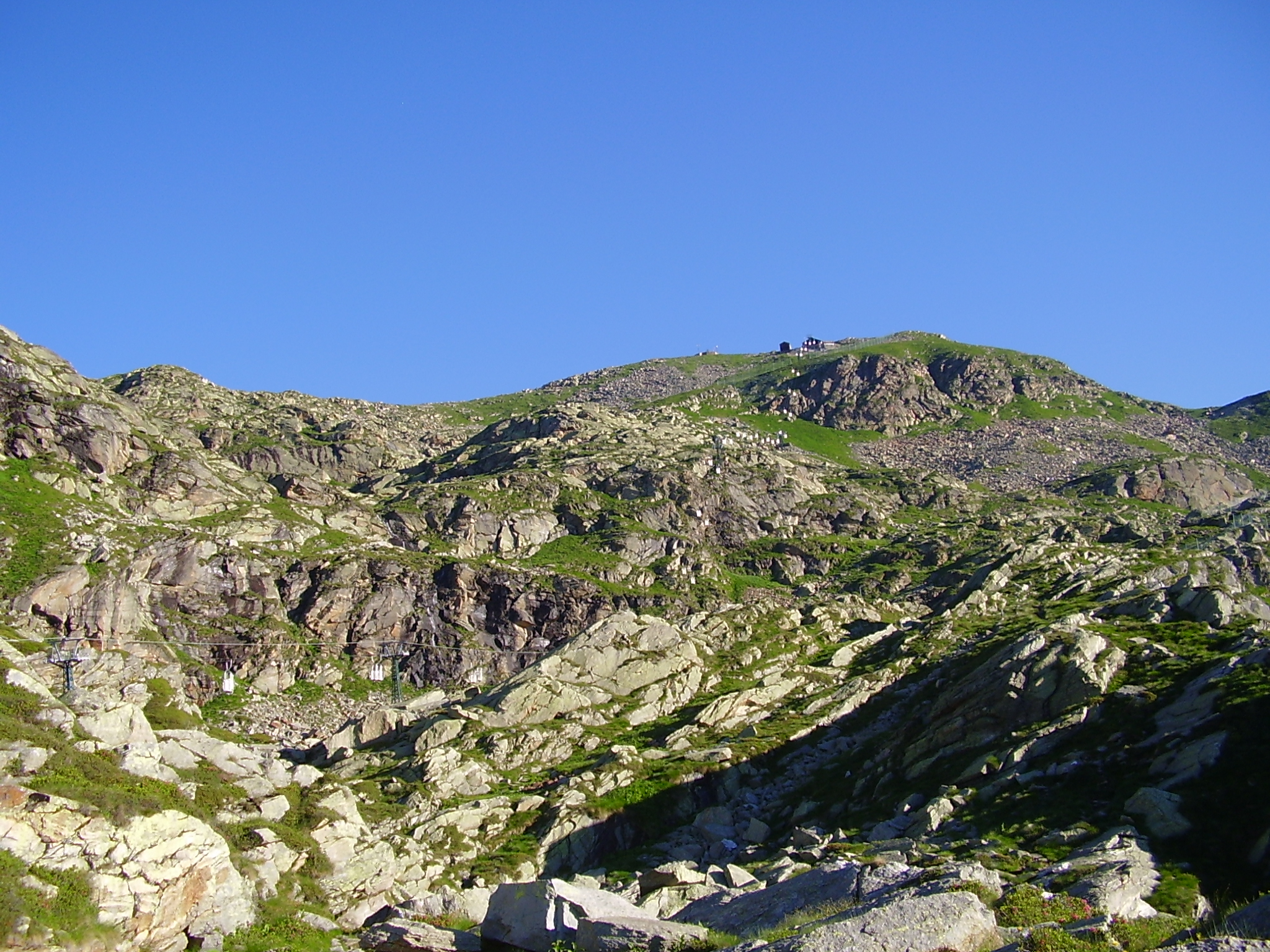

Highest point
- Elevation: 2,388 m (7,835 ft)
- Prominence: 167 m (548 ft)
- Coordinates: 45°38′41.7″N 7°56′40.31″E

Geography
- Location within Italy
- Location: Piedmont, Italy
- Parent range: Biellese Alps

Monte Camino is a peak in the Biellese Alps, in northern Piedmont, northern Italy. It has an elevation of 2,388 metres (7,835 ft).

It can be reached from Biella and Andorno Micca.

== Maps ==
- Italian official cartography (Istituto Geografico Militare - IGM); on-line version: www.pcn.minambiente.it
- Provincia di Biella cartography: Carta dei sentieri della Provincia di Biella, 1:25.00 scale, 2004; on line version: webgis.provincia.biella.it
- Carta dei sentieri e dei rifugi, 1:50.000 scale, nr. 9 Ivrea, Biella e Bassa Valle d'Aosta, Istituto Geografico Centrale - Torino
