= Punta della Gragliasca =

Mountain in Italy

Punta della Gragliasca Pointe de Gragliasca
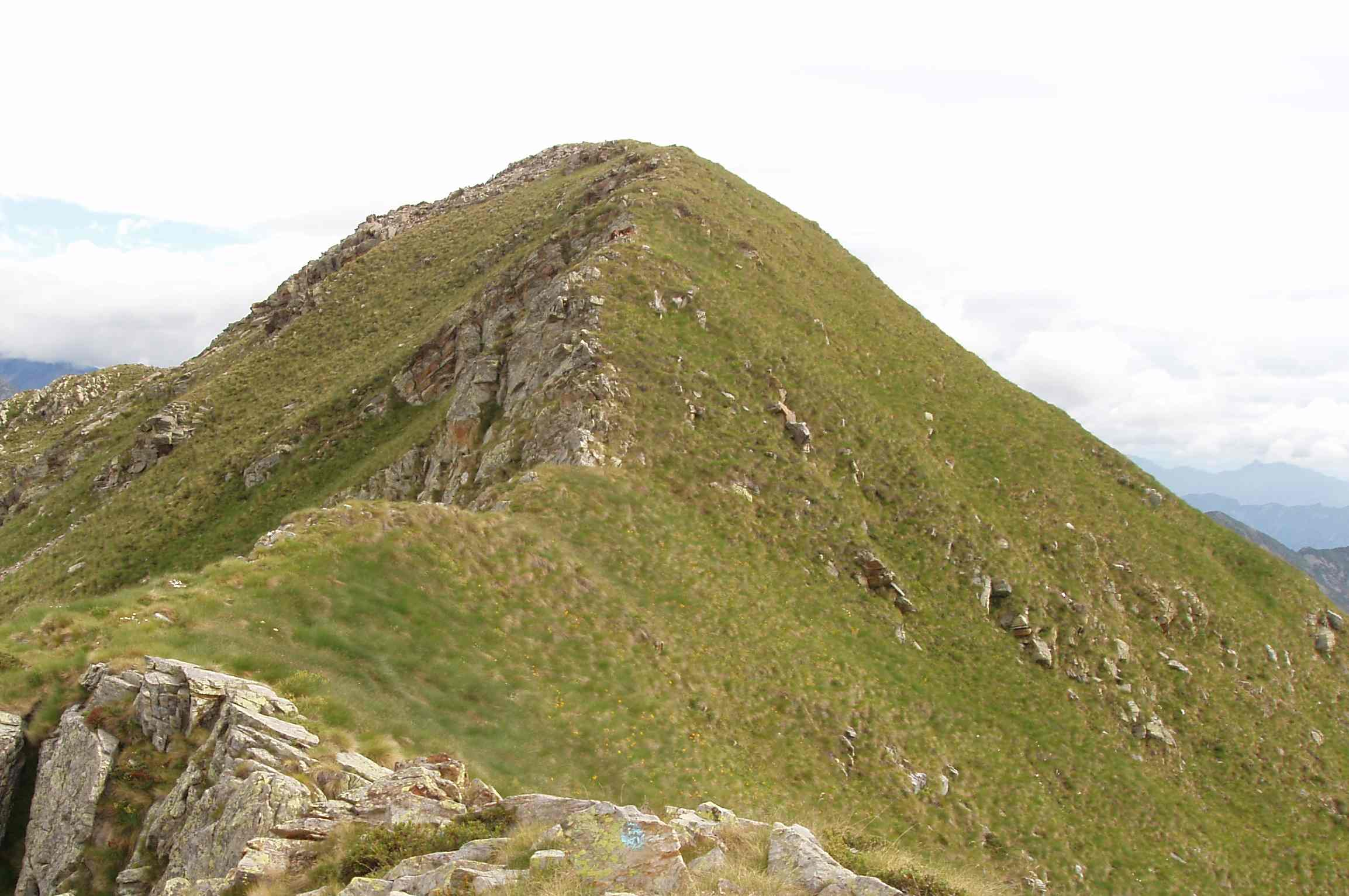

Highest point
- Elevation: 2,397 m (7,864 ft)
- Coordinates: 45°39′53″N 7°55′21″E

Geography
- Location: Piedmont/Aosta Valley, Italy
- Parent range: Alpi Biellesi

Punta della Gragliasca (pointe de Gragliasca in French) is a mountain of the Biellese Alps, in north-western Italy, with an elevation of 2,397 meters.

== Details ==
The mountain lies on the border between the Aosta Valley and the Piedmontese province of Biella, part of a ridge which divides the Lys Valley from the Biella region. The Gragliasca Pass divides it from the nearby Punta Gran Gabe (the names of these two peaks are exchanged in some maps), and an unnamed gap separates it from Monte Pietra Bianca.

The peak can be reached by hikers starting from Pillaz, a hamlet of Fontainemore, through the Gragliasca Pass.
