= Monte Bo =

Mountain in Italy

- Cima di Bo
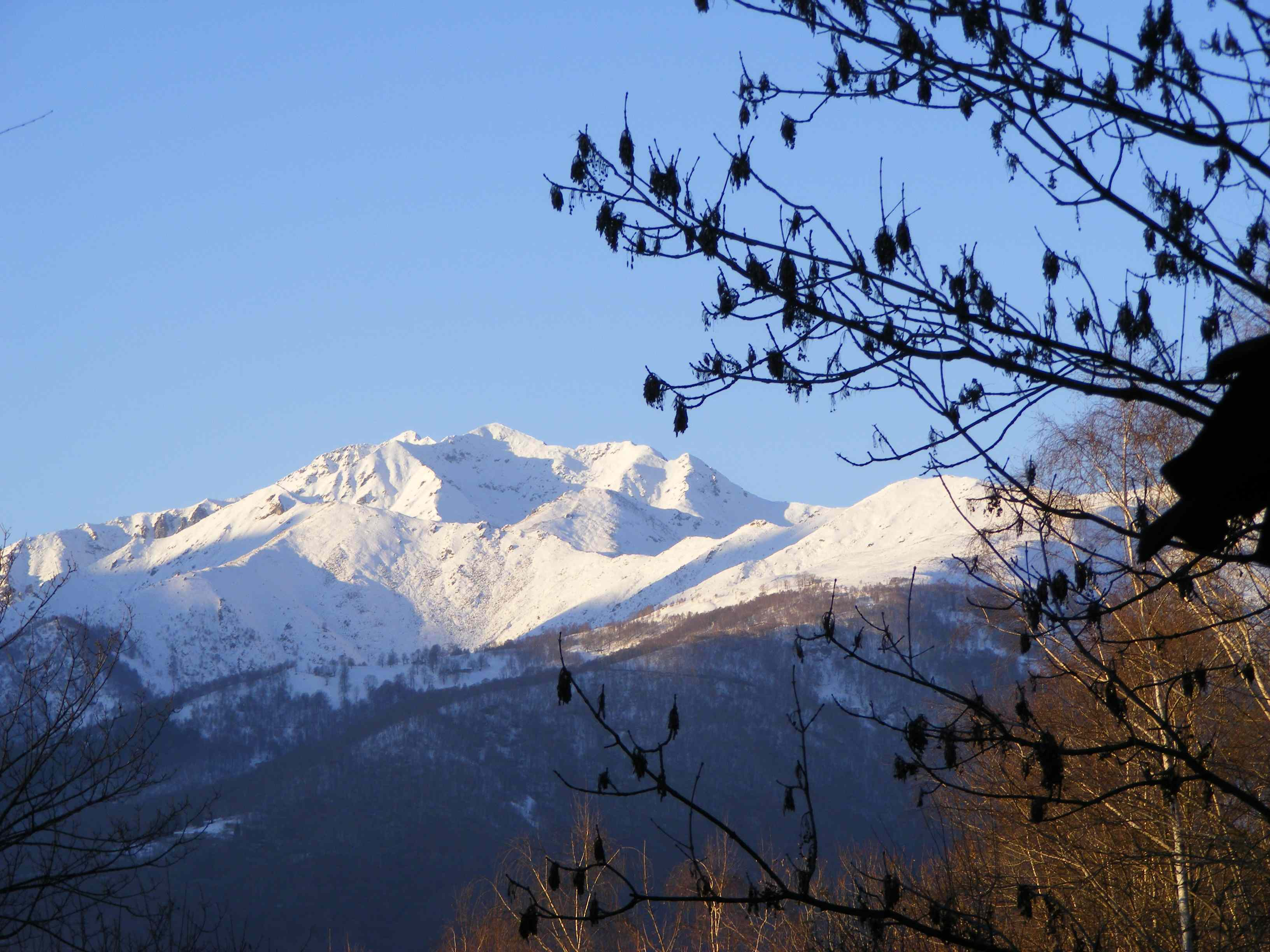
- Mount Bo from Colma di Biella

Highest point
- Elevation: 2,556 m (8,386 ft)
- Prominence: 613 m (2,011 ft)
- Isolation: 5.46 km (3.39 mi)
- Listing: Alpine mountains 2500-2999 m
- Coordinates: 45°42′54″N 07°59′55″E

Geography
- Location within Alps
- Location: Province of Biella, Italy
- Parent range: Alpi Biellesi

Climbing
- Easiest route: from Piedicavallo

Monte Bo (or Cima di Bo) is a mountain in the Alpi Biellesi, a sub-range of the Pennine Alps.

== Geography ==
The mountain is located between the Sessera and Cervo valleys and is totally included in the province of Biella. It is divided between the comune of Piedicavallo and the mountain exclaves of Pettinengo, Tavigliano and Valle San Nicolao.

=== SOIUSA classification ===
According to the SOIUSA (International Standardized Mountain Subdivision of the Alps) the mountain can be classified in the following way:

- main part = Western Alps
- major sector = North Western Alps
- section = Pennine Alps
- subsection = Southern Valsesia Alps
- supergroup = Alpi Biellesi
- group = Catena Tre Vescovi - Mars
- subgroup = Costiera Bo-Cravile-Monticchio
- code = I/B-9.IV-A.2.b

With an elevation of 2,556 m, it is the second highest peak of the Province of Biella after Monte Mars (2,600 m).

== Access to the summit ==
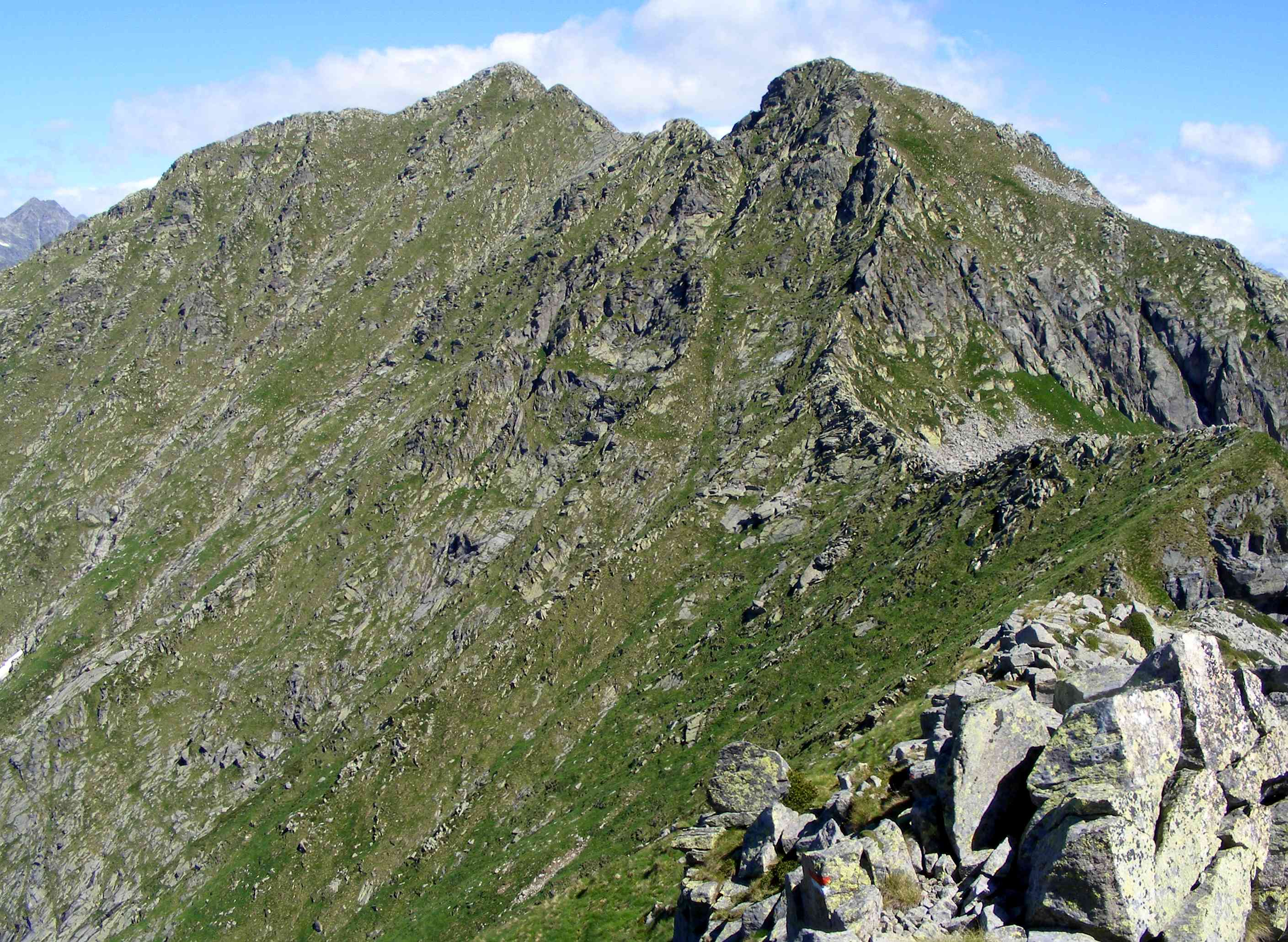
Mount Bo from Punta del Cravile; on its right Punta del Manzo

The easiest route to the summit is a long but well marked footpath starting from Montesinaro, a village belonging to Piedicavallo township. Nearby the mountain's top is located Bivacco Antoniotti, an emergency mountain shelter.

The summit of the Bo is a well known hiking destination, and since the 19th century it has been celebrated because:

- It commands a vast and varied panorama of the Alps and plains, which has been engraved by the Italian Alpine Club.

== Maps ==
- Italian official cartography (Istituto Geografico Militare - IGM); on-line version: www.pcn.minambiente.it
- Provincia di Biella cartography: Carta dei sentieri della Provincia di Biella, 1:25.00 scale, 2004; on line version: webgis.provincia.biella.it
- Carta dei sentieri e dei rifugi, 1:50.000 scale, nr. 9 Ivrea, Biella e Bassa Valle d'Aosta, Istituto Geografico Centrale - Torino
