= Lago del Mucrone =

Lake in Italy

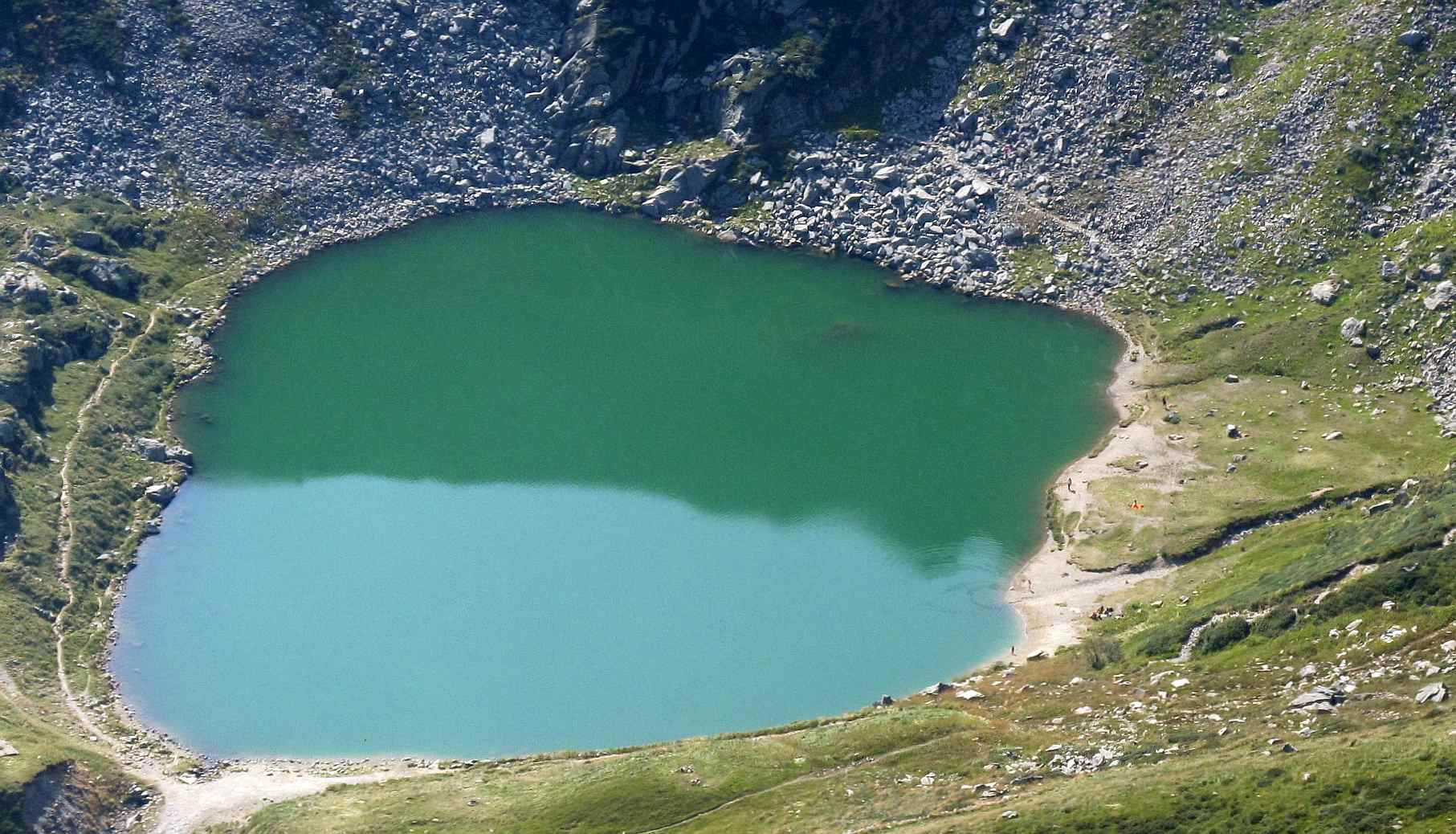
- The lake seen from Monte Rosso

- Location within Piedmont
- Location: Province of Biella, Piedmont
- Coordinates: 45°37′41″N 7°56′33″E
- Primary outflows: Torrente Oropa
- Basin countries: Italy
- Surface area: 0.01713 km^{2} (0.00661 sq mi)
- Surface elevation: 1,894 m (6,214 ft)

Lago del Mucrone is a lake in the Province of Biella, Piedmont, Italy. At an elevation of 1894 m, its surface area is 0.01713 km².
