= Lillianes =

Lillianes Yian-e (Valdôtain) Elljini (Walser)
- Comune
- Comune di Lillianes; Commune de Lillianes
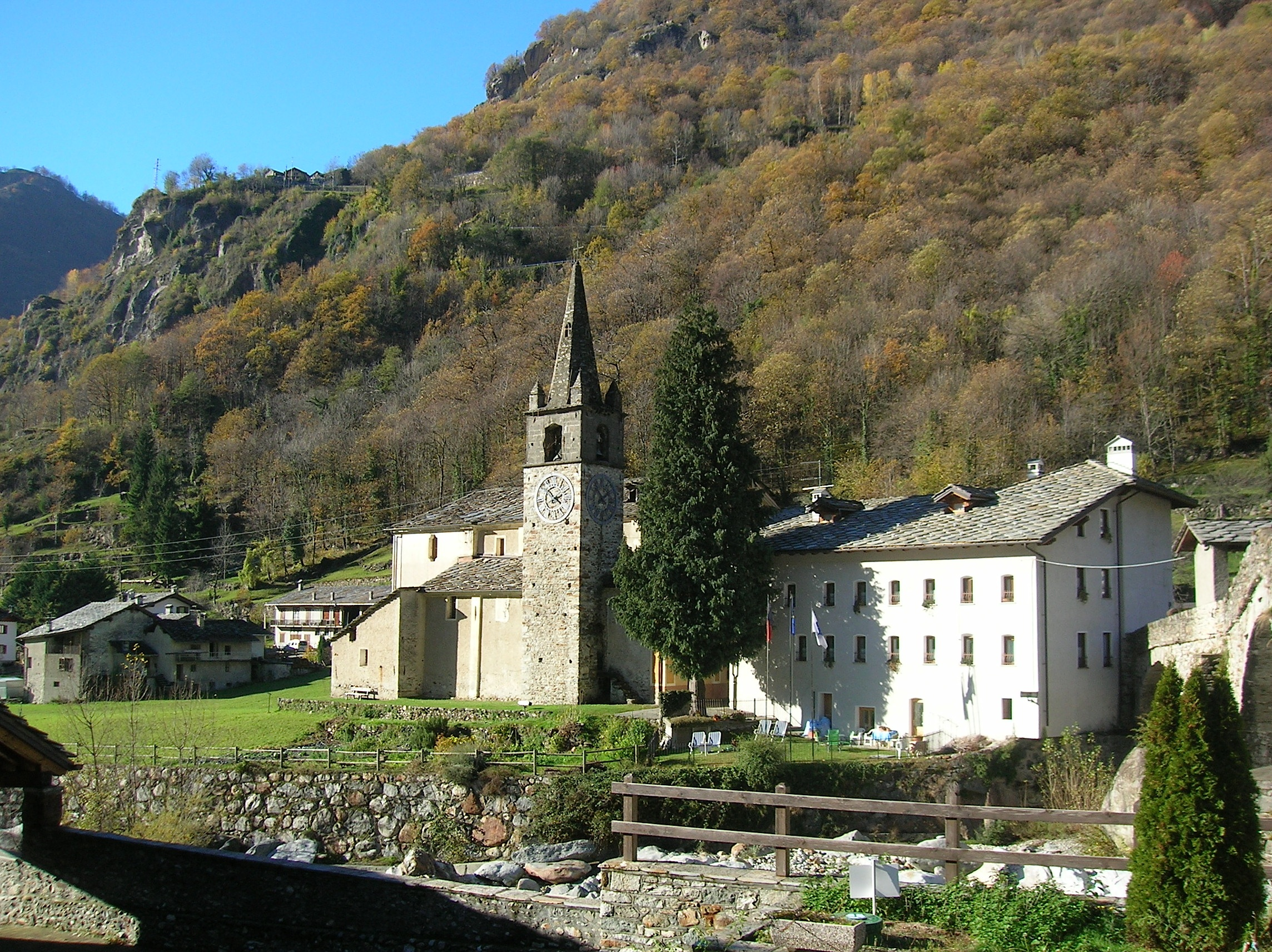

- Coat of arms

- Location within Italy Location within Aosta Valley
- Coordinates: 45°38′N 7°51′E
- Country: Italy
- Region: Aosta Valley
- Province: none

Government
  - Mayor: Daniele De Giorgis

Area
  - Total: 18 km^{2} (6.9 sq mi)
- Elevation: 667 m (2,188 ft)

Population (31 December 2022)
  - Total: 425
  - Density: 24/km^{2} (61/sq mi)
- Demonym: Lillinois
- Time zone: UTC+1 (CET)
  - Summer (DST): UTC+2 (CEST)
- Postal code: 11020
- Dialing code: 0125
- Patron saint: Saint Roch
- Saint day: 16 August
- Website: Official website

Lillianes (French: [liljan]; Valdôtain: Yian-e; Issime Walser: Elljini) is a town and comune in the Aosta Valley region of north-western Italy.
