= Biellese Alps =

Mountain range in Italy

Alpi Biellesi
- Prealpi Biellesi
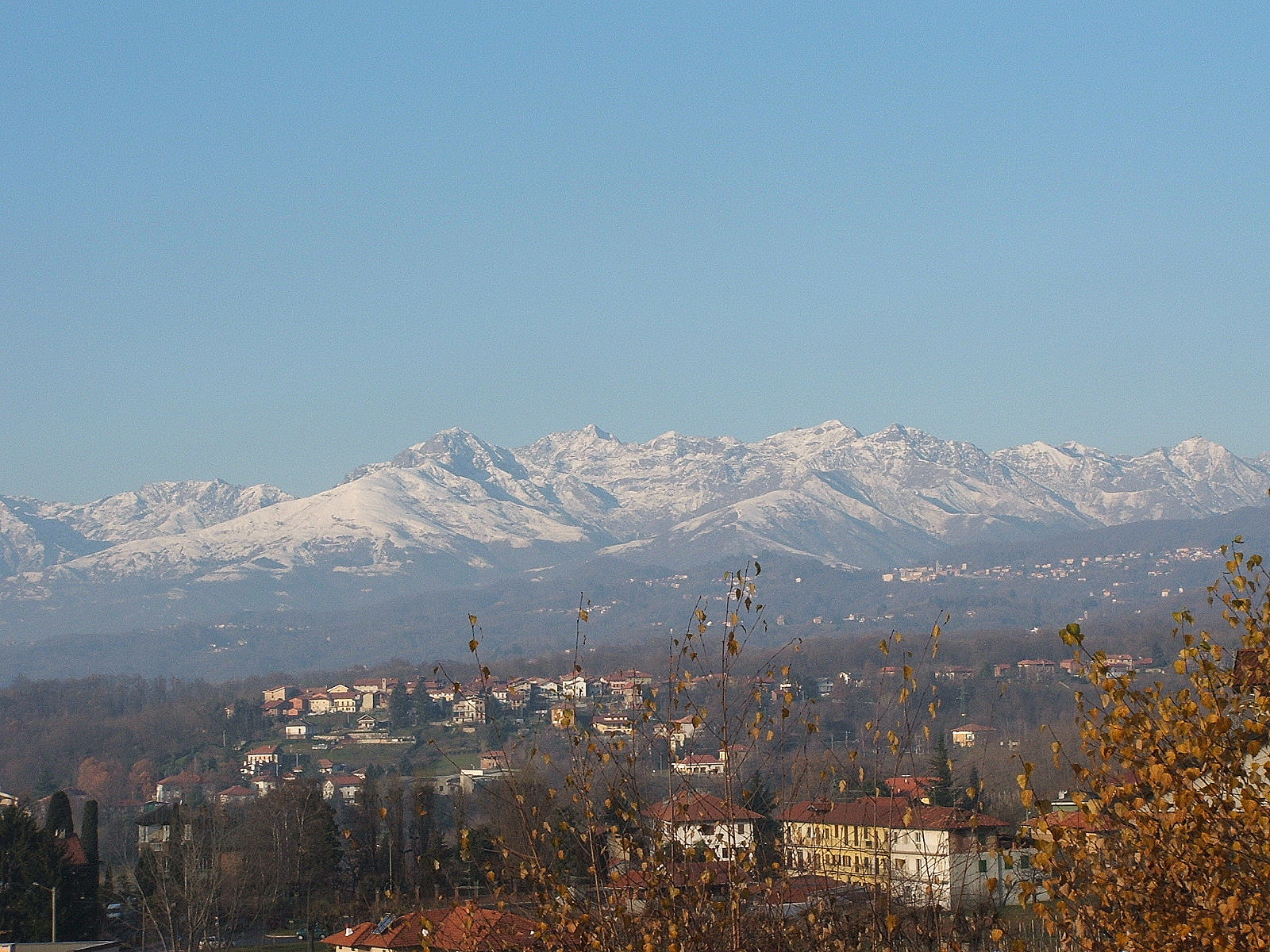
- The snow-clad Biellese Alps seen from Lessona.

Highest point
- Peak: Monte Mars
- Elevation: 2,600 m (8,500 ft)
- Coordinates: 45°38′04″N 7°54′52″E

Geography
- Country: Italy
- Provinces: Biella, Turin, Vercelli and Aosta Valley
- Regions: Piedmont and Aosta Valley
- Rivers: Dora Baltea, Elvo, Cervo and Sesia
- Settlement: Biella
- Parent range: Pennine Alps

Geology
- Orogeny: Alpine orogeny

The Biellese Alps (Alpi Biellesi or Prealpi Biellesi in Italian) are a sub-range of the Pennine Alps located between Piemonte and Aosta Valley (Italy).

== Etymology ==
Alpi Biellesi literally means Alps of Biellese; Biellese is the geographical and historical area surrounding Biella, nowadays included in the province of Biella.

== Geography ==
Administratively most part of the range belongs to the province of Biella, while its northern part falls in the province of Vercelli and the western one is divided between Province of Turin and Aosta Valley.

=== SOIUSA classification ===
According to SOIUSA (International Standardized Mountain Subdivision of the Alps) the mountain range is an Alpine supergroup classified in the following way:

- main part = Western Alps
- major sector = North-Western Alps
- section = Pennine Alps
- subsection = Southern Valsesia Alps
- supergroup =Alpi Biellesi
- code = I/B-9.IV-A

=== Borders ===
Borders of the Alpi Biellesi are:

- Colle del Loo (2,452 m) and Valsesia from Val Vogna to Varallo Sesia (north),
- Valsesia from Varallo Sesia to Gattinara (east),
- Po plain between Gattinara and Ivrea (south),
- Dora Baltea until Pont Saint Martin and Lys creek until Gaby and Colle del Loo (west).

=== Subdivision ===
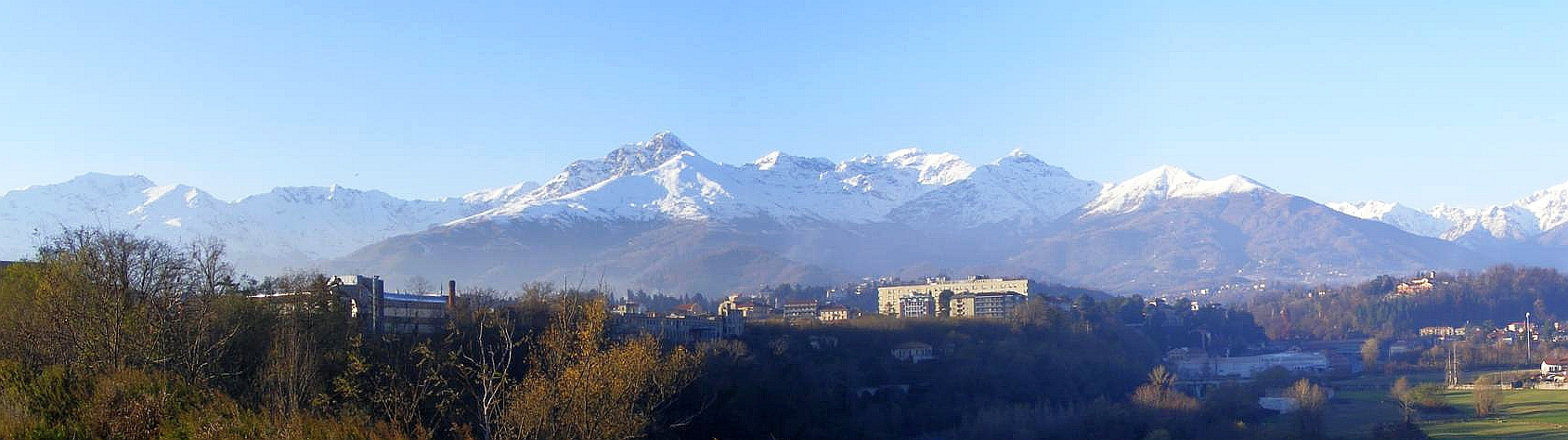
Catena Tre Vescovi - Mars

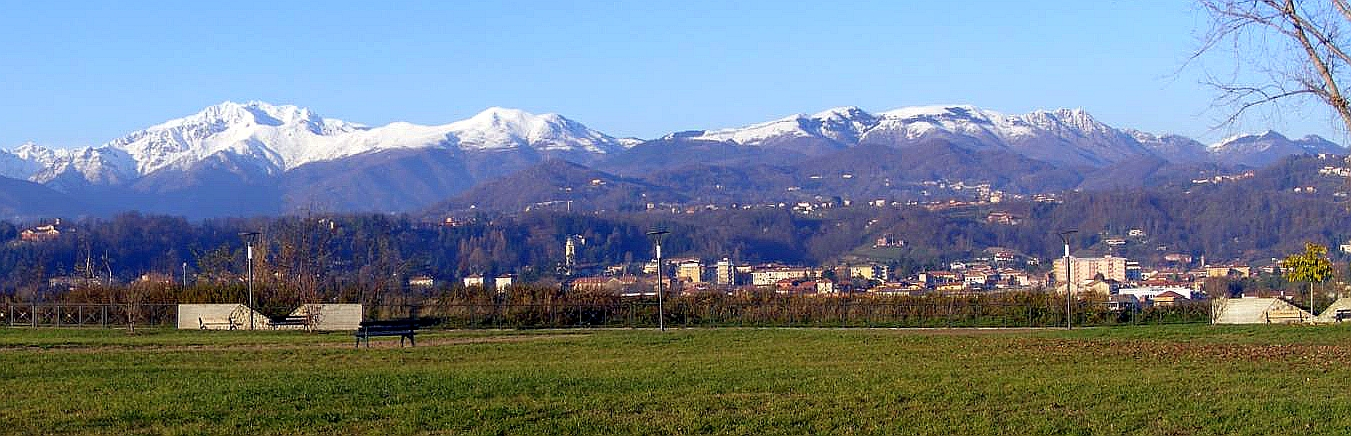
Catena Monte Bo - Barone

The Alpi Biellesi are divided into two alpine groups, one of them further subdivided in subgroups (in brackets is reported their SOIUSA code):

- Catena Tre Vescovi - Mars (A.1)
- Catena Monte Bo - Barone (A.2)
  - Costiera Talamone-Barone (A.2.a)
  - Costiera Monte Bo-Punta del Cravile-Monticchio (A.2.b)

These two subgroups are connected by Bocchetta del Croso.

== Geology ==
From the geological point of view the Alpi Biellesi are composed by an alpine zone in the strict sense of the word and a prealpine zone, divided by the Insubric line (locally named Linea del Canavese). This important geologic fault, which forms the border between the Adriatic Plate and the European Plate, crosses Biellese from SW to NE through Bocchetto di Sessera and Bocchetta della Boscarola passes. Thus hills and mountains (i.e. Monte Barone) located south-east of the line can be considered part of southern Apulian foreland while most part of the range, located NW of the line, geologically belongs to the crystalline zone of the Alps.

== Notable summits ==
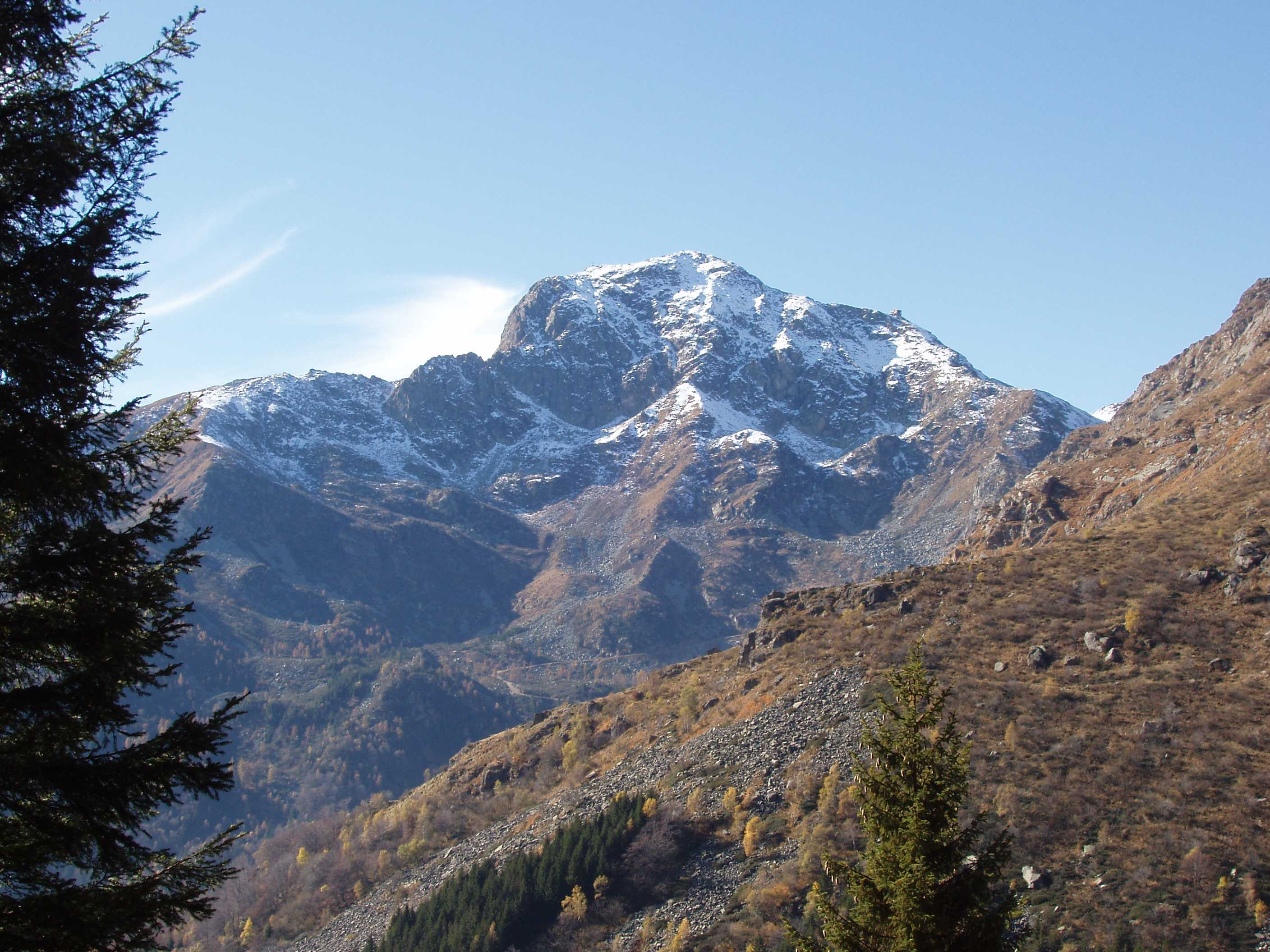
Mount Mucrone

Name	metres	Name	metres
Monte Mars	2,600	Mont de Pianeritz	2,584
Punta Loozoney	2,579	Monte Bo	2,556
Monte Cresto	2,548	Cima Tre Vescovi	2,501
Monte I Gemelli	2,476	Punta della Gragliasca	2,397
Monte Camino	2,388	Colma di Mombarone	2,371
Monte Mucrone	2,335	Monte Tovo	2,230
Bec di Nona	2,085	Monte Barone	2,044

== Notable passes ==
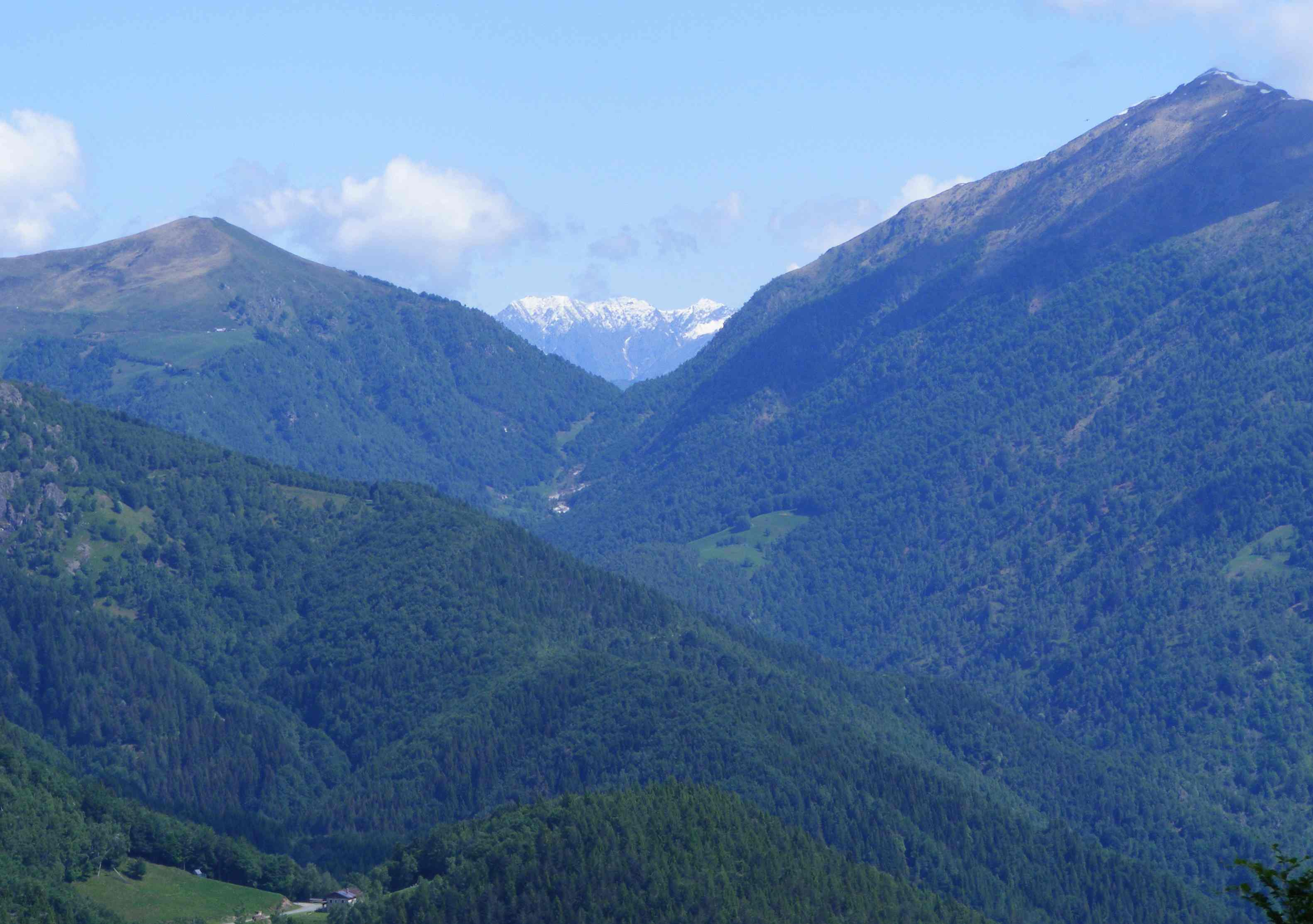
Bocchetta della Boscarola from Bocchetto di Sessera

Name	location	type	metres
Colle della Mologna Grande	Gaby - Piedicavallo	bridle path	2,364
Colle del Loo	Gressoney-Saint-Jean - Rassa	bridle path	2,452
Bocchetta del Croso	Piedicavallo - Rassa	bridle path	1,943
Colle della Mologna Piccola	Gaby - Piedicavallo	bridle path	2,208
Colle della Barma	Oropa (Biella) - Fontainemore	bridle path	2,257
Bocchetto di Sessera	Campiglia Cervo - Trivero - Valle Sessera	road	1,373
Bocchetta della Boscarola	Scopello - Valle Sessera	dirt road	1,423
Colle della Gragliasca	Rosazza - Fontainemore	footpath	2,208
Colle della Vecchia	Piedicavallo - Gaby	bridle path	2,185
Colle della Lace	Sordevolo - Settimo Vittone - Lillianes	footpath	2,121

== Winter sports ==
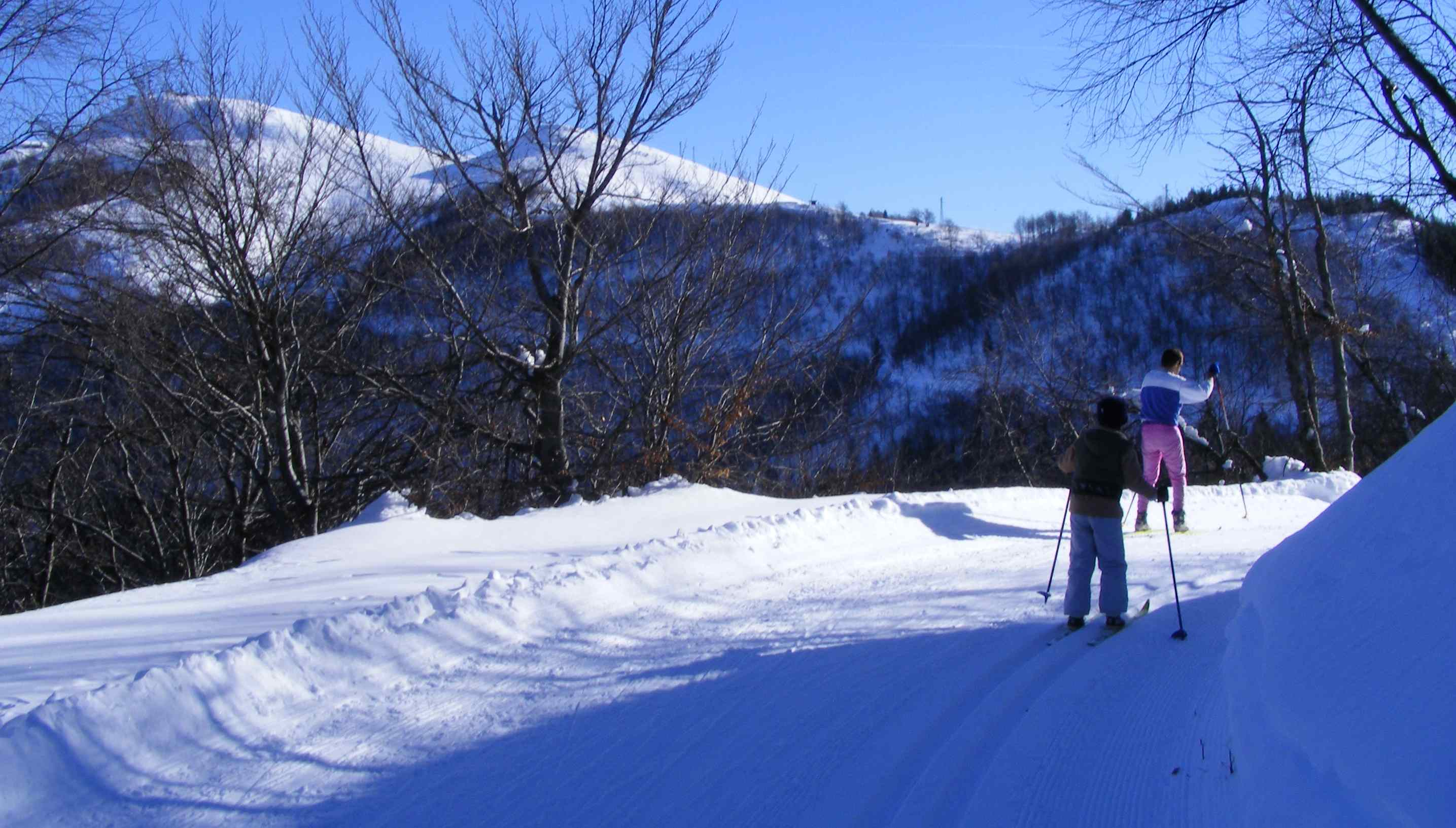
Cross country skiing (Bocchetto Sessera)

In the Alpi Biellesi are located some ski resorts: Oropa (Biella) in the western part, with downhill skiing slopes ranging from 1,335 to 2,391 m; Alpe di Mera (Scopello) and Bielmonte in the eastern part of the range. Near Bielmonte is also possible to practice cross country skiing with more than 30 km of maintained trails starting from Bocchetto Sessera (1,373 m).

== Hiking and climbing ==
Many climbing routes of varying length and difficulty are described across the mountain range. Some of the most renowned are in the monte Mars area, like via Innominata and cresta dei Carisey. In the Alpi Biellesi there also are several vie ferratas, particularly around Oropa.

The Alta Via delle Alpi Biellesi (literally high way of the Alpi Biellesi), a long-distance hiking trail which requires some climbing skills, covers the mountain range starting from Piedicavallo and ending in the village of Bagneri (Muzzano). The trekking is usually divided into five stretches and along it is possible to get food and accommodation in the following alpine huts: rifugio Rivetti, rifugio della Vecchia, capanna Renata al Monte Camino, rifugio Coda and rifugio Mombarone.

== Bibliography ==
- Regis, Giancarlo; Renza Piana Regis (2001). Nuova Guida delle Alpi Biellesi. Biella: Vittorio Giovannacci.
- Castello, Alessandro; Sandro Zoia (2011). Alpi Biellesi e Valsesiane. Guida dei Monti d'Italia (in Italian). Touring Club Italiano.

== Maps ==
- Italian official cartography (Istituto Geografico Militare - IGM); on-line version: www.pcn.minambiente.it
- Provincia di Biella cartography: Carta dei sentieri della Provincia di Biella, 1:25.00 scale, 2004; on line version: webgis.provincia.biella.it

== See also ==
- Sessera Valley
- Cervo Valley
- Strona di Mosso Valley
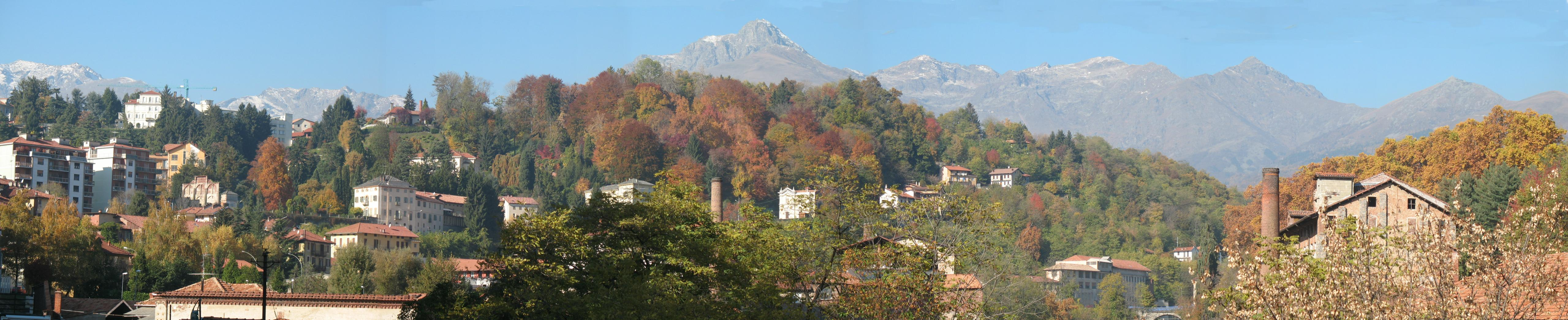
View of the Alpi Biellesi from Chiavazza, a quarter of Biella.
