= Mont Mars =

Mountain in Italy

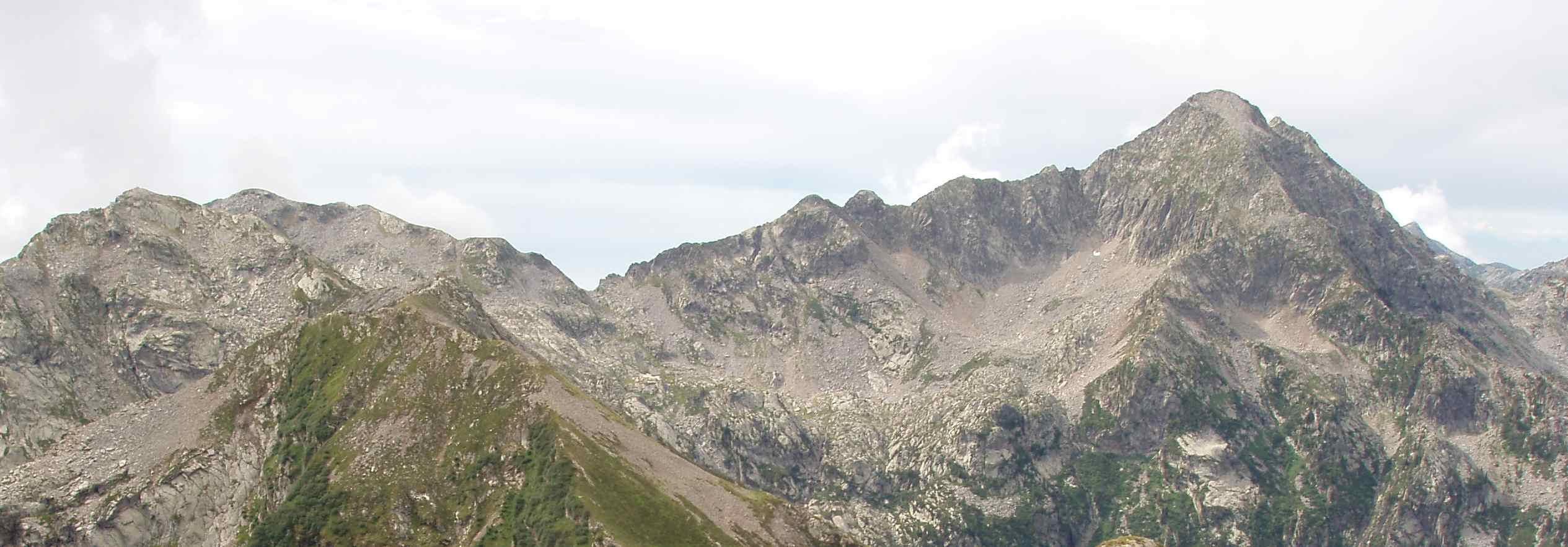

Highest point
- Elevation: 2,600 m (8,500 ft)
- Prominence: 413 m (1,355 ft)
- Isolation: 10.53 km (6.54 mi)
- Listing: Alpine mountains 2500-2999 m
- Coordinates: 45°38′04″N 7°54′52″E

Geography
- Location within Alps
- Location: Piedmont/Aosta Valley, Italy
- Parent range: Alpi Biellesi

Mont Mars at 2,600 m, is the highest peak of the Biellese Alps, north-western Italy.

== Geography ==
It is located on the water divide between the Lys Valley (Aosta Valley) and the Elvo Valley (Province of Biella).

In the SOIUSA (International Standardized Mountain Subdivision of the Alps) it gives the name to a mountain group called "Catena Tre Vescovi - Mars".

It gives its name to a nearby nature reserve, the Mont Mars Nature Reserve (Italian: Riserva Naturale Mont Mars; French: Réserve naturelle du mont-Mars).

== Access to the summit ==
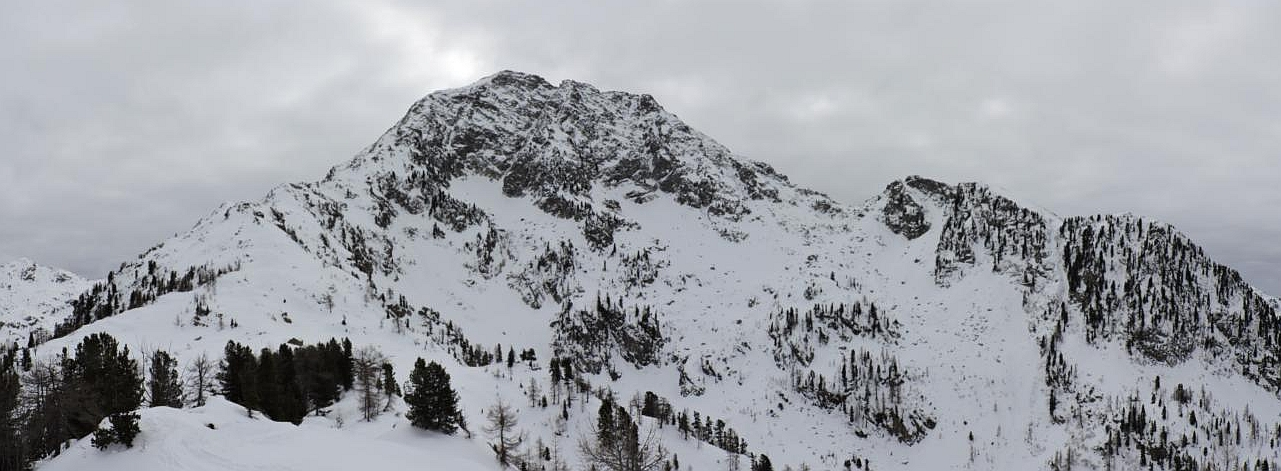
Winter view from Aosta Valley

It can be ascended from the south, starting from the Sanctuary of Oropa or, from the North, starting from the Lys Valley. The summit provides a panorama across the plains of the Po Valley and of the Monte Rosa massif.

A classical climbing route reaches the summit following the SSW ridge of the mountain, named Crête de Carisey.

== Mountain huts ==
- Coda Mountain Hut (2,280 m)

== Maps ==
- Italian official cartography (Istituto Geografico Militare - IGM); on-line version: www.pcn.minambiente.it
- Province of Biella cartography: Carta dei sentieri della Provincia di Biella, 1:25.00 scale, 2004; on line version: webgis.provincia.biella.it
- Carta dei sentieri e dei rifugi, 1:50.000 scale, nr. 9 Ivrea, Biella e Bassa Valle d'Aosta, Istituto Geografico Centrale - Torino

== See also ==
- Lake della Barma

== See also ==
Media related to Monte Mars at Wikimedia Commons
