= Cervo Valley =

- Valle Cervo or Valle di Andorno or Bürsch
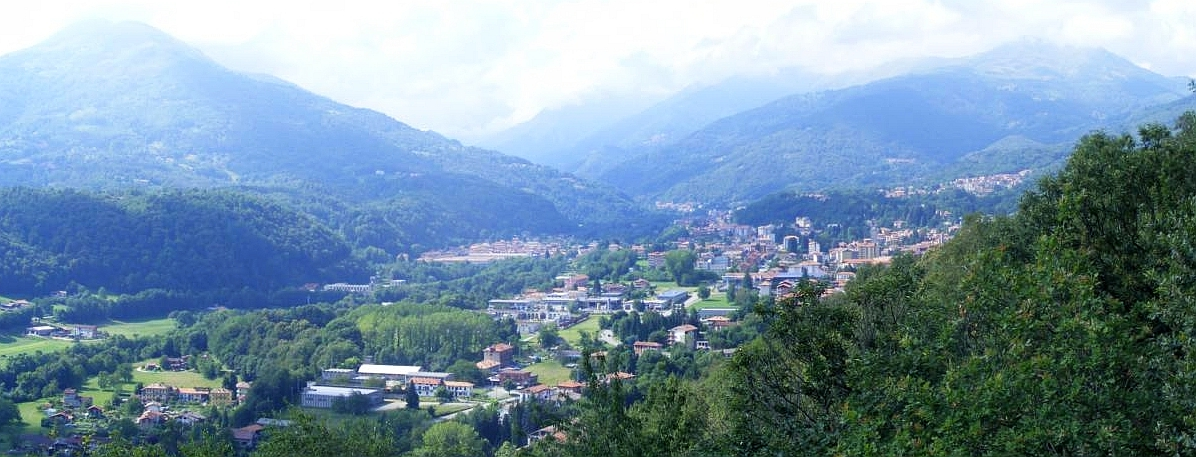
- The lowest part of the valley

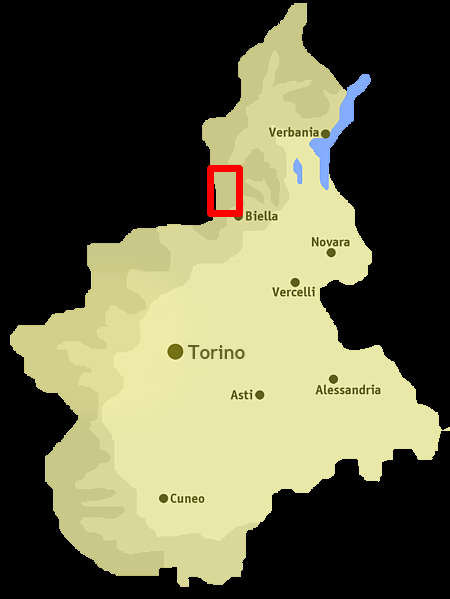
- Location of the valley in Piedmont, northern Italy
- Floor elevation: 400–2,556 m (1,312–8,386 ft)
- Length: around 20 km (12 mi) north south

Geology
- Type: River valley

Geography
- Location: Piedmont, Italy
- Coordinates: 45°36′36″N 8°03′29″E

Cervo Valley (in Italian Valle Cervo or Valle di Andorno, in Piedmontese Val d'Andorn, in Walser German Bürsch) is a valley in north-east of Piedmont in the Province of Biella, Italy.

== Etymology ==
The valley takes its name from Cervo, a right-hand tributary of the Sesia which flows through the valley. It is also called Valle di Andorno from Andorno Micca, a town which lies in the main valley near its exit on the Po plain.

== Geography ==
Besides Andorno other municipalities of the area are Biella, Campiglia Cervo, Miagliano, Piedicavallo, Pralungo, Quittengo, Rosazza, Sagliano Micca, San Paolo Cervo, Tavigliano and Tollegno.

== Notable summits ==
Among the notable summits which surround the valley (all belonging to the Biellese Alps) there are:

- Monte Bo - 2.556 m
- Monte Cresto - 2.548 m
- Punta Tre Vescovi - 2.501 m
- Monte Pietra Bianca - 2.490 m
- Gemelli di Mologna - 2.476 m

== See also ==
- Biellese Alps
