= Istituto Geografico Centrale =

- Industry: Publishing
- Founded: 1952
- Founder: Giuseppe Candeletti
- Headquarters: Via Prati 2, Turin, Italy
- Products: Hiking maps
- Website: www.istitutogeograficocentrale.it

The Istituto Geografico Centrale (IGC, in English ‘’Central Geographic Institute’’) is a privately owned Italian company based in Turin (Piedmont), known for its guide books and hiking maps mainly concerning the Western Alps and their contiguous areas.

== History ==
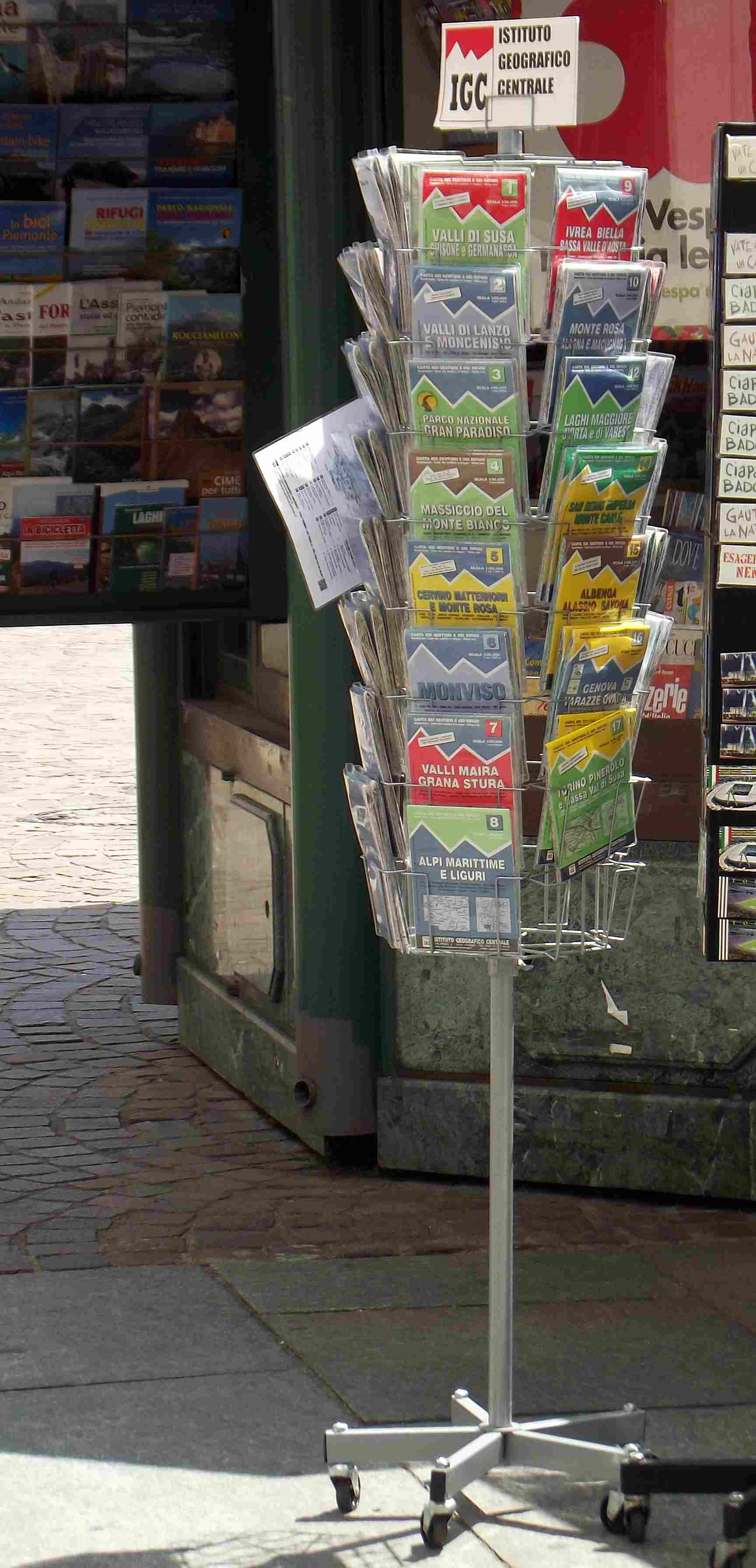
IGC maps display

IGC was established by Giuseppe Candeletti in 1952. Its first products were some very detailed maps of Turin and the Guida Toponomastica di Torino (Toponomastic guide of Turin). The following year IGC published an 'Atlante di Milano (Atlas of Milan) at scale of 1:5,000 .

Some year later IGC started with mountaineering publishing, which in those years was expanding in Italy. After a first 1:50,000 map about the Parco Nazionale del Gran Paradiso other 1:50,000 maps appeared, gradually covering the Alps from Lombardy to Liguria. Later on other 1:50,000 maps about hills and plains of NW Italy followed, and IGC also published more detailed maps, at scale of 1:25,000, mainly intended for climbers and alpinists and also reporting, aside footpaths and ascent routes, also mountain bike tracks and ski mountaineering routes.

The Istituto geografico Centrale is recognised for the role it played for decades in support of hiking and alpinism in the Western Alps. Although other map publishers appeared in Italy IGC maps, at least as far as 2012, were still considered highly widespread and the only ones able to cover the whole Piedmont area.

== IGC guide books (Guide IGC) ==
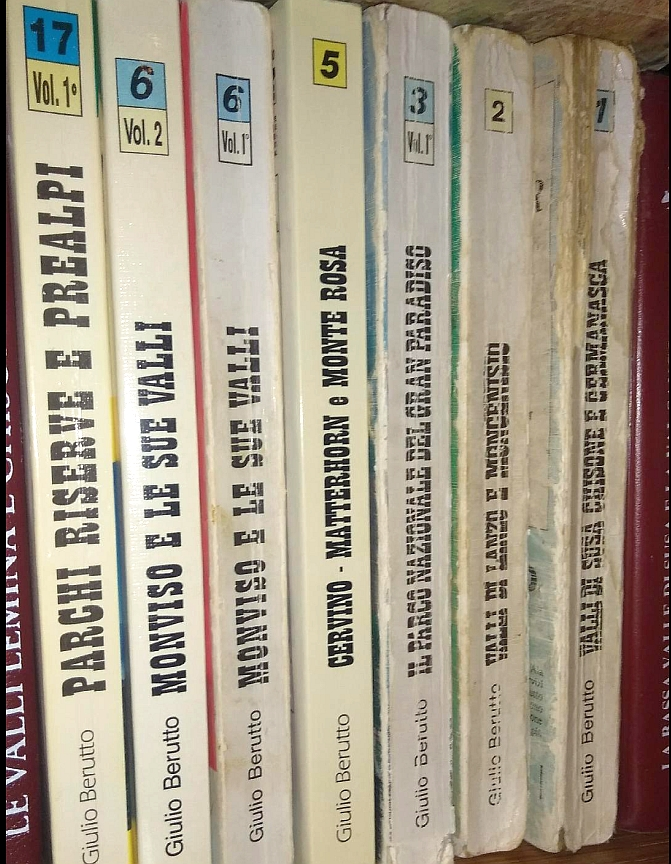
Some issues of the Guide IGC

Alongside its maps I.G.C. also published the Guide IGC, a serie of guide books signed by the alpinist Giulio Berutto, who was one of the authors of CAI reference books making up the Guida dei Monti d'Italia. Each of Berutto's guide book, consisting in one or two volumes, covers the area of one of the 1:50,000 IGC map with a wide range of hiking, climbing and mountain bike itineraries. Despite its author's death in November 2004, which stopped further issues of the serie, many of the Guide IGC are still considered a reference by hikers and alpine huts managers.

== IGC bookshop ==
IGC manages a bookshop, also established in 1952, dealing with technical and scientific mapping like aeronautical and nautical charts, administrative and geological maps etc. Before digitalisation it also used to sell the maps published by national mapping agencies from European and, if available, extra-European countries. It also works as a branch of CAI.
