= Zegna (disambiguation) =

Zegna is an Italian luxury fashion group and a brand.

Zegna may also refer to:

== People ==
- Ermenegildo Zegna (1892–1966), Italian entrepreneur, founder of Zegna
- Ermenegildo "Gildo" Zegna (born 1955), Italian entrepreneur and manager, grandson of Ermenegildo
- Riccardo Zegna (born 1946), Italian jazz musician

== Places ==
- Oasi Zegna, natural territory located in the Biellese Alps, Piedmont, Italy
