= Cima del Bonom =

Mountain in Italy

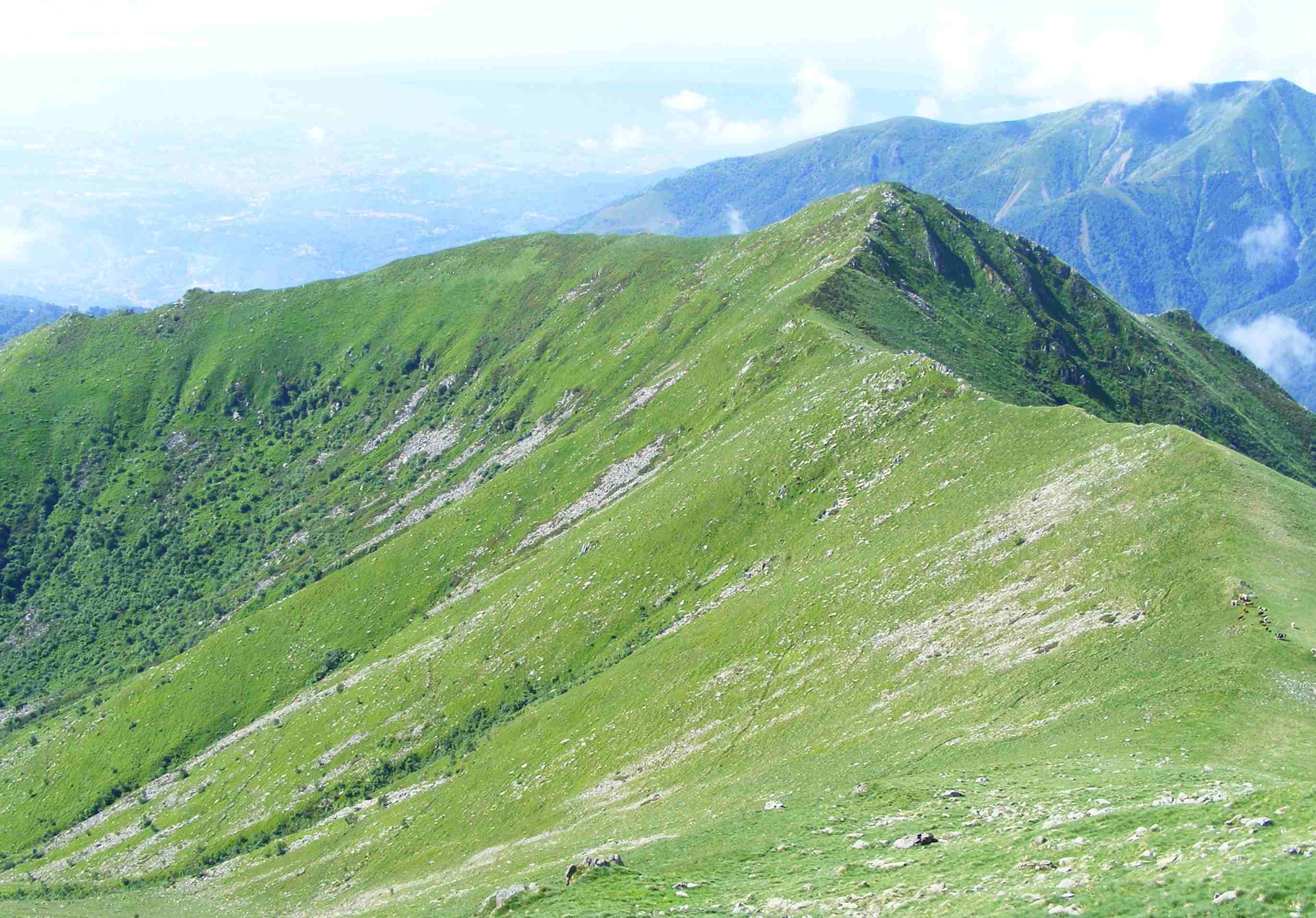
- Cima del Bonom seen from Cima delle Guardie

Highest point
- Elevation: 1,877 m (6,158 ft)
- Coordinates: 45°40′44″N 8°01′00″E

Geography
- Location: Piedmont, Italy
- Parent range: Biellese Alps

Cima del Bonom (Sima dël Bonòm in Piedmontese) is a mountain of Piedmont, Italy, with an elevation of 1,877 metres (6,158 ft). It is located in the Biellese Alps, in the Province of Biella.

It lies between the Val Sessera and the Valle Cervo, in the territory of Campiglia Cervo and Valdilana. The peak is located 3 kilometres east of the Monticchio, and is divided from the nearby Cima delle Guardie by the Bassa del Cugnolo (1,827 m).

The peak, where a geodetic point of the Istituto Geografico Militare is located, can be reached on foot from Bocchetto Sessera or from Oriomosso, a hamlet of Campiglia Cervo.

The Cima del Bonom is entirely located within the borders of the Oasi Zegna.
