= Ermenegildo Zegna =

Ermenegildo Zegna may refer to:

- Ermenegildo Zegna Group or simply Zegna, Italian luxury fashion house
- Ermenegildo Zegna (1892–1966), Italian entrepreneur, founder of Zegna
- Ermenegildo "Gildo" Zegna (born 1955), Italian entrepreneur and manager, grandson of Ermenegildo

== See also ==
- Zegna (disambiguation)
