= ZEGNA (brand) =

Italian luxury fashion house

- ZEGNA in Greenbelt, Makati, Philippines.
- Trade name: ZEGNA
- Type: Subsidiary
- Industry: Fashion
- Founded: 1910 (116 years ago) in Trivero, Piedmont, Italy
- Founder: Ermenegildo Zegna
- Key people: Ermenegildo Zegna, Executive Chairman; Edoardo Zegna and Angelo Zegna, CEOs; Alessandro Sartori, Artistic Director
- Parent: Ermenegildo Zegna Group
- Website: zegna.com

ZEGNA is an Italian luxury menswear brand and part of the Ermenegildo Zegna Group. Originally known as Ermenegildo Zegna, the brand adopted the name ZEGNA in 2021, aligning with its new logo to distinguish itself more clearly from the Group.

== History ==
In 1910, in Trivero, in the Biella province, Ermenegildo Zegna, along with his two brothers and a partner, founded Zegna & Giardino, a wool mill specializing in high-quality fabrics.

After the departure of Vitri and one of the brothers, the company remained under the leadership of Ermenegildo and his brother Mario until the early 1940s.

As early as the 1930s, Ermenegildo Zegna initiated significant social and environmental projects to improve the community’s well-being and preserve the surrounding environment. Among these was a 1929 reforestation project that led to the planting of over 500,000 conifers, laying the foundation for what is now the Oasi Zegna nature reserve.

In 1938, Zegna also promoted the construction of a scenic road, the Strada Provinciale 232 Panoramica Zegna, connecting Trivero to the Cervo Valley.

That same year, Zegna traveled to New York to meet Italian-American tailors, whom he considered the "best promoters of Zegna fabrics", forging business agreements with them. During this visit, he founded the Zegna Woollens Corporation, the company’s first international commercial branch for fabric distribution.

The following year, the first Zegna logo was registered, and the first Zegna boutique opened in Trivero, selling fabrics both wholesale and retail.

=== The second generation ===
In 1944, Aldo and Angelo Zegna, Ermenegildo’s sons, joined the company, which was renamed Lanificio Ermenegildo Zegna e Figli. They took over operations in 1966. In 1963, the Ermenegildo Zegna Wool Trophy was established in Australia to reward suppliers and encourage them to improve wool quality.

The second generation’s leadership marked a major shift: the brand moved from fabric production and sales to ready-to-wear clothing.

Following the success of the Australian event, the Mohair Trophy was launched in South Africa in 1970 to celebrate top mohair producers.

In 1972, Zegna introduced its Su Misura (“Made-to-Measure”) service.

During the early 1970s, the first edition of Pitti Uomo took place, and in 1975, Ermenegildo Zegna debuted at Pitti Uomo with its Spring/Summer 1976 collection. The following year, Zegna expanded internationally by entering the Japanese market and establishing E.Z. Japan.

In 1980, Zegna opened its first monobrand boutique in Paris on Rue de la Paix, designed by architect Vittorio Gregotti. Five years later, another boutique followed in Via Verri, Milan. This retail strategy aimed to position Zegna as a high-end luxury brand.

Meanwhile the brand’s geographic expansion continued, and in 1991, Zegna became the first luxury menswear brand to enter China, opening a store in Beijing.

In 1993, the Oasi Zegna nature reserve was established—an area of approximately 100 square kilometers dedicated to the study, conservation, and development of the mountainous territory.

=== The third generation ===
Between the late 1990s and early 2000s, the company’s leadership transitioned to the third generation, with Ermenegildo Zegna’s grandsons, Gildo and Paolo Zegna, taking charge.

In 1999, the company expanded its product portfolio with the launch of the Zegna Sport collection, featuring technical materials and performance-oriented designs. In 2003, Alessandro Sartori, who had been with the company since 1989, was appointed creative director of the newly launched Z Zegna line, aimed at a style-conscious audience.

2007 was a significant year for the brand: Z Zegna debuted in New York, and the company’s headquarters moved to Milan’s Via Savona, into a building designed by architects Antonio Citterio and Gianmaria Beretta. That same year, the first Ermenegildo Zegna global store opened in Via Monte Napoleone, Milan.

In 2010, to celebrate the company’s centennial, the Triennale di Milano hosted Zegna’s Spring/Summer 2011 collections alongside the exhibition Ermenegildo Zegna. A Hundred Years of Excellence. From Fabric Factory to Style Factory. In 2011, for the brand’s 20th anniversary in China, Zegna held a fashion show in Shanghai.

Between 2012 and 2016, several creative leadership changes took place: Sartori left Z Zegna and was succeeded by Paul Surridge, while Stefano Pilati served as creative director of Ermenegildo Zegna Couture from 2013 to 2016. In 2014, Zegna introduced the Triple Stitch sneaker and partnered with the Marcolin Group to produce sunglasses and optical frames under the Ermenegildo Zegna brand, launching in 2015.

In 2016, Alessandro Sartori returned to Zegna as artistic director, overseeing all brand-related creative initiatives. In 2017, Zegna opened its first Bespoke Atelier in Milan, offering custom tailoring services. For its Fall/Winter 2019 collection, the brand launched the #UseTheExisting project, dedicated to waste reduction through fiber and fabric recycling. This initiative won the ADI Design Index 2020 Innovation Award.

In 2021, the company announced plans to list on the New York Stock Exchange and consolidated its main product lines (EZ, Couture, and Z ZEGNA) under the single ZEGNA brand. In 2022, ZEGNA entered a partnership with Real Madrid, launched the Oasi Cashmere collection followed by Oasi Linen in 2023, and introduced initiatives promoting fiber traceability. That same year, the brand unveiled Zegna X, an AI-powered software providing customers with personalized shopping recommendations in-store and online, allowing them to create and order custom outfits.

In 2025, ZEGNA launched a partnership with Art Basel, focusing on the Visible project, an initiative promoted by Cittadellarte – Fondazione Pistoletto in collaboration with ZEGNA to support artists committed to social and environmental issues.

=== The fourth generation ===
From January 1, 2026, the Ermenegildo Zegna Group had a new governance structure that also affected ZEGNA: Gildo Zegna became Executive Chairman of the Group, and Edoardo and Angelo Zegna succeeded him as co-CEOs of ZEGNA.

== Collaborations ==
From 2020 onward, the brand engaged in various collaborative projects, including:

- ''Fear of God Exclusively for Ermenegildo Zegna'' with Jerry Lorenzo
- accessories in partnership with Leica
- a collaboration with Mr. Bailey for Triple Stitch sneakers
- a joint project with The Elder Statesman
- a collaboration with Norda
- a licensing agreement with Give Back Beauty for fragrance production

== Oasi Zegna ==
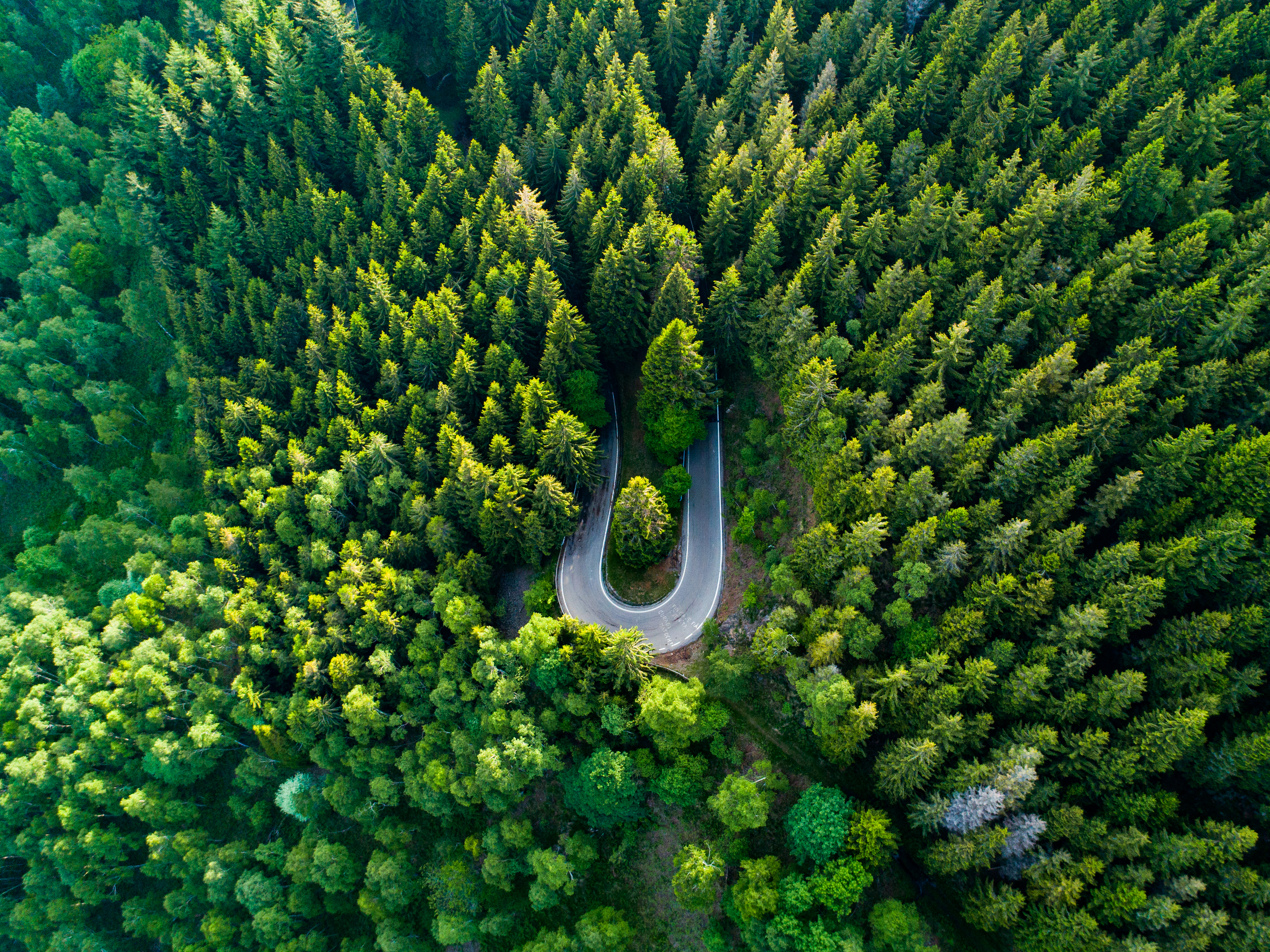
The forests of Oasi Zegna in summer

Born from the vision of Ermenegildo Zegna in the 1930s and launched as the Oasi Zegna project in 1993, it received official endorsement from the FAI – the Italian National Trust – in 2014, marking the first time such recognition was granted to a privately owned site.

The Zegna brand has been deeply connected to Oasi Zegna from the start, sharing its values and vision. In recent years, this connection has been highlighted through: the Oasi Cashmere and Oasi Linen collections, a three-year agreement (2024-2026) to manage Milan’s Piazza Duomo flowerbeds, replacing palm trees with plants native to Oasi Zegna, the opening of Villa Zegna in Shanghai, New York and Dubai (temporary spaces dedicated to brand experiences), and the publication of Born in Oasi Zegna, a book by Rizzoli.

== Advertising campaigns ==
Over the years, numerous actors and models have represented ZEGNA's collections. Celebrities featured in the brand’s advertising campaigns include Academy Award-winning actor Adrien Brody, American model Ryan Burns, Irish actor Jamie Dornan and the English actor Sam Riley.

In 2014, ZEGNA produced a four-part short film series titled A Rose Reborn, directed by Park Chan-wook.

In 2017, the brand launched a four-chapter campaign called Defining Moments. The campaign featured celebrities such as Robert De Niro, McCaul Lombardi, Benjamin Millepied, Park Chan-wook, Yoo Ji-tae, Wang Deshun, Sunny Wang, Javier Bardem, Dev Patel. The first three chapters were directed by Craig McDean, while the final installment was entrusted to Luca Guadagnino.

In 2019, ZEGNA launched the campaign What Does It Mean to Be a Man Today?, starring Mahershala Ali and Nicholas Tse, exploring the modern definition of masculinity.

In 2022, the brand introduced The 232 campaign, inspired by the Panoramica Zegna road, featuring artists such as Marracash, Isaac Hempstead Wright, and movement director Yagamoto.

Since 2023, ZEGNA has linked its signature products to wellknown ambassadors, including Kieran Culkin for the Triple Stitch sneakers, and Daniel Brühl for ZEGNA x TES.

In 2023, actor Mads Mikkelsen was named a global ambassador for the brand.
