= Monticchio (mountain) =

Mountain in Italy

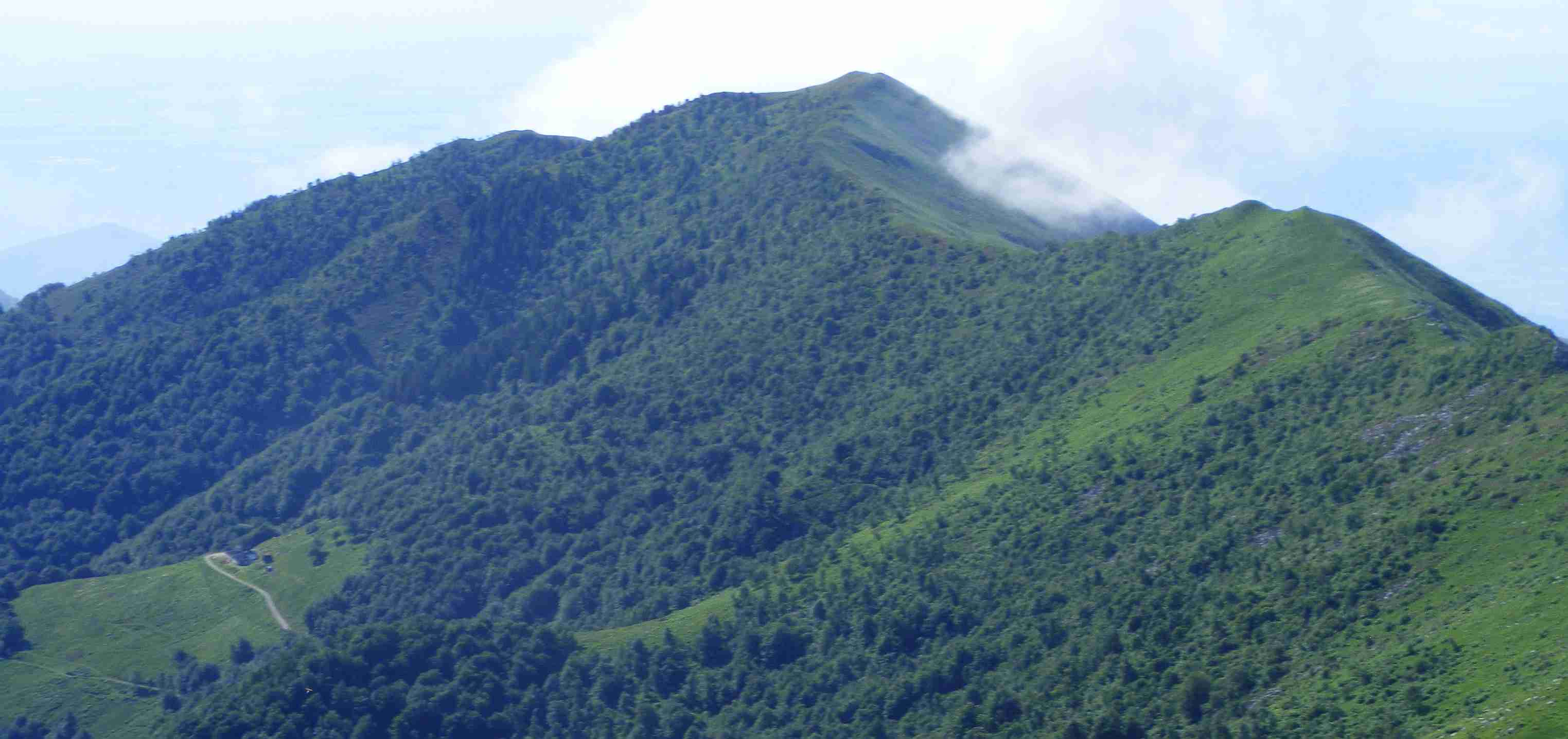
- Monticchio seen from Cima del Bonom

Highest point
- Elevation: 1,697 m (5,568 ft)
- Coordinates: 45°39′49″N 8°02′51″E

Geography
- Location: Piedmont, Italy
- Parent range: Biellese Alps

The Monticchio is a mountain of Piedmont, Italy, with an elevation of 1,697 metres (5,568 ft). It is located in the Biellese Alps, in the Province of Biella.

It lies between the Val Sessera and the Valle Cervo, in the territory of Campiglia Cervo, Veglio and Sagliano Micca. Its northeastern side, descending towards the Val Sessera, is wooded, while the southwestern side, towards the Po plain, is mostly covered in grasslands. The Valle Cervo proper is divided from the Strona di Mosso Valley by a ridge that starts from a subpeak of the Monticchio (1,626 m, about half a kilometre east of the main peak).

The peak, where a geodetic point of the Istituto Geografico Militare is located, can be reached on foot from Bocchetto Sessera or from Piaro, a hamlet of Campiglia Cervo.

The Monticchio is located within the borders of the Oasi Zegna.
