= Cima delle Guardie =

Mountain in Italy

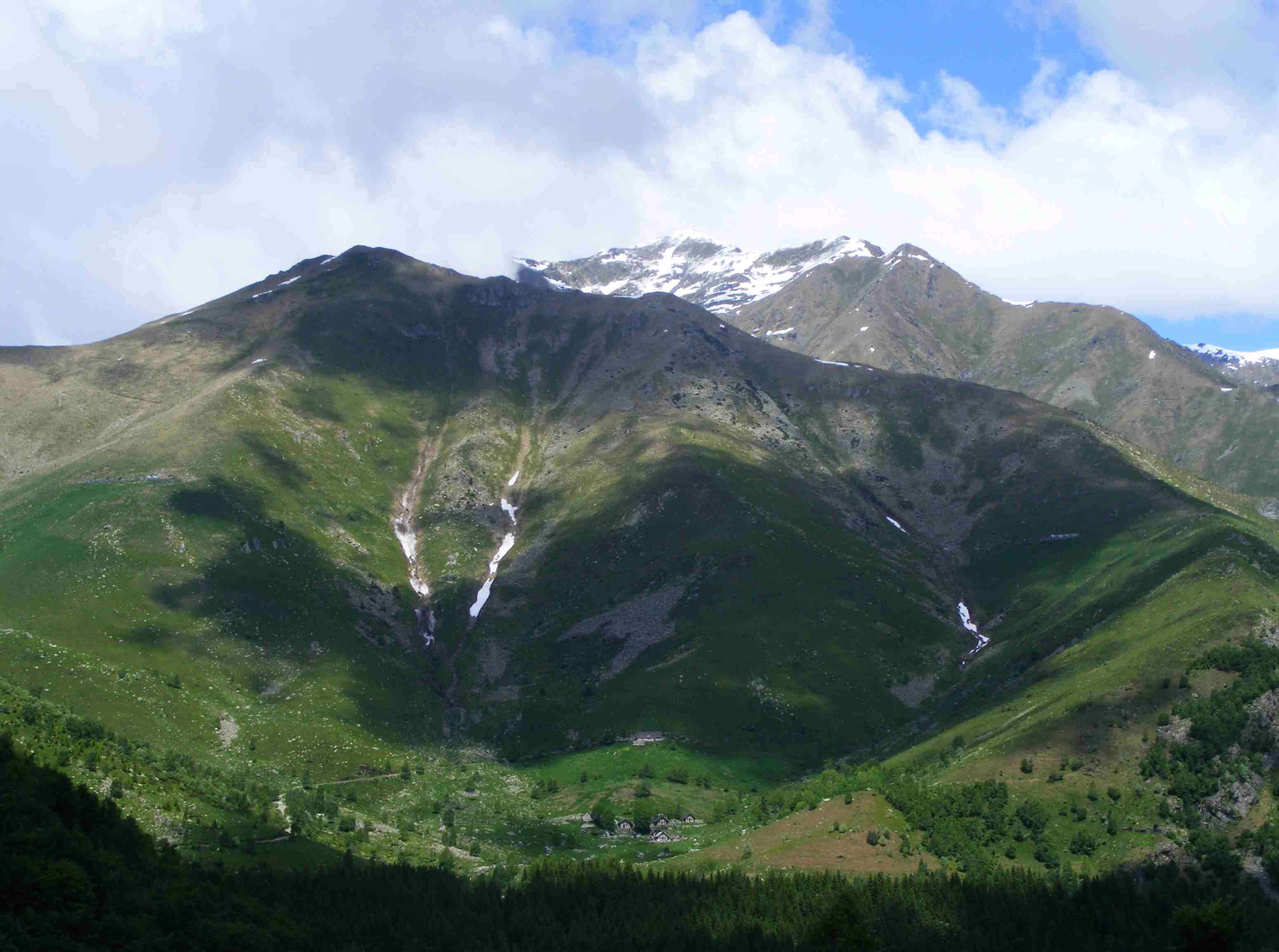

Highest point
- Elevation: 2,007 m (6,585 ft)
- Coordinates: 45°41′22″N 8°01′08″E

Geography
- Location: Piedmont, Italy
- Parent range: Biellese Alps

Cima delle Guardie (Sima dle Guardie in Piedmontese) is a mountain of Piedmont, Italy, with an elevation of 2,007 metres (6,585 ft). It is located in the Biellese Alps, in the Province of Biella.

It lies between the Val Sessera and the Valle Cervo, in the territory of Campiglia Cervo (western side) and Valdilana (eastern side). The peak is at the junction of three ridges: one descends to the north-east towards the Val Sessera; one joins the peak to the Cima del Bonom, to the south; one joins the Cima delle Guardie to the Punta del Cravile, to the north-west.

The peak, can be reached on foot from Bocchetto Sessera or from Forgnengo, a hamlet of Campiglia Cervo.
