= Jackson Wiederhoeft =

Jackson Wiederhoeft is an American fashion designer and artist who in 2019 founded the eponymous label Wiederhoeft. Wiederhoeft previously worked for Thom Browne.
