= Fedeli (company) =

Italian knitwear brand

Luigi Fedeli e Figlio S.r.l.
- Trade name: Fedeli
- Industry: Fashion
- Founded: 1934; 92 years ago
- Owner: Fedeli family (70%); Zegna (15%); Prada (15%)
- Website: www.fedelicashmere.com

Fedeli is an Italian luxury knitwear and apparel company specialising in cashmere. Founded in 1934 in Monza, Italy, the company is active in both men's and women's clothing and remains family-owned, with operations based at its historic headquarters in Monza.

== History ==
=== Early years ===
Fedeli was founded in 1934 in Monza by Luigi Fedeli, initially operating a small manufacturing facility in via Arosio and specialising in hat production. Before World War II, Fedeli was primarily known as a hat manufacturer, with nationwide distribution in Italy. During the German occupation of Italy, the company temporarily ceased operations after refusing to produce military leather garments, and the Fedeli family relocated to Brunate, near Como.

=== Post-war transition to knitwear ===
In the immediate post-war period, the company resumed activity and gradually shifted its focus away from hats toward knitwear production under the leadership of Rodolfo Fedeli (born 1927), son of the founder. In the 1950s and 1960s, the company expanded into women's knitwear, producing classic garments such as cardigans, v-neck sweaters, and roll-neck pullovers. In the early 1960s, Fedeli responded to growing competition from British knitwear brands by investing in new machinery and technologies and expanding its factory in 1962. A collaboration with Roberta di Camerino contributed to the development of innovative knitwear designs that differed from traditional British models.

From the 1970s onward, Fedeli increasingly focused on cashmere, which became a core material in its collections and a central element of its brand identity. Gigi Fedeli officially joined the company in 1979, following a period of training abroad, and later assumed a leading role in guiding its strategic development.

In the early 1990s, Fedeli introduced a men's swimwear line named Swim&Wear. Over time, this line became an integral part of the company's business, with apparel and swimwear each accounting for approximately 50% of total activity by 2017.

=== Acquisition by Zegna and Prada ===
The company has remained under family control and is currently led by the third generation, with Gigi Fedeli, son of the founder, serving as chairman and chief executive officer since 2008. In 2016, Niccolò Fedeli, son of Gigi, joined the company and led its expansion into the United States, opening Fedeli's first showroom in New York.

In 2023, the luxury groups Prada and Ermenegildo Zegna Group each acquired a 15% stake in Fedeli, for a combined total of 30%. The Fedeli family retained 70% ownership of the company. As of the mid-2020s, the company employed over 100 people.
