= Gruppo Dondi =

Italian textile company

Gruppo Dondi is an Italian fabric mill based in Carpi, outside Modena producing soft, breathable, and slightly stretchy wool/cotton "jersey knit" fabrics under named brands Dondi Jersey and Punto Tessile. High-end clothing brands use their textiles to craft unstructured blazers that feel like sweaters but look like traditional sports jackets.

In 2019, Zegna bought a 65% stake in Dondi Jersey, increasing its control over the textile supply chain.
