= Oasi Zegna =

Nature park in Piedmont, Italy

Coordinates: 45.6782°N 8.1553°E

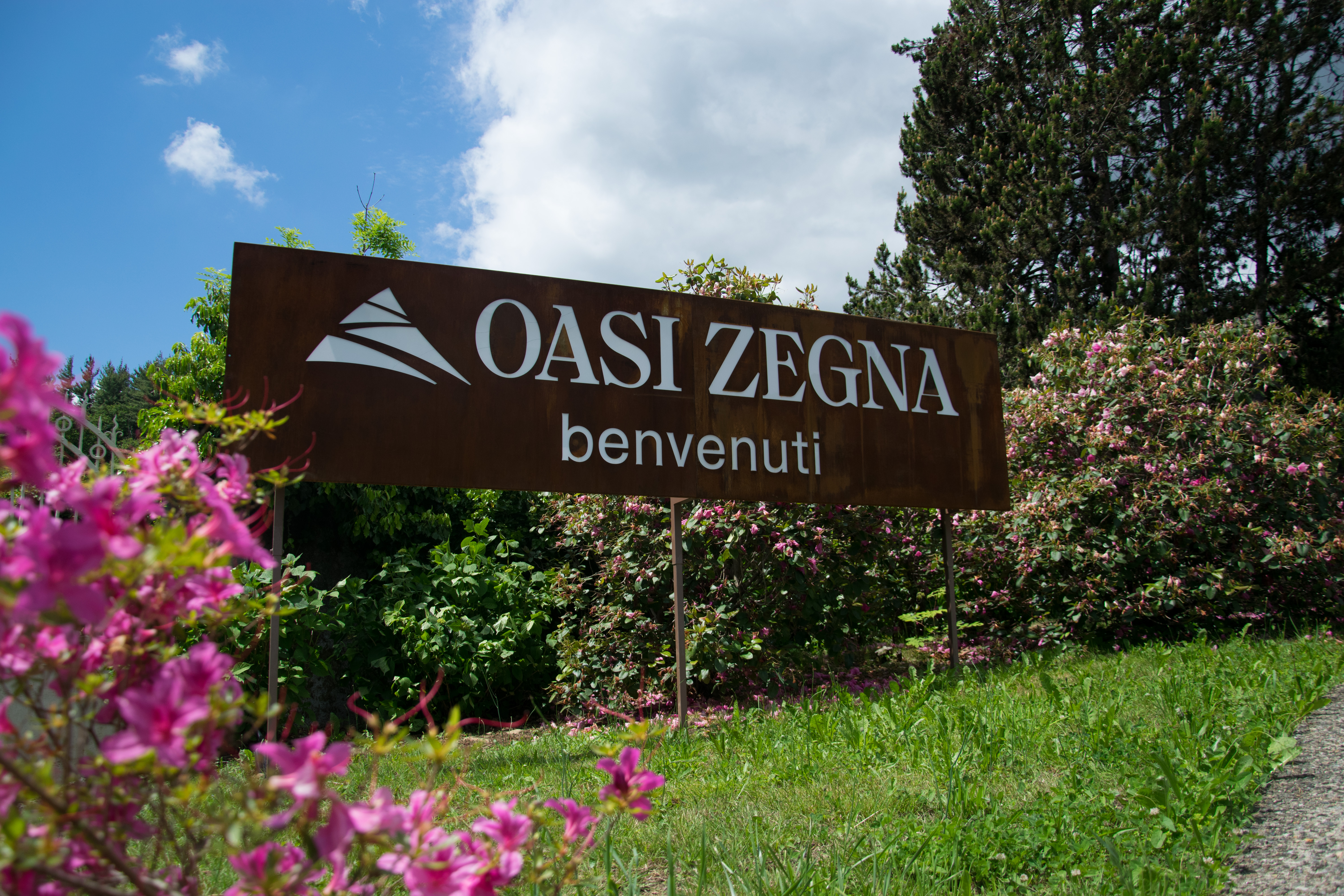
The entrance to the territory of Oasi Zegna

Oasi Zegna is a free access natural territory located in the Biellese Alps, Piedmont, Italy, with an area of about 100 square kilometers. Established in 1993, its roots date back to the 1930s by entrepreneur Ermenegildo Zegna, founder of the Zegna Group and a native of the area where the park stands today.

== History ==
=== The role of Ermenegildo Zegna ===
In the 1930s, Ermenegildo Zegna, who had founded the famous brand of the same name in Trivero in 1910, began to devote himself to social and welfare works aimed at improving the welfare of the community, as well as protecting the environment and promoting his home territories. Among other activities, Zegna promoted the reforestation of the area and had over 500,000 trees planted, laying the foundation for what is now Oasi Zegna.

=== The Panoramica Zegna road ===
In 1938 Zegna began construction of a panoramic road (now named 232 Panoramica Zegna) that still runs through the Oasis offering sweeping views of the surrounding valleys and mountains. In 2021, the Zegna brand paid homage to the road by recalling it in its new logo.

=== The birth of Oasi Zegna project ===
Ermenegildo Zegna's work and his project to enhance and promote the mountains and the environment continued even after his death. In 1993 the area involved became Oasi Zegna, a project created under the initiative of the third generation of the family at the helm of the company, with the goal of creating a true ecosystem that would combine business, environment and local development.

In 2014, Oasi Zegna was awarded the patronage of the FAI Fondo Ambiente Italiano, the National Trust of Italy.

== Oasi Zegna today ==
Oasi Zegna is now a tourist destination, with activities such as trekking, mountain biking, air sports, horseback riding and bird watching. The resort of Bielmonte is also a ski destination.

The area also hosts several land art hosts, including Two Way Mirror - Hedge Arabesque, a glass pavilion located in the Conca dei Rododendri. The work is part of the contemporary art project "ALL'APERTO" (‘OUTDOORS’) promoted by Fondazione Zegna.

In 2015, Oasi Zegna joined the LIFE CARABUS Project, implemented with the support of the European Union to protect biodiversity.

In 2020, the Zegna Forest project, a multi-year plan to safeguard the forest heritage of the Oasis, was launched.

In 2021, Oasi Zegna promoted the Outer EduCampus project, a learning laboratory with the aim of fostering awareness of the balance between man and nature, in the wake of Ermenegildo Zegna's thinking.

In 2022, Oasi Zegna adopted a new logo, featuring the outline of a mountain cut by a road, in reference to the Zegna Panorama that runs through the area and in homage to Ermenegildo's 'green thinking'.

The project has a Scientific Committee consisting of ten environmental experts and scholars.

== Ecomuseum and interesting sites ==
The Oasi Zegna is member of the Biellese territory ecomuseum in order to preserve the pastoral and mountain tradition like beekeeping.

Interesting sites near the Oasi are:

- Brughiera sanctuary
- House-museum in Rosazza, part of the Biellese territory ecomuseum
- Parco degli Arbo in San Paolo Cervo: chestnut park
- Factory of the weel (Fabbrica della Ruota) in the Pray municipality: one of the most important examples of industrial archaeology in Italy
- Hamlet Bonda, in the Mezzana Mortigliengo municipality, with houses painted by contemporary artists.

== Gallery ==
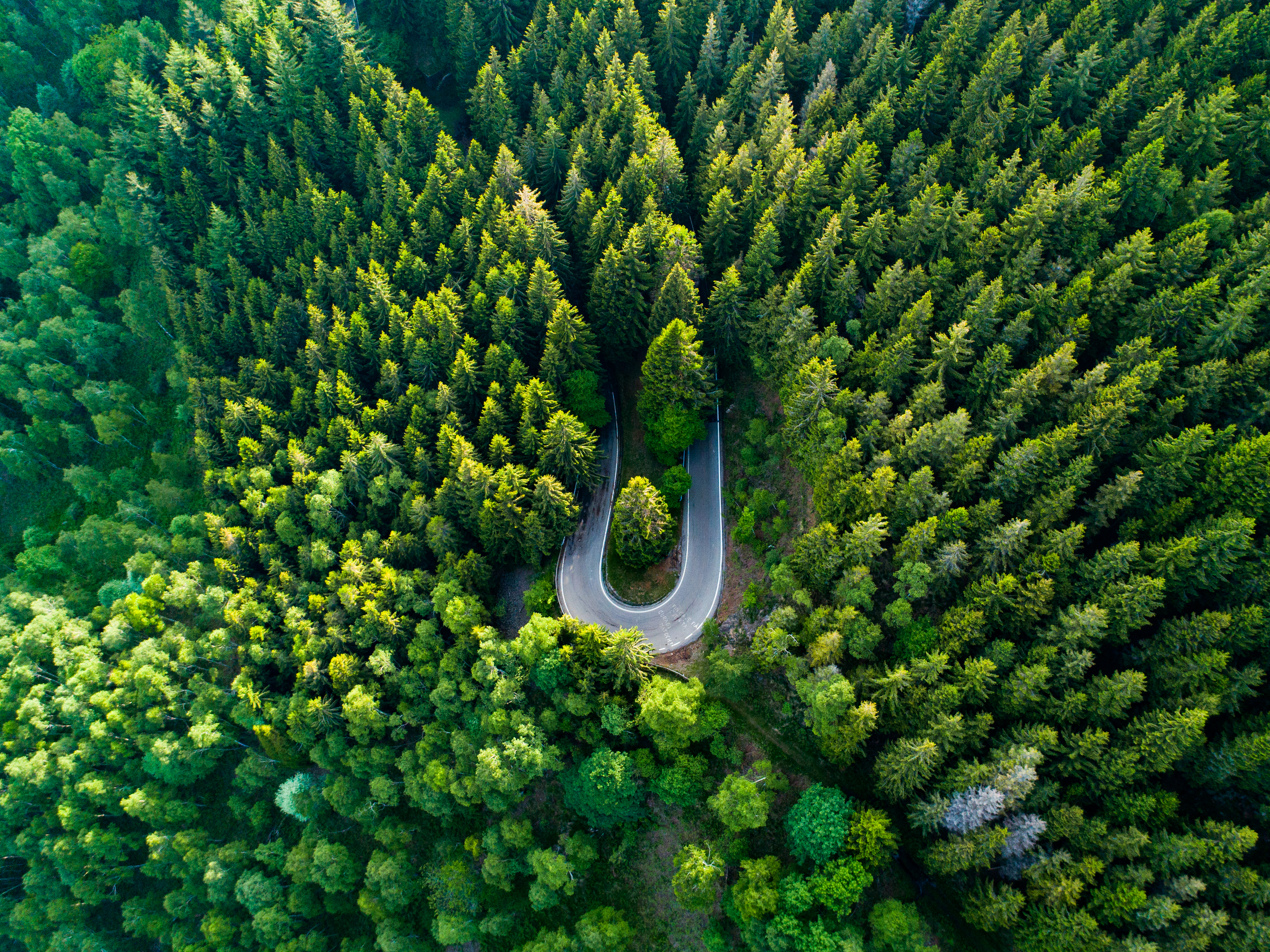
The forests of Oasi Zegna in summertime.

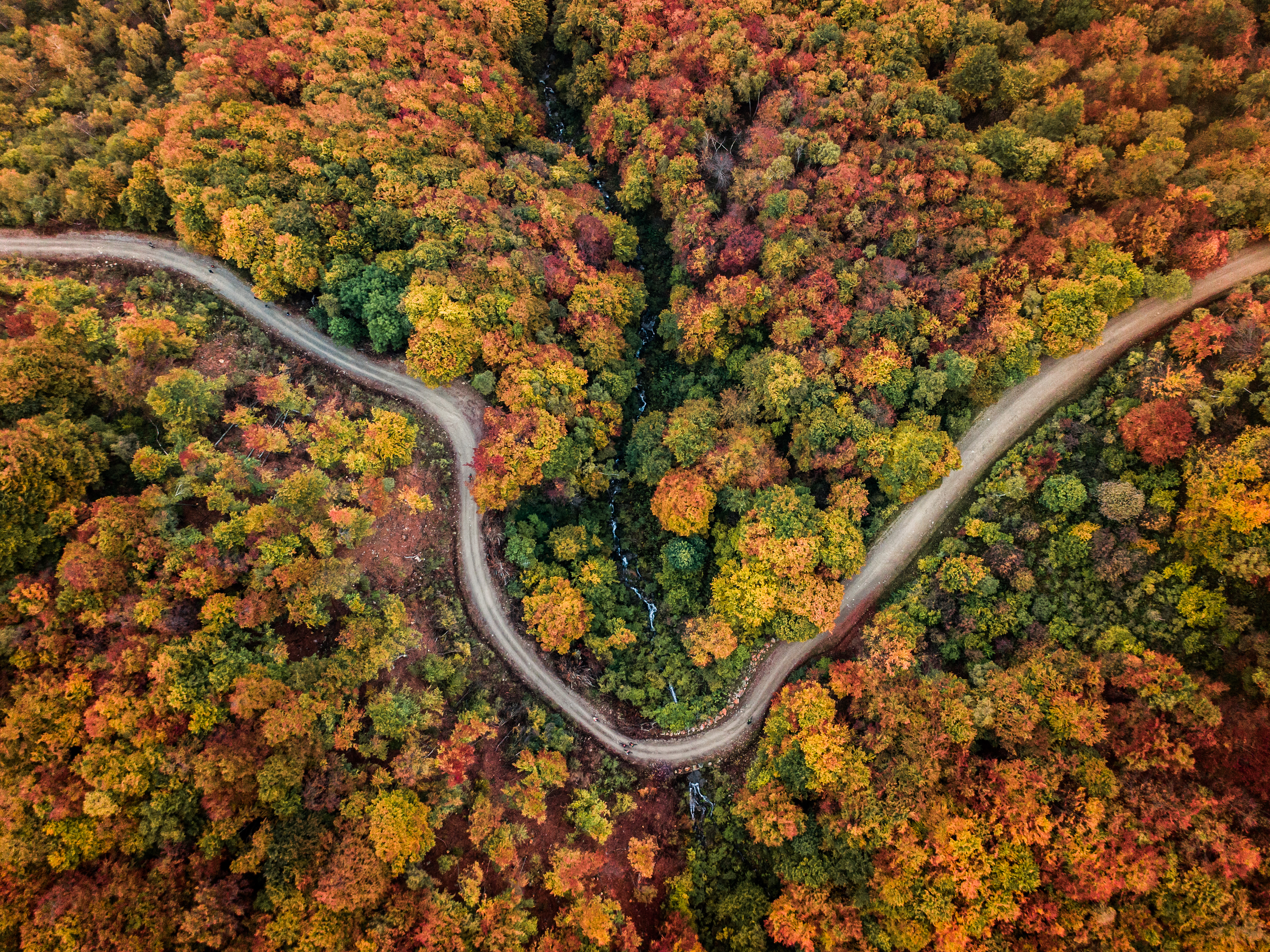
The woods of Oasi Zegna in autumn

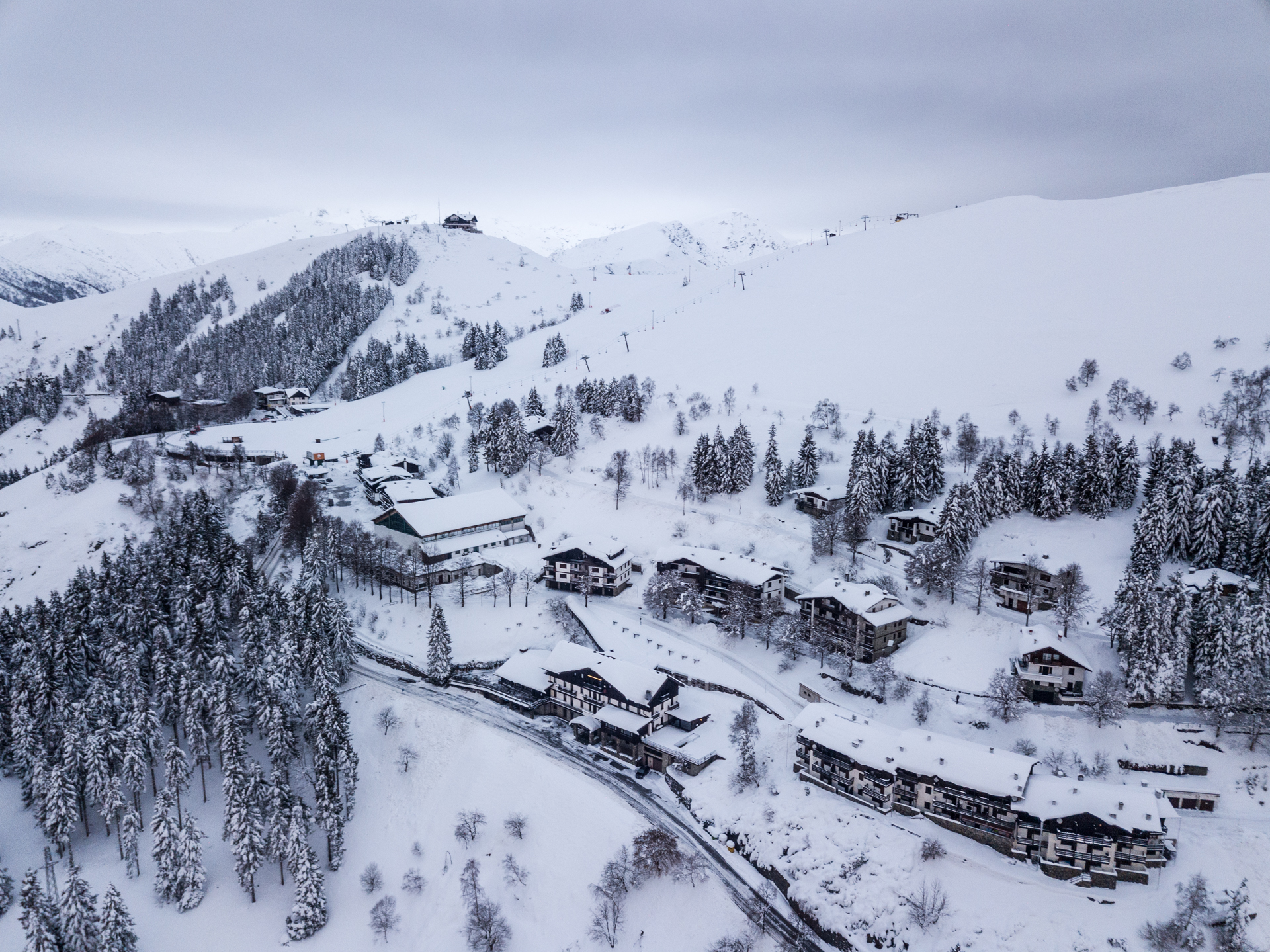
Bielmonte ski resort in wintertime

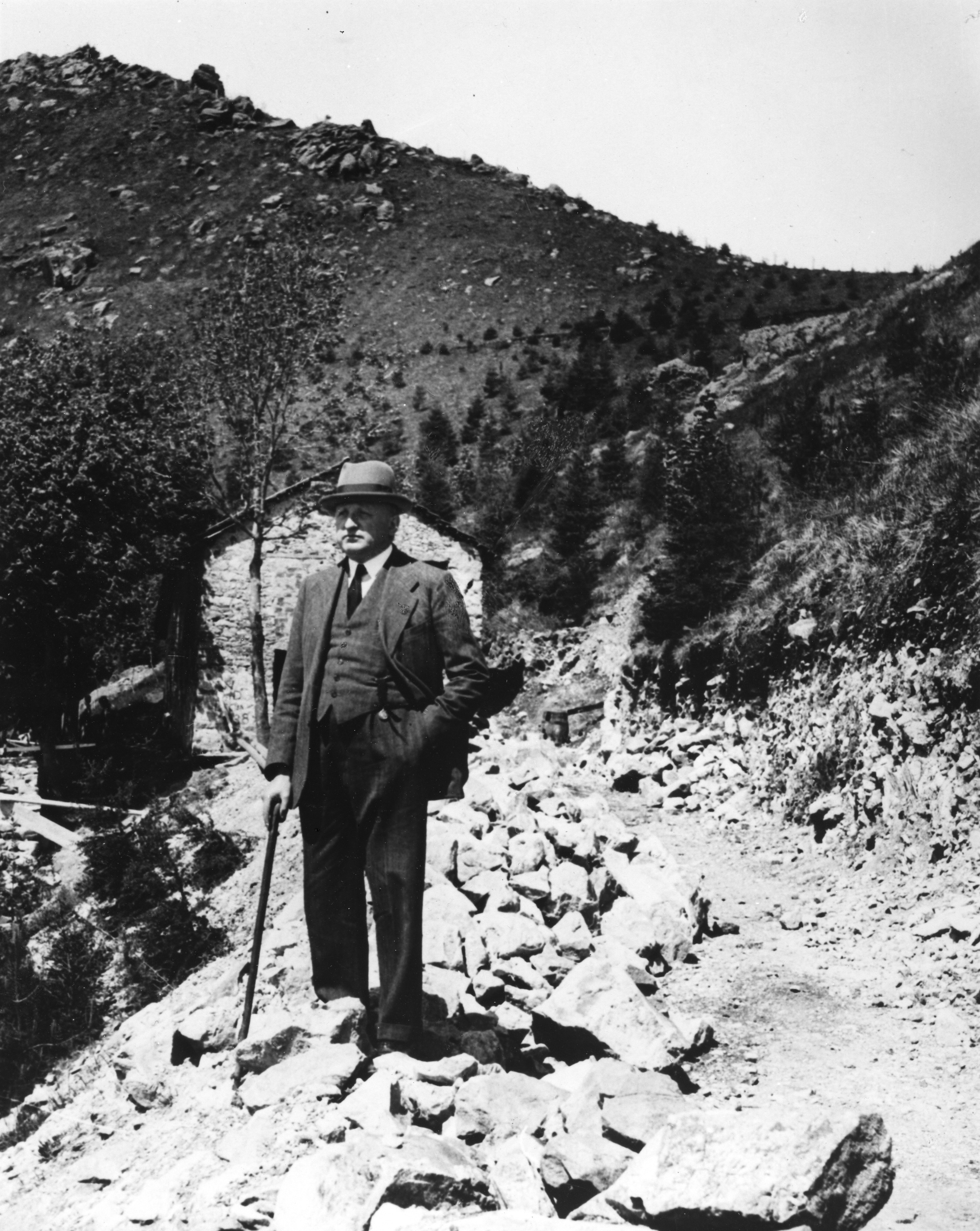
Ermenegildo Zegna along the Panoramica Zegna road under construction, 1950s

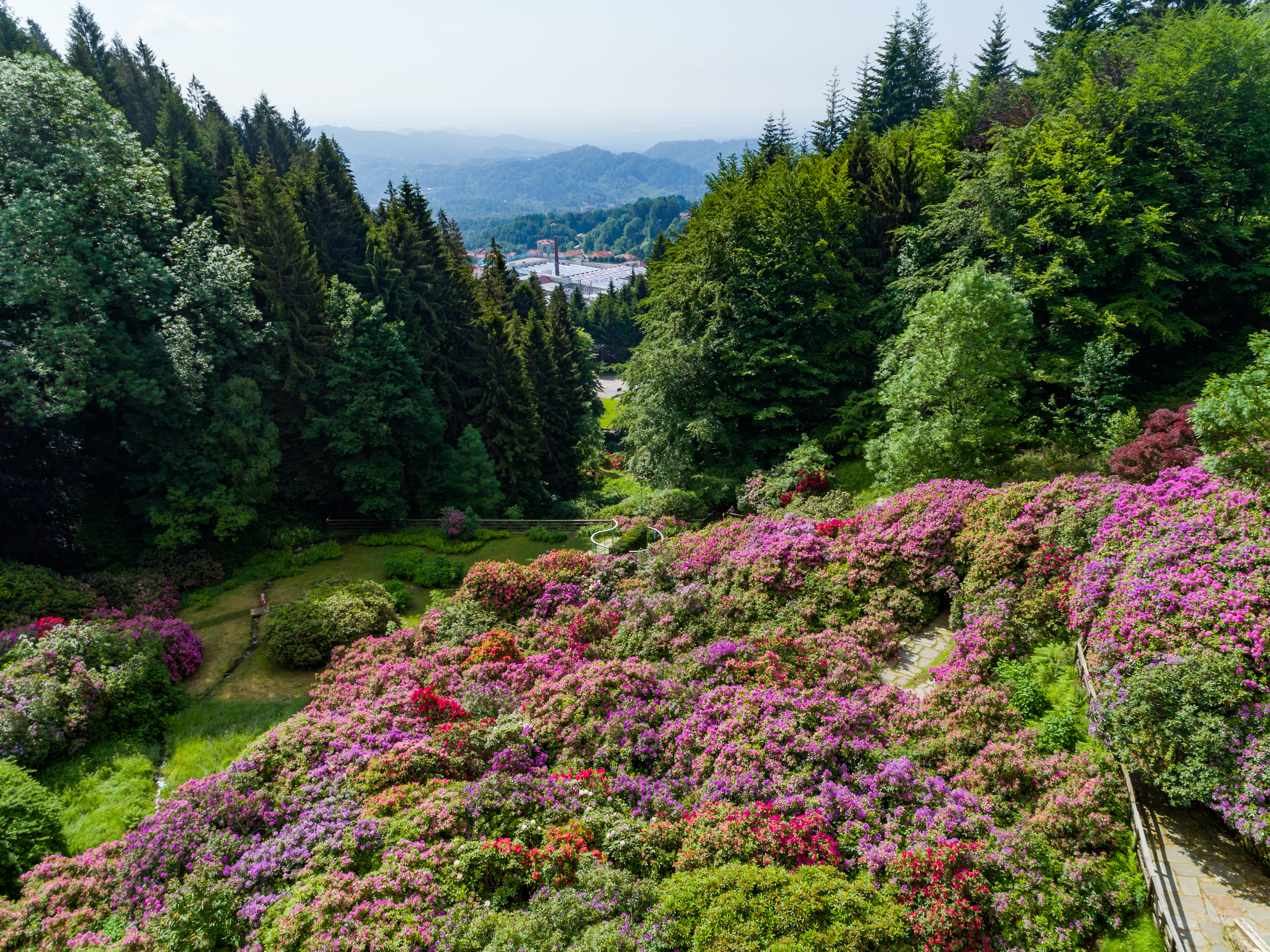
Conca dei Rododendri (Rhododendron Basin) in springtime

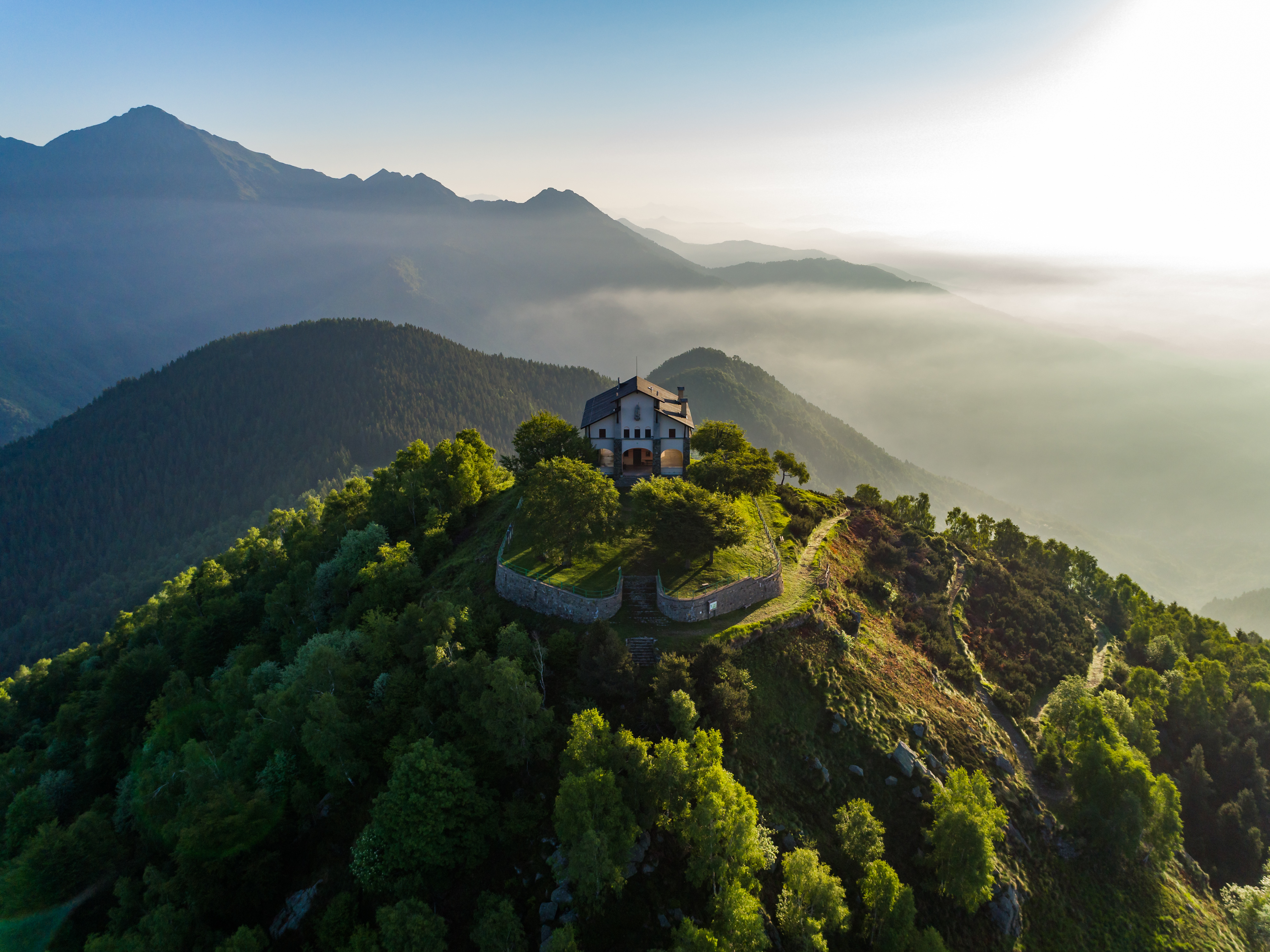
The Saint Bernard Sanctuary

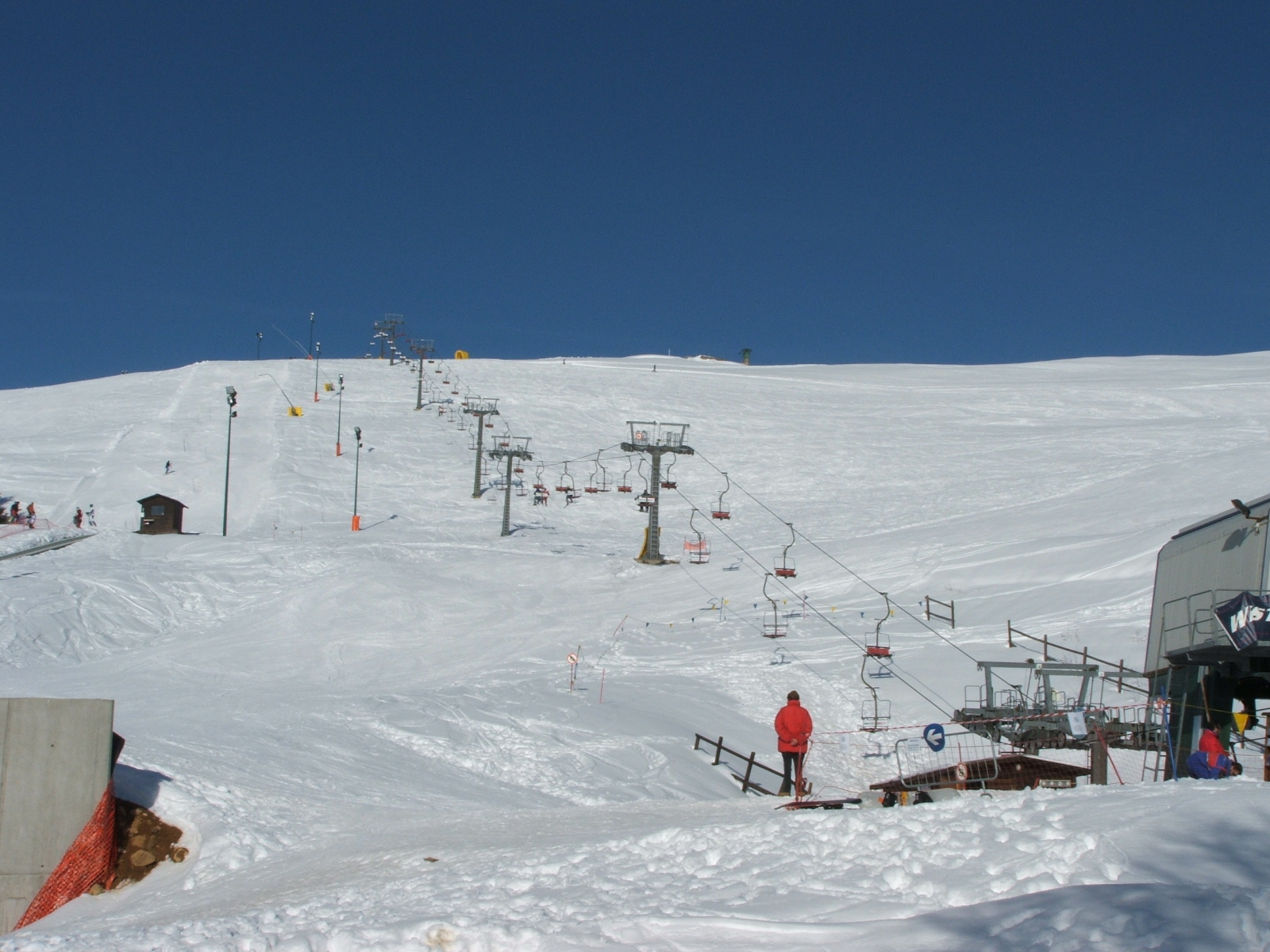
The ski area

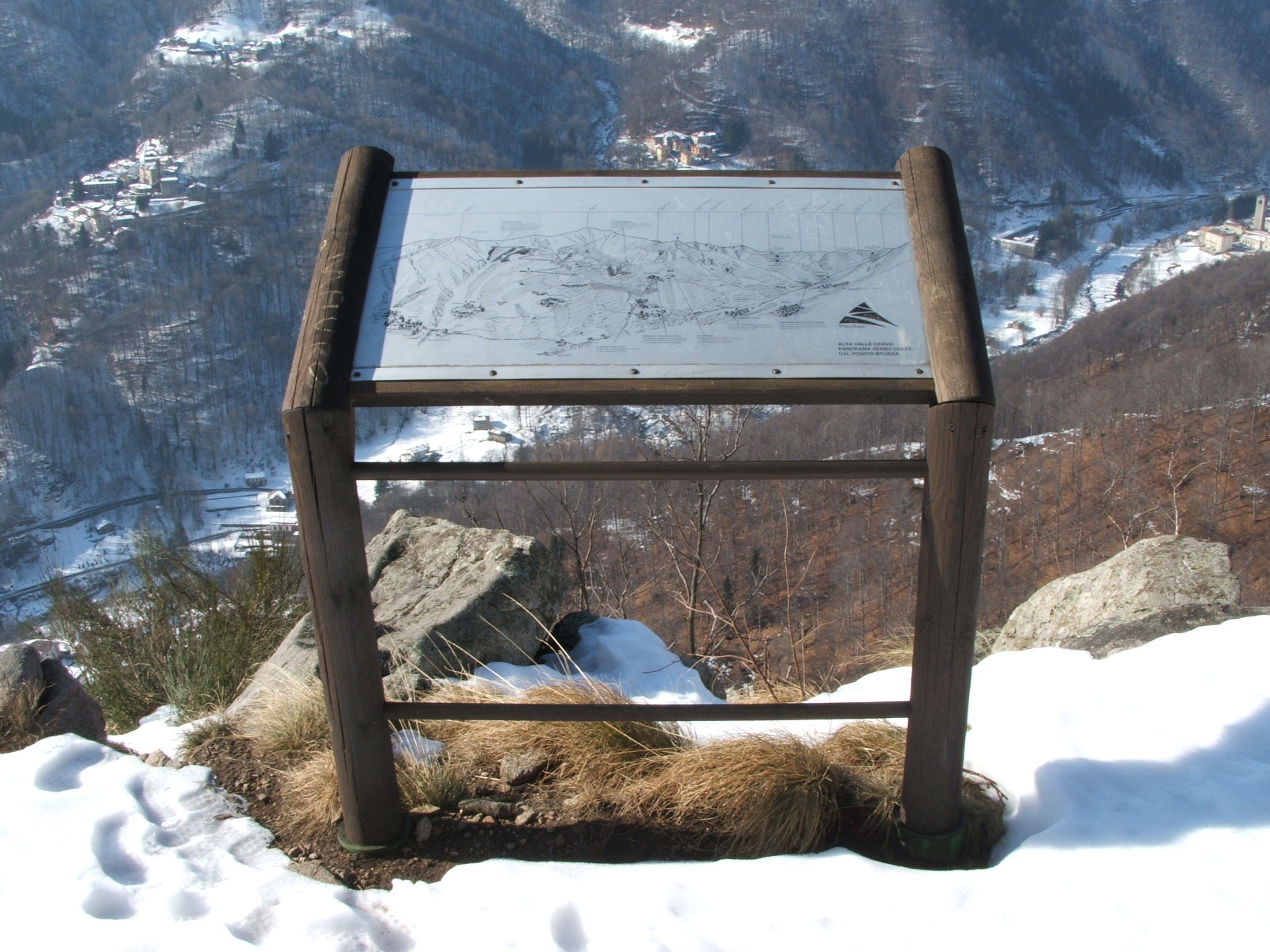
The Panoramica Zegna

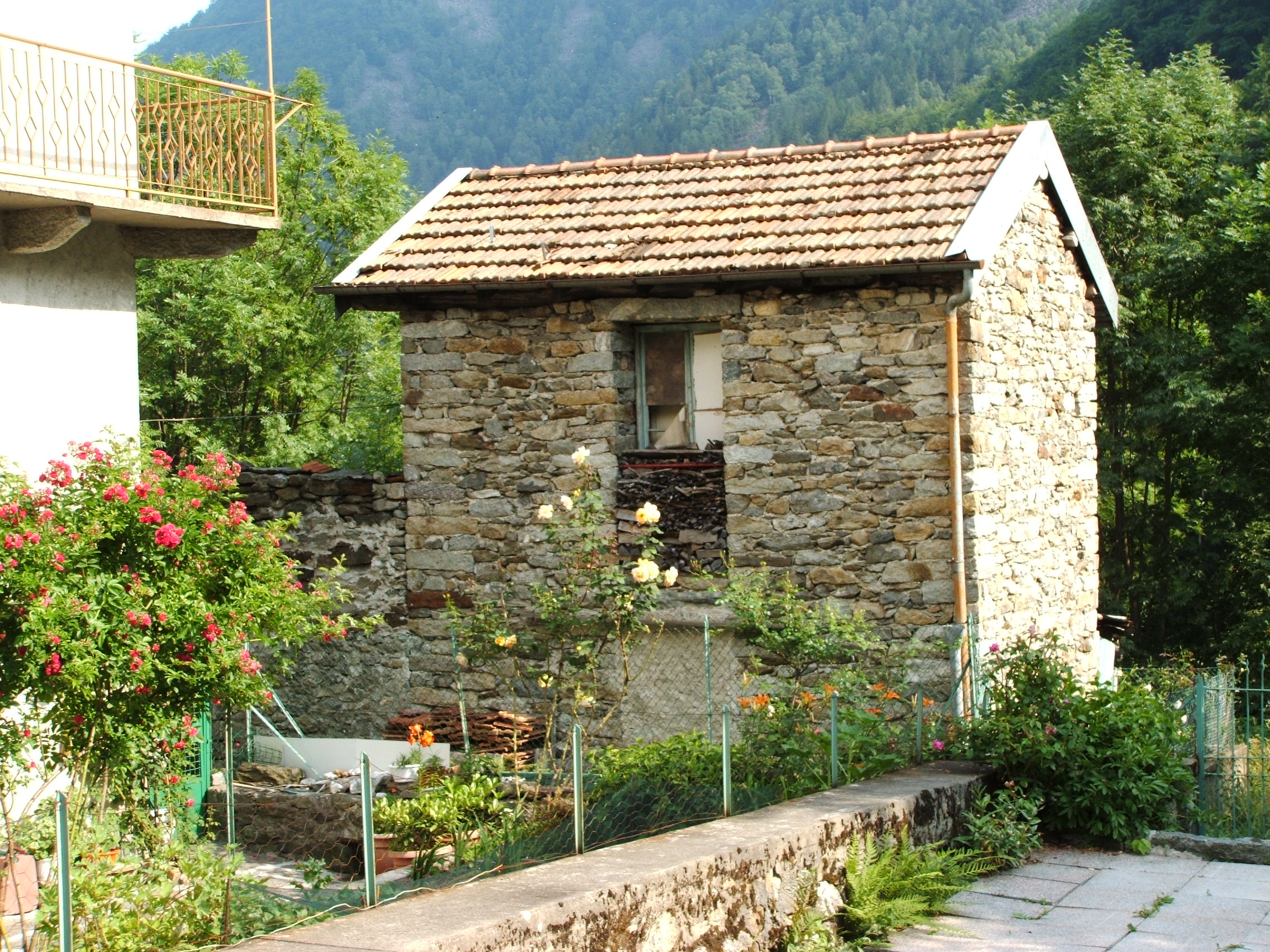
An old house in Cervo Valley

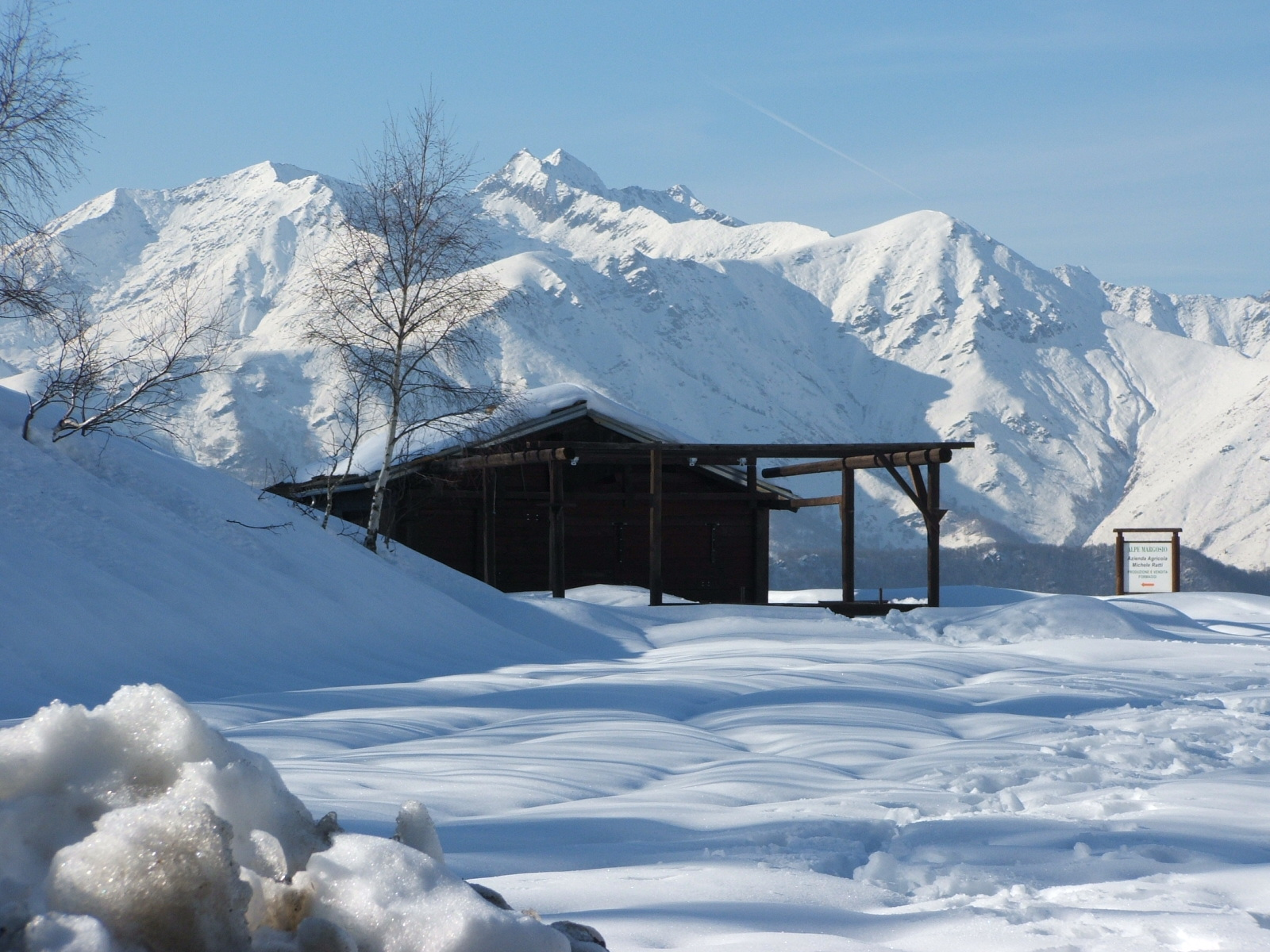
The Sessera Valley

== See also ==
- CoEur - In the heart of European paths
- Path of Saint Charles
- Fra Dolcino
- Valsessera
- Bocchetto Sessera
