= Ermenegildo Zegna (businessman) =

Italian entrepreneur and manager (born 1955)

- Born: 30 September 1955 (age 71); Turin, Italy
- Education: University of London, Harvard Business School
- Occupation: Businessman
- Known for: Chairman and CEO of Ermenegildo Zegna Group; CEO of Thom Browne Inc.; CEO of Tom Ford International
- Awards: Knight of Labour, Leonardo Prize

Ermenegildo "Gildo" Zegna (Italian pronunciation: [(ermene)ˈdʒildо dˈdzeɲɲa]; born 30 September 1955) is an Italian businessman, chairman and CEO of Ermenegildo Zegna Group, which was founded by his grandfather and namesake in 1910 in Trivero.

== Early life and education ==
Gildo is a grandson of Ermenegildo Zegna, who founded the family business in 1910. Born in Turin in 1955 and raised in Biella, Gildo Zegna's father, Angelo, along with his brother Aldo, had been overseeing the business since the mid-1960s. Angelo was the company's honorary chairman until his death in 2021.

Zegna graduated with a degree in economics from the University of London in 1978. In 1981, he completed a managerial program at the Harvard Business School.

== Career ==
Zegna entered the family business in 1982, assuming the role of president of Ermenegildo Zegna Corporation, where he managed the distribution of Zegna products in the U.S. and Canada.

From 1986 to 1989, he was CEO of Italco SA, supervising the distribution of Zegna. products in Spain.

Zegna has been a board member of Ermenegildo Zegna Group since 1989, becoming chief executive officer in 1997.

Under his guidance the Group - born as a textile company which then developed into high-end menswear - has grown to become one of the main global players in the luxury sector, listed on the New York Stock Exchange, also thanks to the acquisition of Thom Browne in 2018 and more recently, in 2023, of the TOM FORD FASHION business.

In December 2021 the Group was listed on the New York Stock Exchange; subsequently, Ermenegildo Zegna also assumed the role of Chairman in addition to that of CEO.

== Assignments and honors ==
Zegna was awarded the title Knight of Labour (Cavaliere del Lavoro) in 2011 by Italian president Giorgio Napolitano.

Besides leading the Zegna Group, Zegna is the chairman at Thom Browne Inc., at Monterubello (the family company) and at Tom Ford International. Additionally, he holds the position of Chairman at Filati Biagioli Modesto. Gildo Zegna is also a member of the Strategic Committee and Advisor of Camera Nazionale della Moda Italiana (The National Chamber for Italian Fashion).

From 2014 to 2018, he was a board member at Fiat Chrysler Automobiles NV.

In 2016, he received the Leonardo Prize from Italian President Sergio Mattarella, a prestigious award given to an Italian personality who has acted in a significant way to promote the image of Italy in the world.

== Personal life ==
He is married and has two sons.

== Honours ==
- Knight of the Order of Merit for Labour (May 30, 2011)
