= Zegna =

Italian luxury fashion house

Ermenegildo Zegna N.V.
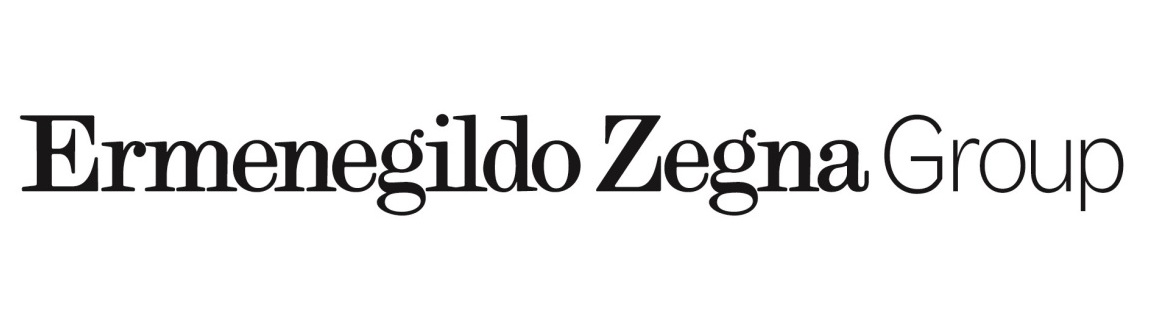
- Trade name: Ermenegildo Zegna Group
- Type: Public
- Traded as: NYSE: ZGN
- Industry: Fashion and textiles
- Founded: 1910; 116 years ago in Trivero, Italy
- Founder: Ermenegildo Zegna
- Headquarters: Milan, Italy 45.6689°N 8.1610°E
- Area served: Worldwide
- Key people: Ermenegildo Zegna (Chairman); Gianluca Tagliabue (CEO); Sam Lobban (CEO, Thom Browne); Lelio Gavazza (CEO, TOM FORD FASHION); Alessandro Sartori (Artistic Director, ZEGNA); Thom Browne (Founder & CCO, Thom Browne)
- Revenue: ▲€1,904 million (2023)
- Operating income: ▲€208 million (2023)
- Net income: ▲€136 million (2023)
- Total assets: ▲€2,767 million (2023)
- Total equity: ▲€901 million (2023)
- Owner: Zegna family
- Number of employees: 7,395 (2024)
- Subsidiaries: ZEGNA; Thom Browne; TOM FORD FASHION; Filiera (Lanificio Ermenegildo Zegna, Tessitura di Novara, Pettinatura di Verrone, Bonotto, Cappellificio Cervo, Dondi, Tessitura Ubertino, Filati Biagioli Modesto and Luigi Fedeli e Figlio)
- Website: zegnagroup.com

Ermenegildo Zegna N.V., also known as Zegna Group, Ermenegildo Zegna Group, or simply Zegna (Italian pronunciation: [ˈdzeɲɲa]), is an Italian luxury fashion house headquartered in Milan. It was founded in 1910 by Ermenegildo Zegna in Trivero, Biella, in the Piedmont region of northern Italy. It is led by the Zegna family and is a public company that is listed on the New York Stock Exchange.

== History ==
=== Foundation and early years ===
The origins of the family business date back to the late 19th and early 20th centuries, when Michelangelo "Angelo" Zegna (1859–1923), a watchmaker from Trivero, Biella, decided to open a textile factory in the nearby town of Flecchia. In 1910, three of Angelo's ten children, including the youngest Ermenegildo (born in 1892), along with a fourth partner, Costanzo Giardino Vitri, founded the wool mill Zegna & Giardino in Trivero in the Biellese Alps. With the early departure of Vitri and one of the brothers, Ermenegildo took the helm from the beginning, joined by his brother Mario until the early 1940s.

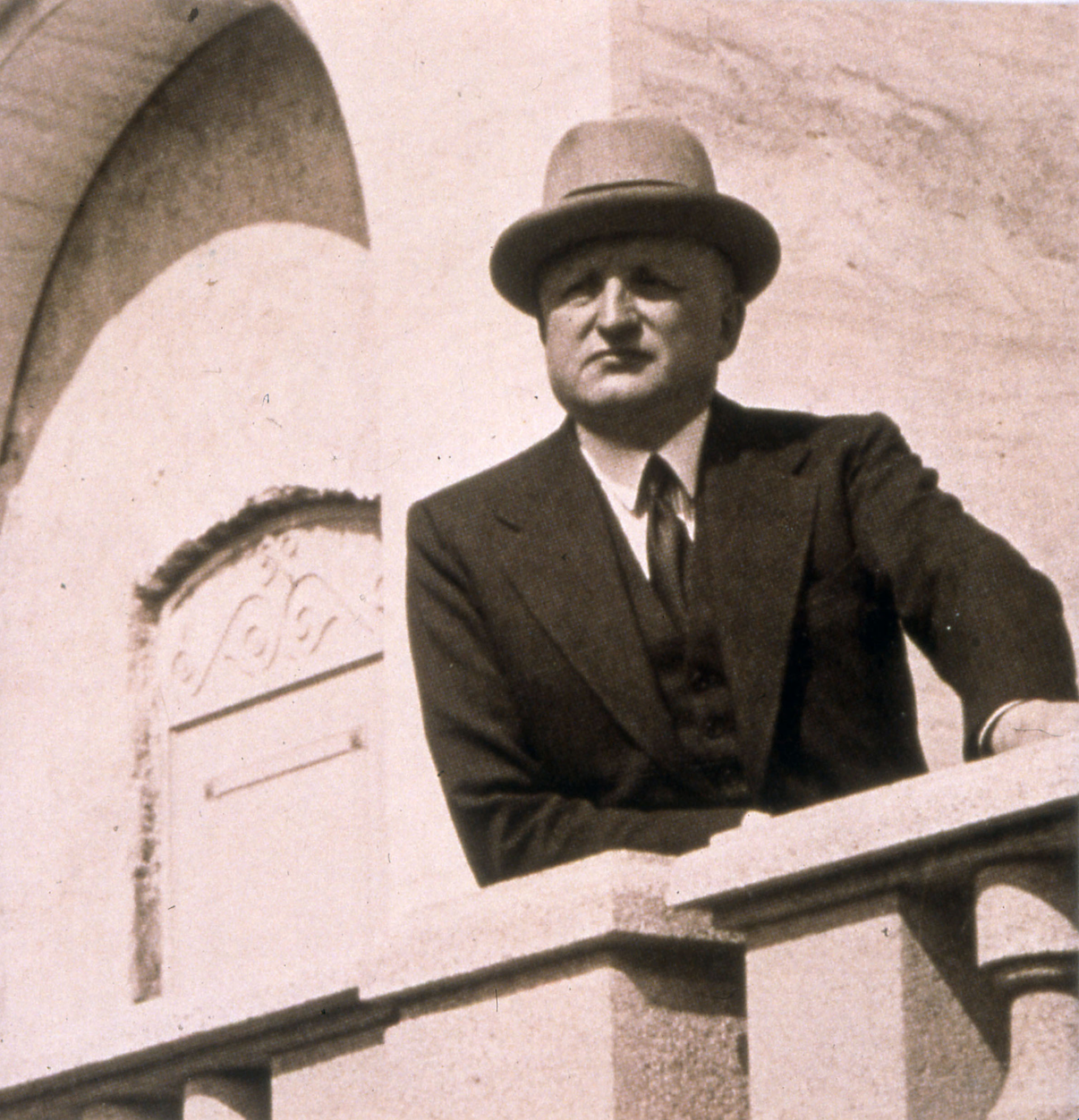
Ermenegildo Zegna (1892–1966)

=== Growth ===
Zegna's vision was to create high-quality fabrics, so he began to source wool directly from several countries around the world, such as Mongolia, Australia, and South Africa; he also bought modern machinery from England.

During the Interwar period, Zegna's business started to flourish. In the late 1920s, the Lanificio (wool mill) employed more than 700 workers, growing to more than 1,000 in the late 1930s. In 1938 the company began to export fabrics in the US, through its subsidiary Zegna Woollens Corporation established in New York City.

In 1942, Ermenegildo's sons Aldo (born in 1920) and Angelo (born in 1924) entered the company, which was renamed Ermenegildo Zegna and Sons. In the mid-1950s, the company employed 1,400 workers.

=== Second generation ===
Ermenegildo Zegna's sons, Aldo and Angelo, took over the company in the mid-1960s. Under their guidance, the label both expanded its business to ready-made suits and established new plants and distribution networks abroad. In 1968, the first factory producing sleeve-units and trousers was opened in Novara, followed by openings in Spain, Greece, and Switzerland. Sales and marketing departments were also established in France, Germany, the U.K., and the U.S.

In 1972, Zegna launched its made-to-measure service called Su Misura.

Zegna's attention to wool quality continued through 1960s and 1970s, as the company established the Wool Awards in Australia (1963) and the Mohair Trophy in South Africa (1970).

The international development strategy run by the Zegna brothers brought to the openings of the first owned boutique in Paris in 1980, followed by Milan in 1985. In 1991 Zegna became the first luxury label to open a store in China.

=== Third generation ===
==== 1990s to present ====
During the 1990s, the third generation of the Zegna family entered the business. Angelo's son, and namesake of the company's founder, Ermenegildo "Gildo" Zegna, became CEO of the Group in 1997; his cousin Paolo became the chairman. Under their governance, the company began a strategy of brand extension and full verticalization.

From 1990 to 2020, Zegna held the majority in women's fashion brand Agnona brand; it was subsequently sold to the Aimone family, another branch of the Zegna family, with the Zegna group keeping 30 percent.

In 1991 Zegna was the first luxury brand to enter the China market, with a flagship store in Beijing; and one of the first to access the Indian market.

In 2008, the Group established its new headquarters in Milan, in a building designed by architects Antonio Citterio and Gianmaria Beretta.

==== Acquisitions ====
Starting from the late 1990s, the Group began a series of acquisitions of Italian and foreign companies that have expanded its business scope and now form the "Filiera", a unique, company-owned and controlled entity composed of select Italian textile producers.

In 2009, the Ermenegildo Zegna Group acquired a majority stake in Tessitura di Novara, a company specialized in high-quality silk weaving.

In 2012, it acquired a minority stake in Pettinatura di Verrone, a company specializing in the combing of fine wools and natural fibers.

In 2014, Zegna acquired the majority of Achill, an Australian wool farm counting about 12,500 sheep in its flock.

In 2016, the Group acquired a majority stake in Bonotto, a high-end textile manufacturer based in Molvena, Vicenza, giving the Group the possibility to explore new areas such as furnishing and experimental fabrics.

Two years later, Zegna – through its subsidiary ZECA company – took over the historic Cappellificio Cervo hat-maker.

In 2018, Zegna – already present in India with three stores – together with Reliance, acquired a stake into Indian fashion designer Raghavendra Rathore's firm.

In 2018 Zegna announced that they purchased 85% of the eponymously named Thom Browne, a New York City-based menswear and womenswear brand, founded in 2001.

In 2019, Zegna bought a 65% stake of Italian jersey fabrics manufacturer Dondi Jersey, increasing its control over the textile supply chain.

In June 2021, the Zegna Group bought a 60% majority stake in Tessitura Ubertino, a high-end fabric maker based in Piedmont. A few weeks later, Zegna also bought a 40% share in Tessitura Biagioli Modesto, an Italian spinning mill specialized in cashmere production.

In 2023, the Prada Group and the Ermenegildo Zegna Group announced an agreement to acquire a minority stake in Luigi Fedeli e Figlio S.r.l., an Italian family-owned company founded in 1934 in Monza, now in its third generation, recognized worldwide as an excellence in Made in Italy knitwear in fine yarns.

==== Stock exchange listing ====
In 2021, Zegna agreed to go public by combining with a US special-purpose acquisition company launched by European private equity group Investindustrial.

On 20 December 2021, the Zegna Group went public in New York with a valuation of $3.1 billion and a market capitalization of $2.4 billion . It is the first Italian fashion company to be listed in New York.

The Zegna family retains control of the company with 60.3% of the capital, held directly by Ermenegildo Zegna and the family company, Monterubello SS. Further shareholders include Temasek, holding a 10% stake, and Investindustrial Acquisition Corp., which holds an 11% stake. A total of 19% of the company is publicly traded. Since 2022, the company's legal headquarters have been in the Netherlands, while its operational headquarters remain in Italy.

== Brands ==
Logo since 2021

The Ermenegildo Zegna Group operates in the market through three complementary brands: ZEGNA, Thom Browne, and TOM FORD FASHION.

=== ZEGNA ===
ZEGNA was founded in 1910 as a textile company ("Lanificio Zegna"). Formerly known as Ermenegildo Zegna, in 2021, in parallel with the Group's stock market listing, the brand name became simply ZEGNA. A new logo was also adopted, referencing the road from which it all began, in homage to the founder’s vision and commitment, who in the 1930s promoted the construction of the provincial road 232 Panoramica Zegna, crossing the company’s original territories.

In 2003 Zegna entered the fragrance market. Over the years, it has also signed partnerships with other major brands such as Maserati, Marcolin and Real Madrid.

Since June 2016, the artistic director of ZEGNA has been Alessandro Sartori, who is entrusted with the creative functions of all ZEGNA brands.

In 2021, Zegna branded products accounted for 66% of Group revenues.

=== Thom Browne ===
Thom Browne is a New York City-based luxury fashion brand, founded by American designer Thom Browne in 2001. Ermenegildo Zegna Group acquired an 85% stake in Thom Browne in August 2018, at a $500 million valuation. The founder retained the role of Chief Creative Officer of the company.

The brand is offered in some 300 stores in 40 countries; in 2021, it accounted for 20% of Group revenues.

=== TOM FORD FASHION ===
As of 29 April 2023, following completion of the acquisition of Tom Ford International, Ermenegildo Zegna Group acquired from Estée Lauder the license for the Tom Ford brands for men’s and women’s lines, accessories, lingerie, fine jewelry, children’s clothing, home textiles, and design products. The contract has a twenty-year term and includes an automatic renewal for an additional decade.

=== Filiera ===
The Ermenegildo Zegna Group controls the entire value chain of its products, from the purchase of raw materials through fabric production to the design and sale of finished products. The Group controls and participates in nine companies known as the Filiera, comprising Italian textile manufacturers specializing in all areas of interest.

==== Lanificio Ermenegildo Zegna ====
Lanificio Ermenegildo Zegna ("Ermenegildo Zegna Wool Mill") is located in Trivero, in the Piedmont region of Northern Italy. It was founded by Ermenegildo Zegna in 1910, when he was 18. Under the Zegna Group supervision, shorn fleeces coming from several countries are processed at the Lanificio, combining artisanal activities and modern technologies, from raw material to finishing.

==== Tessitura di Novara ====
Founded in 1932 by Luigi Baldi in Pernate, a fraction of the municipality of Novara, it is a silk-weaving company specialized in the production of cashmere, pure silk, and high-end natural fabrics. It was acquired by Zegna in 2009.

==== Pettinatura di Verrone ====
Founded in 1960, Pettinatura di Verrone is a combing mill based in the textile district of Biella and specialized in combing superfine wools, cashmere, and vicuña. In 2009, Zegna, Loro Piana and Marzotto acquired a 15% stake each of the company.

==== Bonotto ====
Originally founded in 1912 as a straw hats maker, Bonotto was converted in a textile manufacturer by Nicla Donazzan and Luigi Bonotto in 1972. In 2016, Zegna Group acquired a controlling stake in the company. Bonotto is known for following a "slow factory" model, aiming at craftsmanship and rejecting standardization and low cost chain production. Bonotto is also famous for the rich archive of its Foundation, which houses over 24,000 works of art.

==== Cappellificio Cervo ====
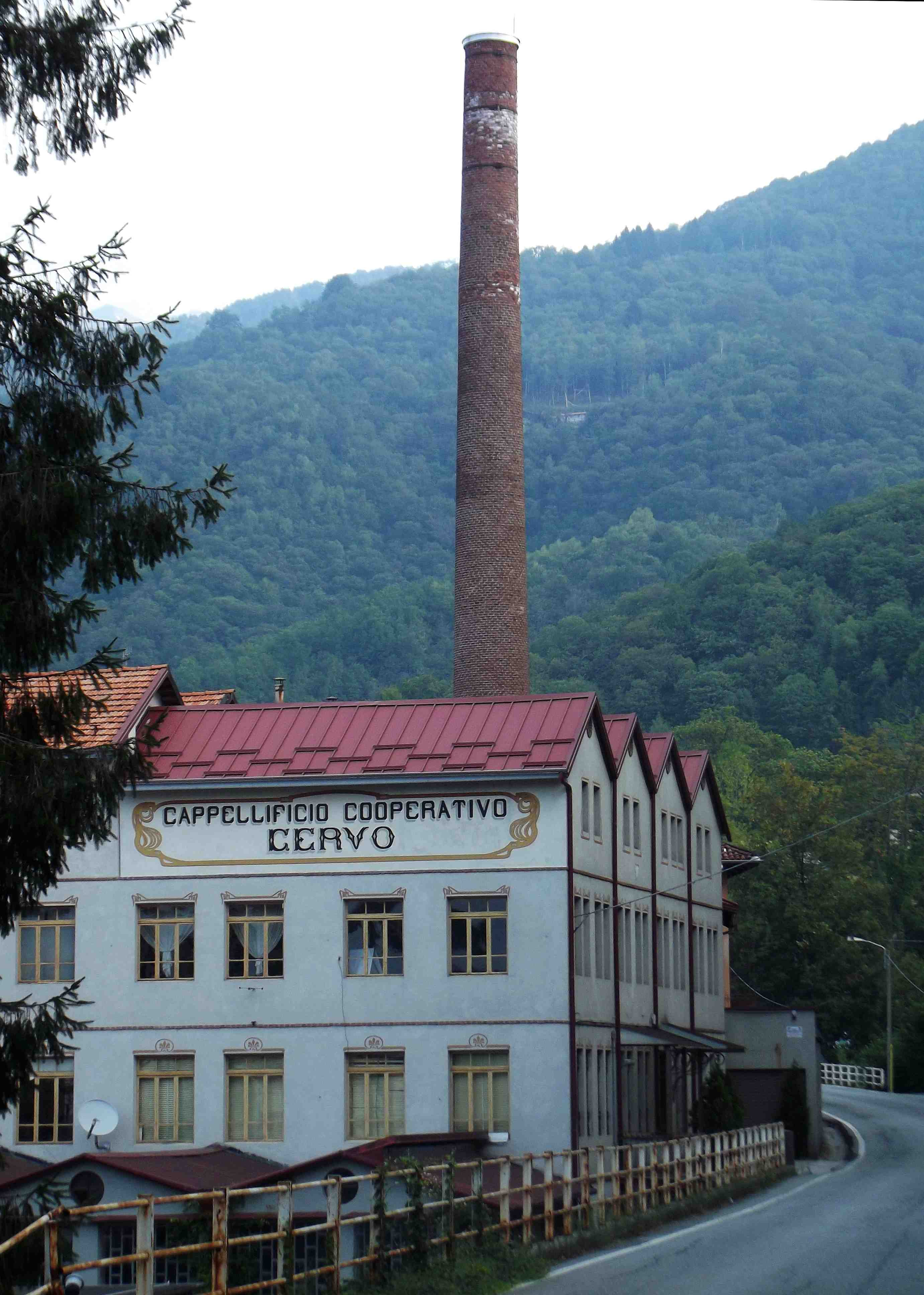
Cappellificio Cervo

Based in Sagliano Micca (Biella), Cappellificio Cervo is a historic hattery (founded in 1897) acquired by Zegna-controlled ZECA company in 2018, with the aim of relaunching it, in partnership with entrepreneur Vincenzo Caldesi and Artigiana Cappellai.

==== Dondi ====
Based in the Carpi textile hub, near Modena, Dondi was founded in the 1970s as Dondi Jersey and is a renowned manufacturer of high-end knitwear for men and women. In July 2019, the Zegna group acquired a 65% stake in Dondi, while the remaining 35% is retained by the Dondi Capelli family who still runs the business, being responsible for the management and creative direction of the company.

==== Tessitura Ubertino ====
Tessitura Ubertino is a fabric maker specialized in high-end fabrics for womenswear, such as tweed and jacquard. It was founded in 1981 by Adalgiso Ubertino and is based near Biella. In June 2021, the Ermenegildo Zegna Group acquired a 60% stake in the company; the two sons of founder Adalgiso Ubertino have retained a 40% stake as well as the management and creative direction.

==== Filati Biagioli Modesto ====
Founded in 1919 as a spinning business by Modesto Biagioli's father, it became Filati Biagioli Modesto in 1967. The company is based in Montale (Pistoia) and is considered a world leader in the production of high-quality yarns. In 2021 Zegna Group and Prada Group jointly acquired the majority shareholding in Filati Biagioli Modesto, a company specialized in cashmere and other noble yarns. Zegna CEO Gildo Zegna was appointed chairman.

==== Luigi Fedeli e Figlio ====
Founded in 1934 in Monza, Fedeli specializes in the creation of high-quality knitwear. In a joint operation in 2023, Zegna and Prada each acquired a 15% stake in the company. According to the agreement, Gildo Zegna and Patrizio Bertelli joined the company's board of directors.

== Financial data ==
Ermenegildo Zegna Group is the largest men's luxury fashion brand in the world by revenue. As of 2021, Ermenegildo Zegna operated over 500 retail stores across the world. In 2023, it reported revenues of €1.9 billion and a net profit of €135.7 million. Approximately 35% of sales were generated in the EMEA region, 41% in APAC, 22% in North America, and 2% in Latin America.

== Corporate governance ==
In 2021, the Group has become a public company. Consequently, Ermenegildo (Gildo) Zegna, grandson of founder Ermenegildo, took on the role of chairman, while his cousins Paolo and Anna Zegna joined the board of directors. From 1st January 2026, Gianluca Tagliabue has been nominated Group CEO.

== Social commitment ==
The Ermenegildo Zegna Group is particularly active in corporate social responsibility, which began in the 1930s when the founder distinguished himself for promoting a series of social welfare initiatives in favor of the Trivero community.

In 1993, the Oasi Zegna was established in the Biellese Alps, a natural area of 100 square kilometers where over 500,000 conifers were planted in the late 1930s during the construction of the panoramic road.

== Archive ==
Since 2007, the historical archive of the Group has been preserved at Casa Zegna in Trivero. It is a comprehensive archival center that houses documents, photographs, technical drawings, sample books, and objects generated over more than a hundred years of industrial activity.
