= Sessera Valley =

- Valle Sessera
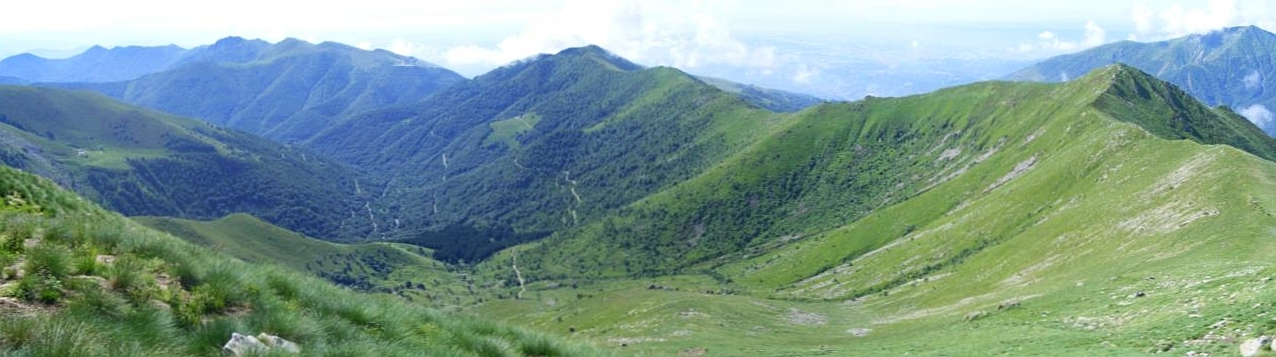
- The valley seen from Cime delle Guardie

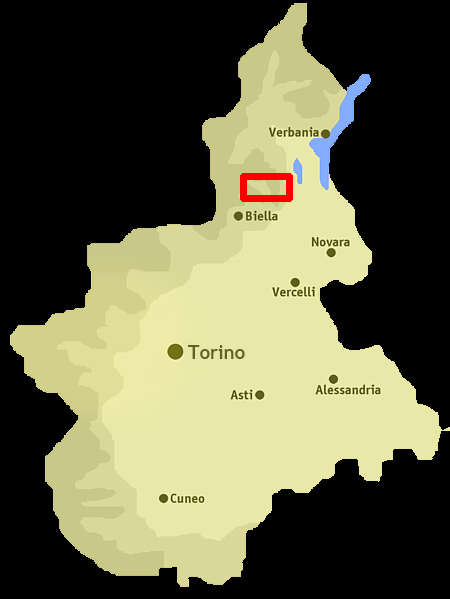
- Location of the valley in Piedmont, NW Italy
- Floor elevation: 450–2,556 m (1,476–8,386 ft)
- Length: around 20 km (12 mi) west east

Geology
- Type: River valley

Geography
- Location: Province of Biella, Piedmont, Italy
- Coordinates: 45°43′00″N 8°14′00″E

Sessera Valley (in Italian Valle Sessera) is a valley in north-east of Piedmont in the Province of Biella, Italy.

== Etymology ==
The valley takes its name from the river Sessera, a right-hand tributary of the Sesia which flows through the valley.

== Geography ==
The municipalities of the lowest part of the valley are Ailoche, Caprile, Coggiola, Crevacuore, Guardabosone, Pray and Portula. Its highest part is used as pasture and administratively is divided in several exclaves belonging to the municipalities of the central part of the Province of Biella.

== Notable summits ==
Among the notable summits which surround the valley (al belonging to the Biellese Alps) there are:

- Monte Bo - 2.556 m
- Testone delle Tre Alpi - 2.081 m
- Cima dell'Asnas - 2.039 m
- Monte Barone - 2.044 m
- Cima delle Guardie - 2.001 m

== Nature conservation ==
The highest part of the valley and some surrounding areas are included in a SIC (Site of Community Importance) of 10,786.73 ha called Val Sessera (code IT1130002).

== See also ==
- Biellese Alps
- Bocchetto Sessera
