= Bocchetto Sessera =

Bocchetto di Sessera
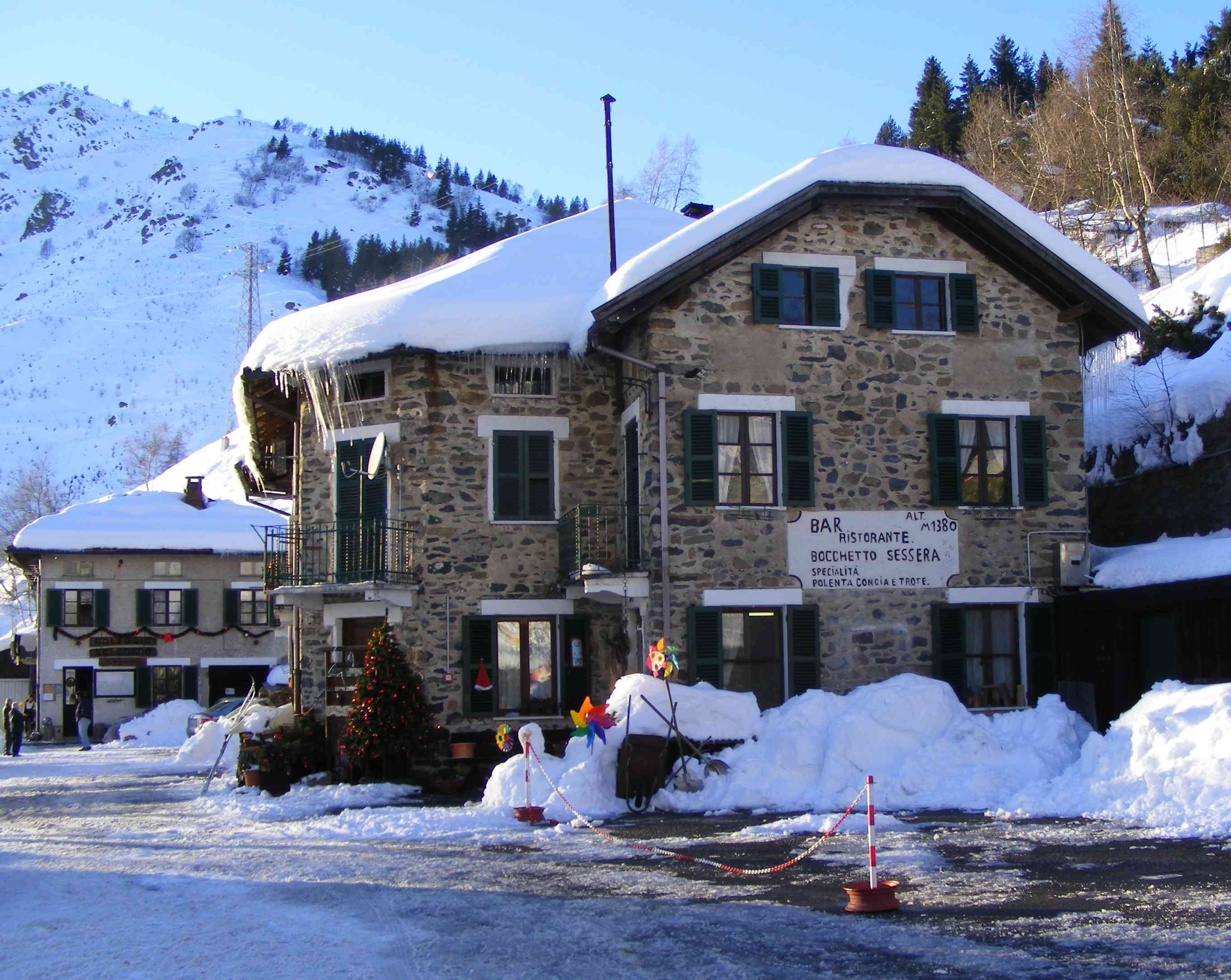
- The mountain inn near the pass

- Location within Alps
- Elevation: 1,373 metres (4,505 ft)
- Traversed by: asphalted road

Third Approach
- Location: Piedmont, Italy
- Range: Alpi Biellesi
- Coordinates: 45°39′51″N 08°03′46″E

Bocchetto Sessera or Bocchetto di Sessera is a mountain pass (el. 1,373 m) across the Alpi Biellesi. It connects Strona di Mosso Valley and Valsessera, both in the province of Biella (Piemonte, Italy) .

== Etymology ==
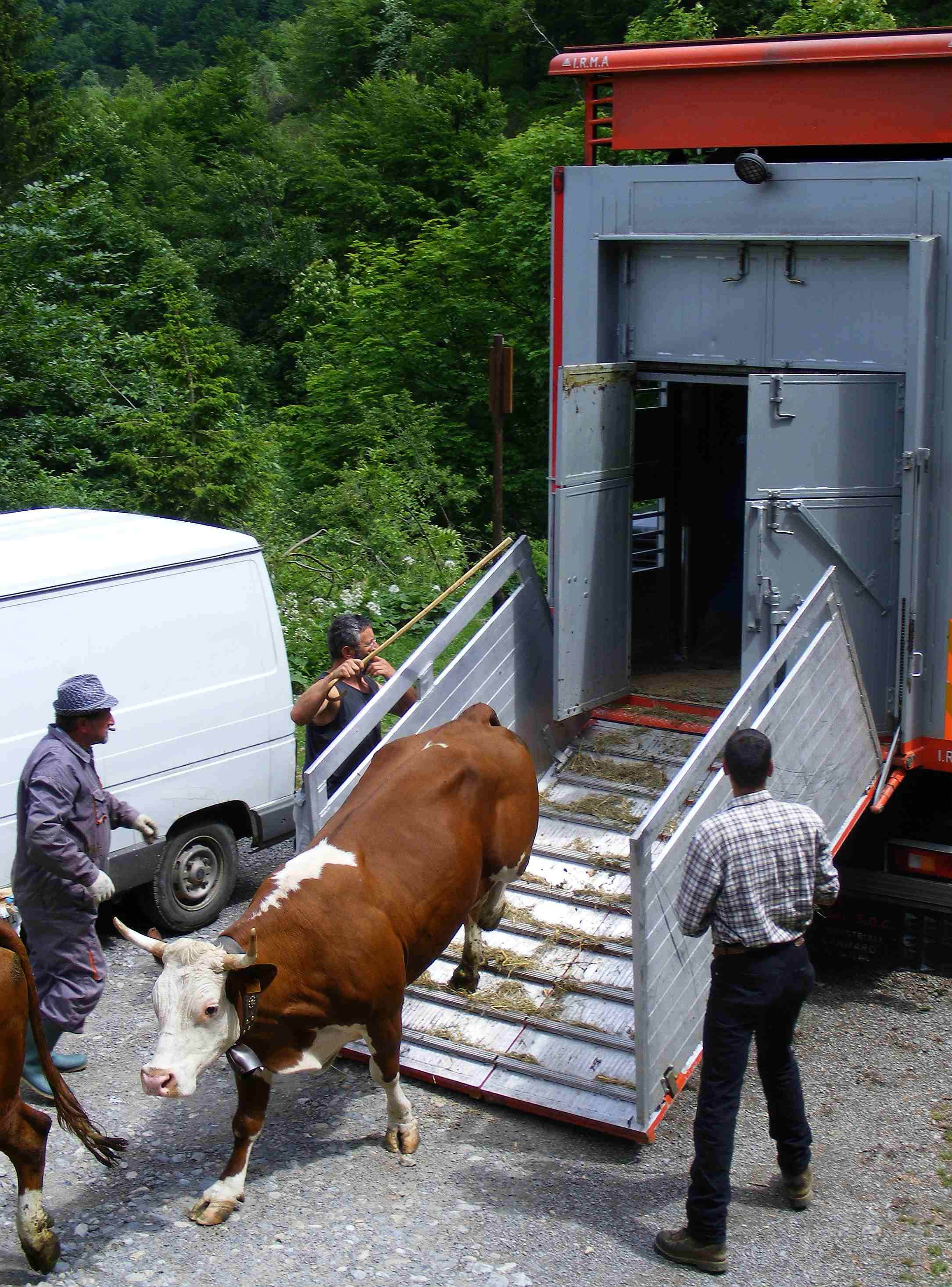
Bocchetto di Sessera is a transit point for the cattle transferred during the summer from the Biellese central part to the pasturage area of Valsessera

In the local dialect bochet means mountain pass, while Sessera is the name of the river which flows in the Sessera Valley.

== Geography ==
The pass is located between Monticchio (1,697 m, W) and monte Marca (1,558 m, E). It belongs to the water divide between the drainage basins of Cervo and Sessera.

== Access ==
Bocchetto di Sassera can be accessed by car from Campiglia Cervo or from Trivero by the former national road Strada statale 232 Panoramica Zegna. From the pass start some forestry roads which deserve the middle section of Sessera Valley. Some of these dirt roads by winter are used as cross-country skiing paths.

== Maps ==
- Italian official cartography (Istituto Geografico Militare - IGM); on-line version: www.pcn.minambiente.it
- Provincia di Biella cartography: Carta dei sentieri della Provincia di Biella, 1:25.00 scale, 2004; on line version: webgis.provincia.biella.it
