= Thom Browne =

American fashion designer (born 1965)

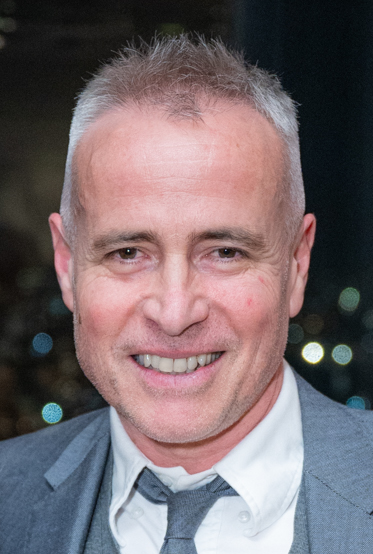
- Browne in October 2024
- Born: September 27, 1965 (age 61); Allentown, Pennsylvania, U.S.
- Education: University of Notre Dame
- Occupation: Fashion designer
- Label: Thom Browne
- Partner: Andrew Bolton
- Website: thombrowne.com

Thom Browne (born September 27, 1965) is an American fashion designer and the founder and head of design for Thom Browne, a luxury fashion brand based in New York City. Browne debuted his womenswear collection in 2014.

In 2023, Browne became the chairman of the Council of Fashion Designers of America, succeeding Tom Ford.

== Early life and education ==
Browne was born on September 27, 1965, in Allentown, Pennsylvania, into an Irish-Italian family. He attended Catholic school until seventh grade and served as an altar boy, and later attended and graduated from William Allen High School in Allentown.

He attended the University of Notre Dame, where he was a member of its men’s swimming and diving team and graduated with a degree in economics.

== Career ==
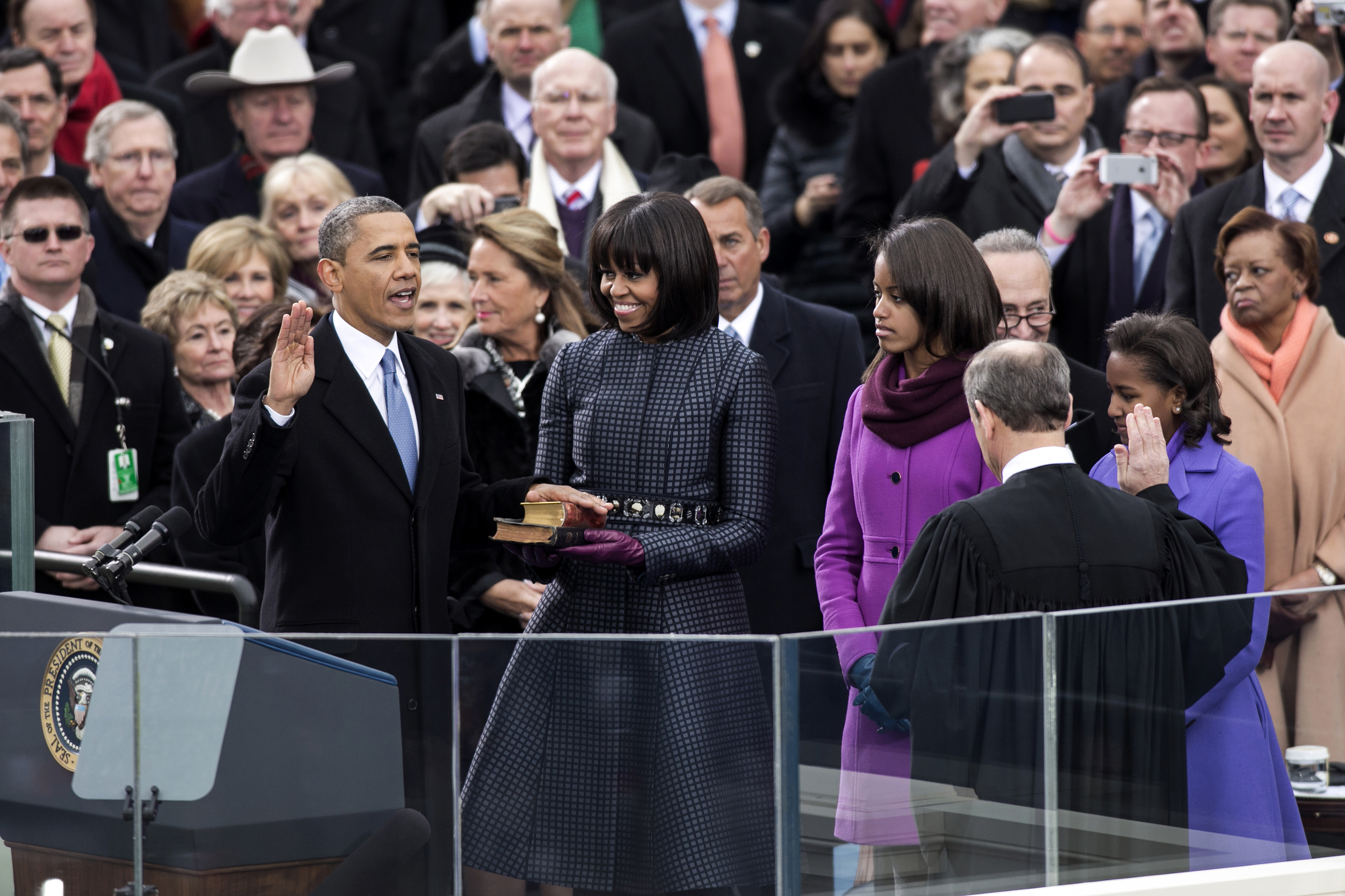
Michelle Obama (center) at Barack Obama's second inauguration, wearing a Browne silk jacquard coat and dress in a navy checked pattern based on "a men's necktie fabric"

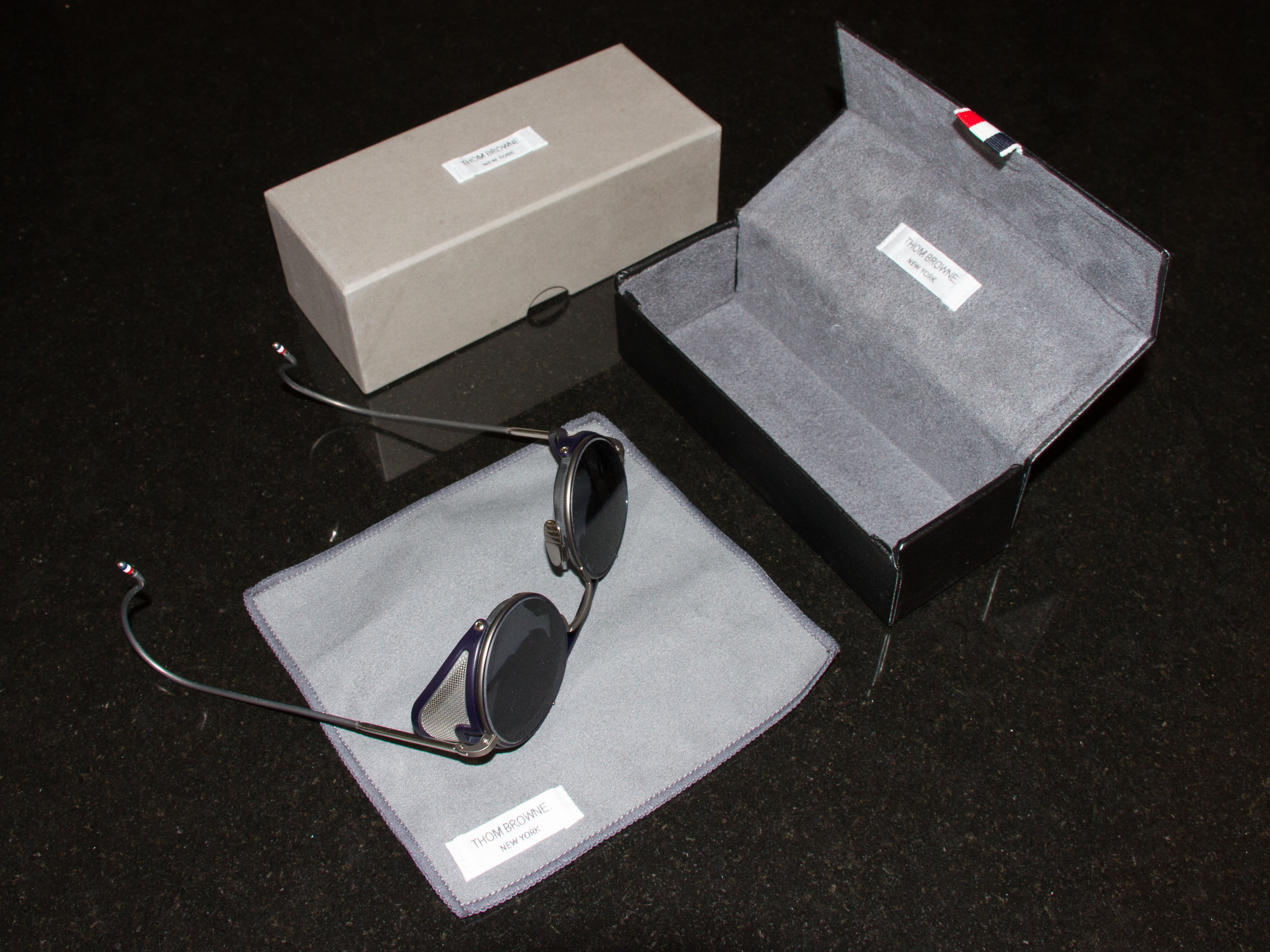
Thom Browne Sunglasses from his eyewear collection

Browne pursued an acting career in Los Angeles from 1992 to 1998. He added the "H" to his birth name Tom because his name was taken by someone else in the Screen Actors Guild. He also worked as a production assistant and script reader on films.

Browne started making custom suits after befriending Johnson Hartig, who went on to found the brand Libertine. He moved to New York City in 1997, where he began working as a salesman at Armani's wholesale showroom. Club Monaco, then a Polo Ralph Lauren brand, later selected him to lead its creative development team, where he worked with American fashion designer Ralph Lauren. Browne led Club Monaco's design department for several years before launching the Thom Browne label.

=== Thom Browne ===
Browne started his eponymous business with made-to-measure suits in 2001, with its first shop in New York's West Village.

Thom Browne's breakthrough is considered to be his reimagining of the suit, shrinking the proportions and cutting the fit closer to the body, encapsulated by his signature grey suit. His preferred fabric is Super 120's wool twill in "medium gray". Every Thom Browne piece includes a red-white-and-blue striped grosgrain ribbon.

Between 2001 and 2015, Browne produced his suits and runway looks with Rocco Ciccarelli. He introduced a limited ready-to-wear collection in 2003. In 2005, the brand held its first menswear runway show in New York City.

In a move designed to appeal to younger customers, Thom Browne launched a men's capsule collection for fall 2012 called Thom Grey that was offered at a lower price than his signature line. Thom Grey was a one-year-only project and was subsequently discontinued.

The brand's first external investor, Japan's Stripe International (formerly Cross), gave the company the capital it needed to recover from the 2008 financial crisis, before selling its stake on to Sandbridge Capital – a private equity firm whose advisors included Tommy Hilfiger, Domenico De Sole and Dominique de Villepin – in 2016. At that time, the business was believed to have annual sales of more than $60 million.

Since 2010, Thom Browne has primarily shown his men's collections in Paris. After selling a women's wear capsule collection at Barneys New York for a couple of seasons in 2007 and 2008, the brand launched its women's wear line in 2011; by 2021, it comprised nearly half the company's revenue.

In August 2018, Zegna purchased 85 percent of the brand for $500 million, which was seen as a bid by the century-old Italian company to court a younger demographic and reach new markets. Zegna increased its stake to 90 percent in 2021 and to 92 percent in 2024. Browne retains the remaining 8 percent and continues as the brand's chief creative officer.

In 2023, Thom Browne debuted its first couture collection at Paris Fashion Week.

In 2025, Rodrigo Bazan stepped down as chief executive officer and was succeeded by Sam Lobban.

Browne has produced four films that accompanied his collections, including the spring 2007 short "The Septemberists" (in collaboration with Anthony Goicolea); a 10-minute black-and-white film starring skier Lindsey Vonn for his fall 2021 women's collection; and the 29-minute "Looking Forward to Tomorrow" depicting the loneliness of marathon training for his spring 2022 men's collection.

==== Other products ====
In June 2011, Thom Browne launched its first eyewear collection with Dita Eyewear. The brand brought its sunglasses business in-house in 2022.

Also since 2011, the brand has been designing swimwear.

The brand's childrenwear range was launched in 2021. The childrenswear line was initially also licensed, but the company internalized that division, too.

==== Collaborations ====
In September 2006, Brooks Brothers announced its partnership with Browne as part of a guest designer program to create and distribute a 50-piece men's and women's high-end collection, Black Fleece by Brooks Brothers. Claudio Del Vecchio, chairman and chief executive officer of Brooks Brothers, said "Thom Browne's brilliant eye... his ability to foreshadow the market and offer a special look will bring a new dimension to Brooks Brothers."

The line appeared exclusively in 30 Brooks Brothers stores worldwide beginning in September 2007. In July 2008, Thom Browne and Brooks Brothers announced they would continue their partnership in the Black Fleece collection for another three years. Brooks Brothers opened a standalone Black Fleece store located in New York City's West Village.

In 2008, Browne teamed up with the Italian sportswear company and down apparel specialist Moncler to design their men's top line Moncler Gamme Bleu, which was shown at Milan Fashion Week.

In September 2020, Browne made a scarf as part of Joe Biden's "Believe in Better" fashion collection, which included collaborations from 18 other fashion designers around the country as part of the Biden's 2020 presidential campaign.

==== Style and themes ====
Browne's style and themes revolve around blending traditional menswear with avant-garde elements. His designs are both classic and subversive, rooted in the gray suit but transformed into fashion statements through unconventional cuts, proportions, and androgynous detailing. Browne frequently explores the concept of the "uniform", with his collections adhering to a strict aesthetic code while allowing for personal expression within the structure. He creates a cohesive identity across his brand but emphasizing the duality of uniformity.

==== Marketing ====
Thom Browne has dressed teams including the Cleveland Cavaliers and FC Barcelona. In 2018, LeBron James led the entire Cleveland Cavaliers team during the NBA playoffs in coordinated gray Thom Browne suits.

== Awards and honors ==
- GQ Designer of the Year, 2008
- Cooper Hewitt National Design Award, 2012
- CFDA Menswear Designer of the Year Award, 2006, 2013, and 2016
- Pratt Institute Pratt Fashion Visionary Award, 2013
- Fashion Institute of Technology (FIT) Couture Council Award for Artistry of Fashion, 2017
- 100 most influential people in the world by Time, 2023

== Legal issues ==
Thom Browne long used a three-bar design on its clothing, only changing it to the four-stripe design after Adidas objected in 2007. Adidas sued Thom Browne's brand in 2021, claiming that the four-bar and "Grosgrain" stripe patterns on shoes and high-end activewear violated its three-stripe trademark rights. A jury determined in 2023 that the Thom Browne designs were not likely to cause customer confusion with Adidas' products and did not violate the company's trademark rights.

== Personal life ==
Browne lives with his partner Andrew Bolton, who is curator at the Costume Institute of the Metropolitan Museum of Art in Manhattan. His older brother, Pat Browne, is a former member of the Pennsylvania State Senate and Secretary of the Pennsylvania Department of Revenue.

In 2019, Browne and Bolton purchased and renovated a 7,000-square-foot, 15-room Sutton Place mansion formerly owned by the philanthropist Drue Heinz.
