= Scenography =

Theatre design including lighting, sound, set, and costume design

Scenography is the practice of crafting stage environments or atmospheres. In the contemporary English usage, scenography can be defined as the combination of technological and material stagecrafts to represent, enact, and produce a sense of place in performance.

While inclusive of the techniques of scenic design and set design, scenography is a holistic approach to the study and practice of all aspects of design in performance. It also includes the design of lighting, sound, and costumes.

== Etymology and cultural interpretations ==
The term scenography is of Greek origin (skēnē, meaning 'stage or scene building'; grapho, meaning 'to describe') originally detailed within Aristotle's Poetics as 'skenographia'. Nevertheless, within continental Europe, the term has been closely aligned with the professional practice of scénographie and is synonymous with the English-language term 'theatre design'. More recently, the term has been used in museography with regard to the curation of museum exhibits.

== History ==
In what is not the first use of the term, Antonio Caimi, in 1862, describes a category of artists practising pittura scenica e l'architettura teatrale, inspired by the artist Ferdinando Galli-Bibiena, who was also known as a painter of quadratura, or architectural painting (usually trompe-l'œil depictions of architecture on ceilings or walls). Caimi also calls this Arte scenografica, and notes that it required ingenious engineering to create movable sets, or create illusions of environments. The Galli da Bibiena family was a pedigree of scenographic artistry that emerged in late-seventeenth-century Bologna, but spread throughout northern Italy to Austria and Germany. Another large family known for theatrical scenography were members of the Quaglio surname.

Caimi goes on to mention practitioners of scenography in the second half of the 18th century and early 19th century in Lombardy, including: Bernardino Galliari, Gaspare Galliari, Pasquale Canna, Pietro Gonzaga, Paolo Landriani, Giovanni Perego, Alessandro Sanquirico, Bomenico Menozzi, Carlo Fontana, Baldassare Cavallotti, Carlo Ferrari, Filippo Peroni, Carlo Ferrario, Enrico Rovecchi, Angelo Moja, Luigi Vimercati, and the brothers Mofta of Modena, among others. A review of the history of Italian-influenced scenic painting, architecture, and design up to the nineteenth century, was provided by Landriani.

== Usage ==
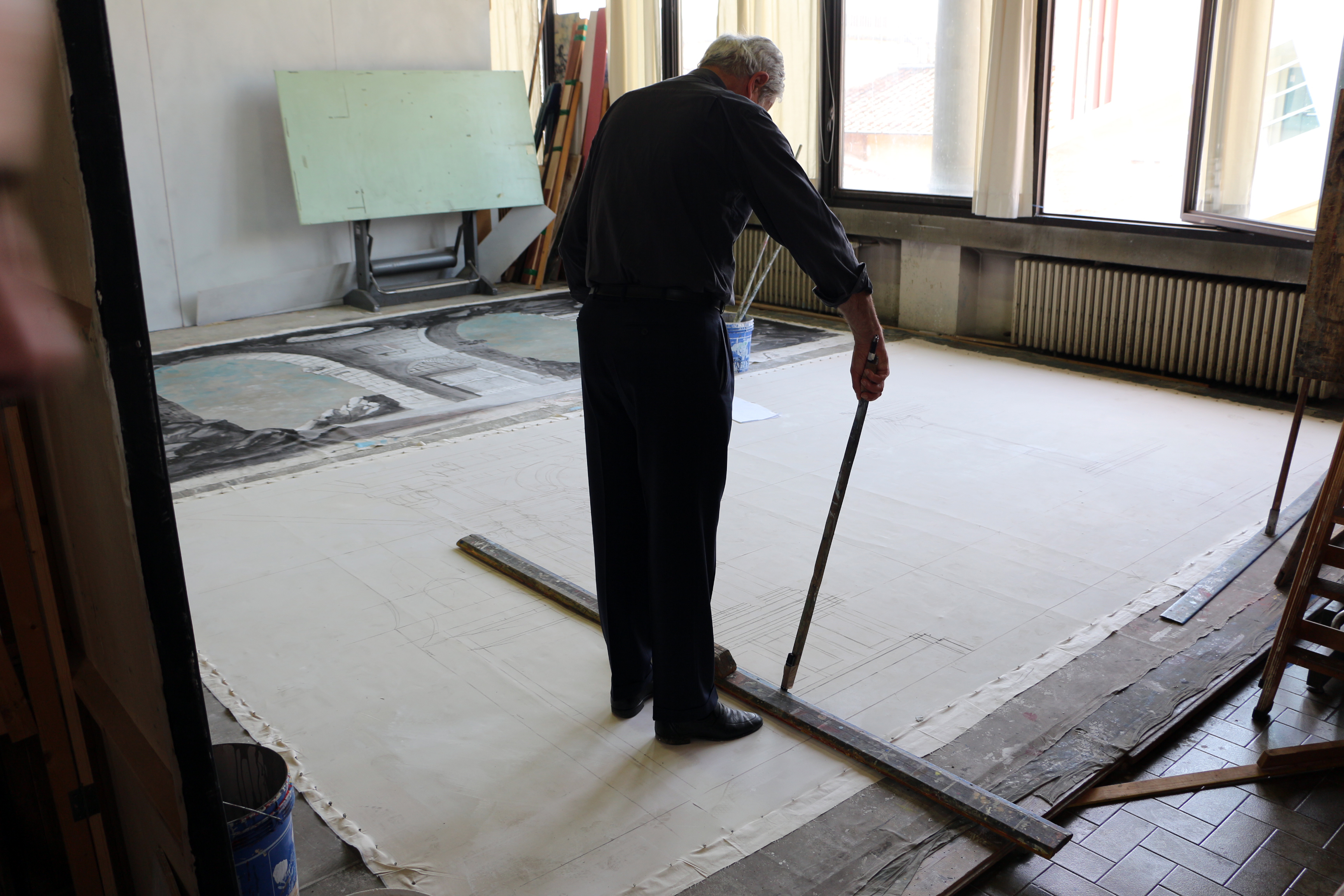
Designing a set with traditional techniques

While also aligned with the professional practice of the scenographer, it is important to distinguish the individual elements that comprise the 'design' of a performance event (such as light, environment, costume, etc.) from the term 'scenography', which is an artistic perspective concerning the visual, experiential, and spatial composition of performance. Influenced by the work of Modernist pioneers Adolphe Appia and Edward Gordon Craig, scenography proposes that design practices within performance are considered an equal partner, alongside other elements such as literary texts and performance technique, within the construction and reception of meaning. The practice of scenography is thereby a holistic approach to the composition of performance and can be applied to the design or curation of events within, and outside of, the conventional theatre environment. Or, as Pamela Howard states in her book What is Scenography?:

"Scenography is the seamless synthesis of space, text, research, art, actors, directors and spectators that contributes to an original creation."

Joslin McKinney and Philip Butterworth expand upon this to suggest that:

"Scenography is not simply concerned with creating and presenting images to an audience; it is concerned with audience reception and engagement. It is a sensory as well as an intellectual experience, emotional as well as rational."

== Scenographic theory ==
While there is no one theory of scenography, Rachel Hann has argued for a distinction between 'scenography' and 'scenographics'. Hann introduces this framework by plotting the usage of key terminologies:

"As part of this differentiation, I approach a scenographic trait as orientating and scenography as a crafting. My intention is to map how these evidently related concepts apply to artistic and social scenarios beyond institutional conceptions of theatre. I attempt to dissuade the reader from understanding notions of scenographic as singular and monolithic. My adoption of scenographics stresses the inherent plurality and multiplicities that sustain a scenographic encounter. Consequently, scenographic traits result from a combination of orientating stimuli that exceed strict ontologies of empiricism and complicate the neat separation of theatrical crafts."

Scenographics are a collection of place-orienting traits that are often explicit in theatre, yet are also present within other scenographic cultures such as gardening and visual merchandising. These traits draw attention to "orders of world" by employing methods that sculpt or irritate how distinct worlding orientations (whether that of materiality and texture, familiarity and proximity, as well as ideologies of nation and identity) sit together as part of a broader geography. Hann consolidates this position by arguing that to "speak of staging is to speak of how scenographics enact an 'othering' of place". Scenographics are "interventional acts of orientation that complicate, reveal or score processes of worlding".

This approach positions scenography as a "crafting of place orientation" and a theatre-making strategy, alongside dramaturgy and choreography. The usage of place orientation as the loci for scenography seeks to capture an understanding that is inclusive of the physical as well as metaphysical relations that affect how individuals design and experience the assemblage of place. This could be the role of directed sound systems in cultivating a feeling of isolation; the usage of a tightly focused lantern to re-orientate the spatial dimensions of a place; the scent of an old well-worn desk; along with how costumes mould relations between bodies and stage environments. In practice, Hann argues that it is the interrelations between these distinct methods of scenography (costume, scenery, light, sound) that give rise to an act of scenography, where "scenography is neither exclusively visual nor spatial"

Lastly, Hann proposes that scenographics are formative to all staged atmospheres by arguing that there "are no stages without scenographics". This is based on the argument that "all stages are also scenes" that challenges the "deterministic assumption that stages precede scenography". In this model, stages become manifest through the place-orienting traits of scenographics (rather than the other way around). The implications of this are that all theatre is scenographic—even if it has no defined objects or 'setting'—as all theatre is performed on a stage. Hann summarises this position by using the hybrid 'stage-scene' when discussing the tensions between the histories of these practices, particularly with reference to original Greek skene as a physical tent or hut that ultimately shaped current conceptualizations of 'the stage'.

== See also ==
- Theatrical scenery
- Video design
- Prague Quadrennial

== Selected bibliography ==
- Aronson, A. (2005) Looking into the Abyss: Essays on Scenography, Ann Arbor: University of Michigan Press
- Aronson, A. (2018) The History and Theory of Environmental Scenography, (Revised 2nd edition) London: Bloomsbury Methuen
- Aronson, A.(2018) The Routledge Companion to Scenography, London: Routledge
- Baugh, C. (2013) Theatre, Performance, and Technology: The Development and Transformation of Scenography, (Revised 2nd edition) Basingstoke: Palgrave Macmillan
- Beacham, R. C. (1994) Adolphe Appia: Artist and Visionary of the Modern Theatre, Reading: Harwood Academic Publishers
- Brockett, O. G., Mitchell, M. and Hardberger, L. (2010) Making the Scene: A History of Stage Design and Technology in Europe and the United States, Austin (TX): University of Texas Press
- Craig, E. G. (1911) Towards a New Theatre, London: Heinemann. [Reprinted in 1962, London: Mercury Books]
- Hann, R. (2019) Beyond Scenography, Oxon. and New York: Routledge
- Hannah, D. and Harsløf, O. eds. (2008) Performance Design, Nijalsgade, Denmark: Museum Tusculanum Press
- Howard, P. (2002) What is Scenography?, London: Routledge [Second Edition 2009]
- McAuley, G. (1999) Space in Performance: Making Meaning in the Theatre, Ann Arbor: University of Michigan Press
- McKinney, J. and Butterworth, P. (2009) The Cambridge Introduction to Scenography, Cambridge: Cambridge University Press
- McKinney, J. and Palmer, S. (2017) Scenography Expanded: An Introduction to Contemporary Performance Design, London: Bloomsbury Methuen
- Svoboda, J. and Burian, J. ed. (1993) The Secret of Theatrical Space, New York: Applause Theatre Books

=== Journals ===
- Scene, published by Intellect since 2012
- Theatre and Performance Design, published by Routledge since 2015
