= Galliari =

Galliari is a surname. Notable people with the surname include:

- Bernardino Galliari (1707–1794), Italian painter
- Fabrizio Galliari (1709–1790), Italian painter and stage designer
- Gaspare Galliari (1760–1818), Italian painter
