= Alessandro Sanquirico =

Italian scenic designer, architect, and painter

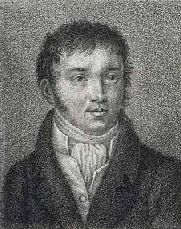
Alessandro Sanquirico

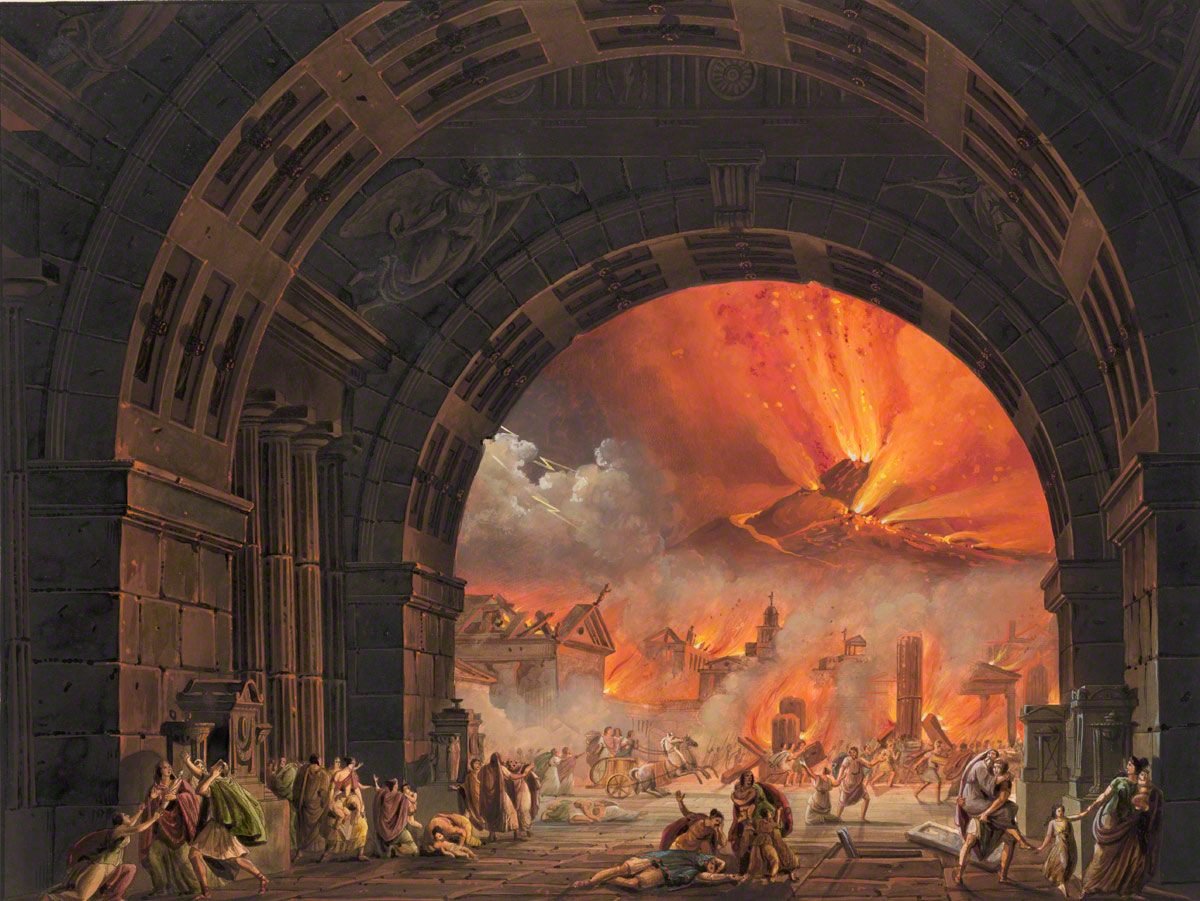
Sanquirico's set design for the eruption of Mount Vesuvius in Giovanni Pacini's opera L'ultimo giorno di Pompei, 1827 La Scala production

Alessandro Sanquirico (27 July 1777 – 12 March 1849, in Milan) was an Italian scenic designer, architect, and painter. He began his career in conjunction with leading artists of the time such as Paolo Landriani, Giovanni Pedroni, Giovanni Perego, and Georgio Fuentes. Additionally, he studied architecture and perspective with Giuseppe Piermarini, the architect of the La Scala opera house.

Altogether, he designed over 300 productions for that house, including many premières. Specifically, they included four operas by Vincenzo Bellini.

== Biography ==
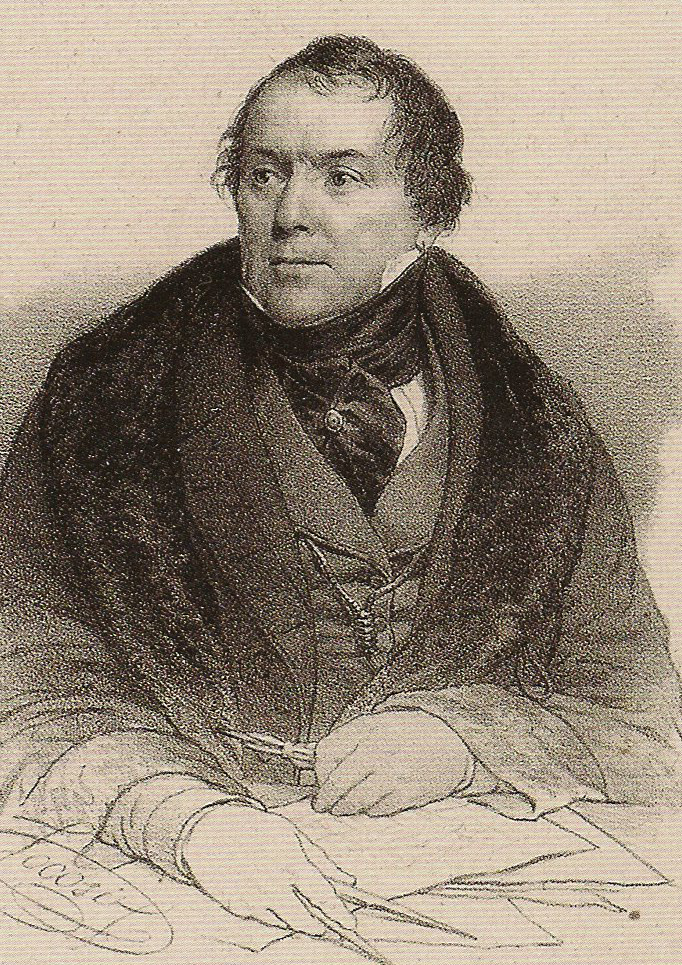
Alessando Sanquirico (Litho Roberto Focosi, 1822)

Alessandro Sanquirico was born on 27 July 1777. He was born in the family home located above the Caffè Sanquirico in Milan which his father, Ambrogio Sanquirico, managed. He was trained at the Brera Academy where his teachers included Giuseppe Piermarini (architecture), Leopoldo Pollack (elements of architecture), Giuliano Traballesi (painting), Giuseppe Franchi (sculpture), and Martino Knoller (color).

For fifteen years, from 1817 to 1832, Sanquirico was the sole designer and chief scene painter for La Scala. He dominated the visual style of La Scala, not only on stage, but also in the auditorium; notably designing both a new chandelier and a new curtain in the years 1821 to 1823 followed by adding many new designs to the interior of the theatre during a massive renovation of La Scala in 1830 that was done in collaboration with Francesco Hayez. He designed the ballets of Salvatore Viganò at the beginning of the 19th century, and the world premières of Rossini's La gazza ladra, Bellini's Il pirata, La straniera, La sonnambula as well as Norma in 1831. His set designs were prepared for Donizetti's works at La Scala, and these included Anna Bolena when it appeared there, Ugo, conte di Parigi and L'elisir d'amore, both in 1832, and the premiere of Lucrezia Borgia in 1833.

In 1832 Sanquirico was dismissed from his position at La Scala by its new leader, Teodoro Gottardi, and was replaced by a trio of artists, Domenico Menozzi, Baldassarre Cavallotti and Carlo Ferrari; none of whom rose to the quality of Sanquirico's work. An appeal from Franz von Hartig, then governor over Lombardy, led to his recall as a "consultant" to La Scala in 1833. He remained in that role during Hartig's tenure. When Hartig was succeeded as governor by Johann Baptist Spaur, Spaur appointed Sanquirico general consultant to La Scala in 1843, maintaining his involvement as a consulting designer at the theater into the last years of his life.

In addition to his work for the theater, Sanquirico was also regularly called upon to design works for public events and parties in Milan. He provided the decorations for the celebration of the crowning of Ferdinand I of Austria, as king of Lombardy and the Veneto. Additionally, he worked in the Teatro Alberti in Desenzano, the Teatro Sociale in Canzo, the Teatro Sociale in Como, and the Teatro Municipale in Piacenza. He worked with Andrea Appiani and Bargigli in the design of the Arena Civica of Milan and provided the scenography for ballets by Salvatore Viganò. He helped decorate ceilings in the Cathedral of Milan.

Sanquirico died in Milan on 12 March 1849.

== Assessment ==
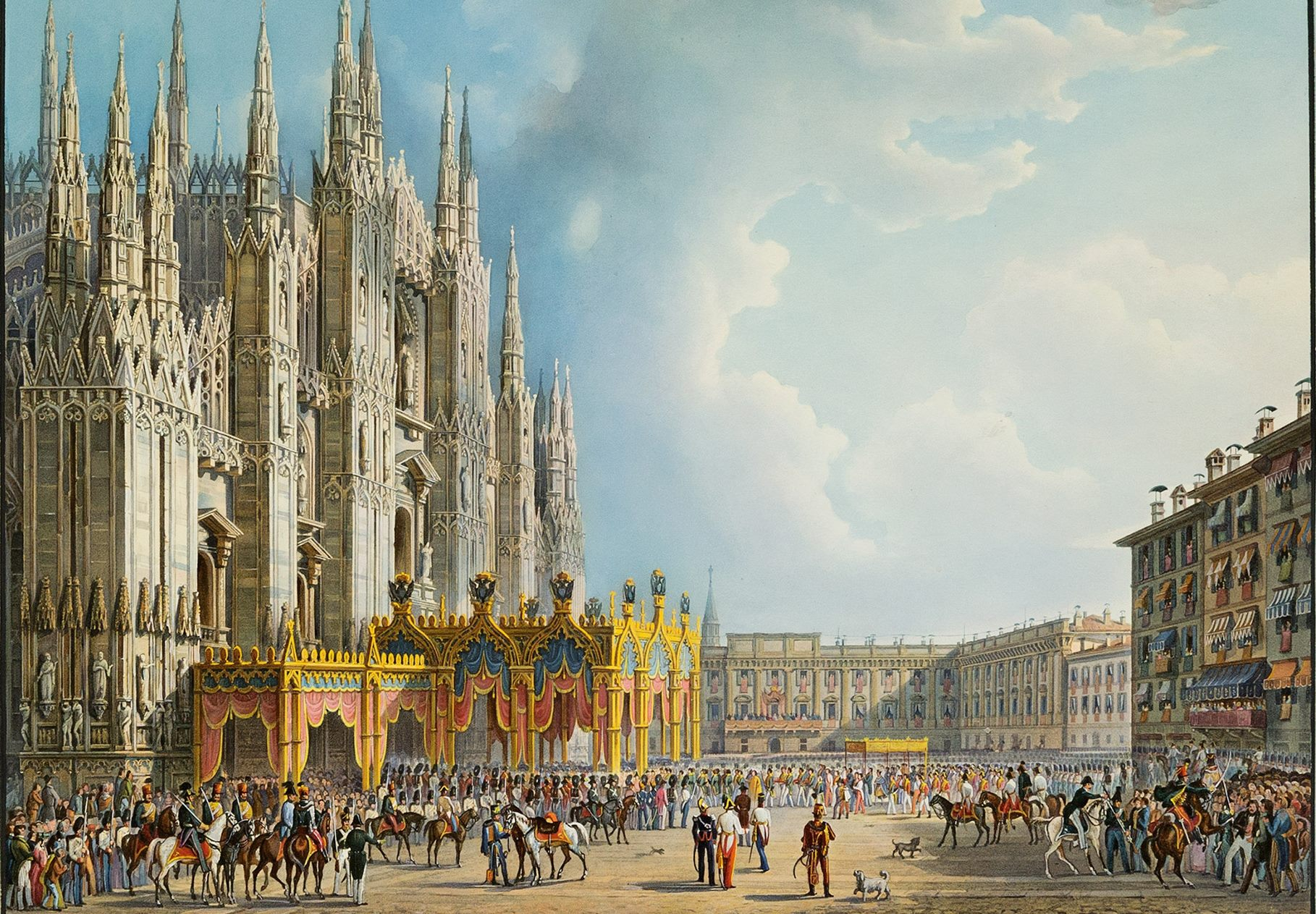
Sanquirico's design for the crowning of Ferdinand I of Austria at the Duomo, Milan

In describing the scale of Sanquirico's work, Daniel Snowman discusses some its features in relation to the growing Romantic style of Italian opera from the 1820s forward:

Stage designs took on new life as imaginative artists such as Sanquirico in Milan and Pierre-Luc-Charles Ciceri in Paris strove to re-create visually the spirit and scale of the Romantic dramas their designs would showcase. Sets would typically reveal a rich embellished foreground featuring evocative architecture of an earlier age, opening out onto a distant landscape bordered by a moving diorama instead of a static backcloth.

Paul Sheren further adds that the formula noted by Snowman "satisfied the aesthetic needs of romantic audiences for spectacle". Sheren concludes by noting that "one reason for Saquirico's international influence was the portfolios of hand-coloured engravings based on his theatrical and architectural drawings were published and extensively circulated and copied." An example of one of the Raccolta di varie decorazioni volumes is included in the "Sources" below. They were published by Ricordi in Milan from 1818 onward.

Another noted aspect of his work was that stage lighting, initially oil and Argand lamps, worked well with "his balance of contrasts and colours", but they helped create the "moods suggested in the librettos of many operas [including] overwhelming panic at the impending destruction of Pompei in Pacini's L'ultimo giorno di Pompei for Naples in 1825" and for La Scala in 1826. Additionally, in regard to lighting, by the end of his career (he retired in 1832), Sanquirico adapted to the introduction of gas lighting with the result that "his painted scenery showed a sensitivity to the nuances of light".

On a broader scale on the advancement of operatic styles, Baker suggests that the spectacular set for L'ultimo giorno "played a significant role in the establishment of grand opera in Paris."

== Bibliography ==
- Olivero, Gabriella (2015). "The "New" Bablylon by Alessandro Sanquirico". Music in Art: International Journal for Music Iconography. 40 (1–2): 125–138. ISSN 1522-7464.
- Viale Ferrero, Mercedes (2015). "L'Ultimo giorno di Pompei nell'immaginazione di Alessandro Sanquirico (ovvero: Come ricostruire una città per poterla distruggere)". Music in Art: International Journal for Music Iconography. 40 (1–2): 79–97. ISSN 1522-7464.
