= Fabrizio Galliari =

Italian painter

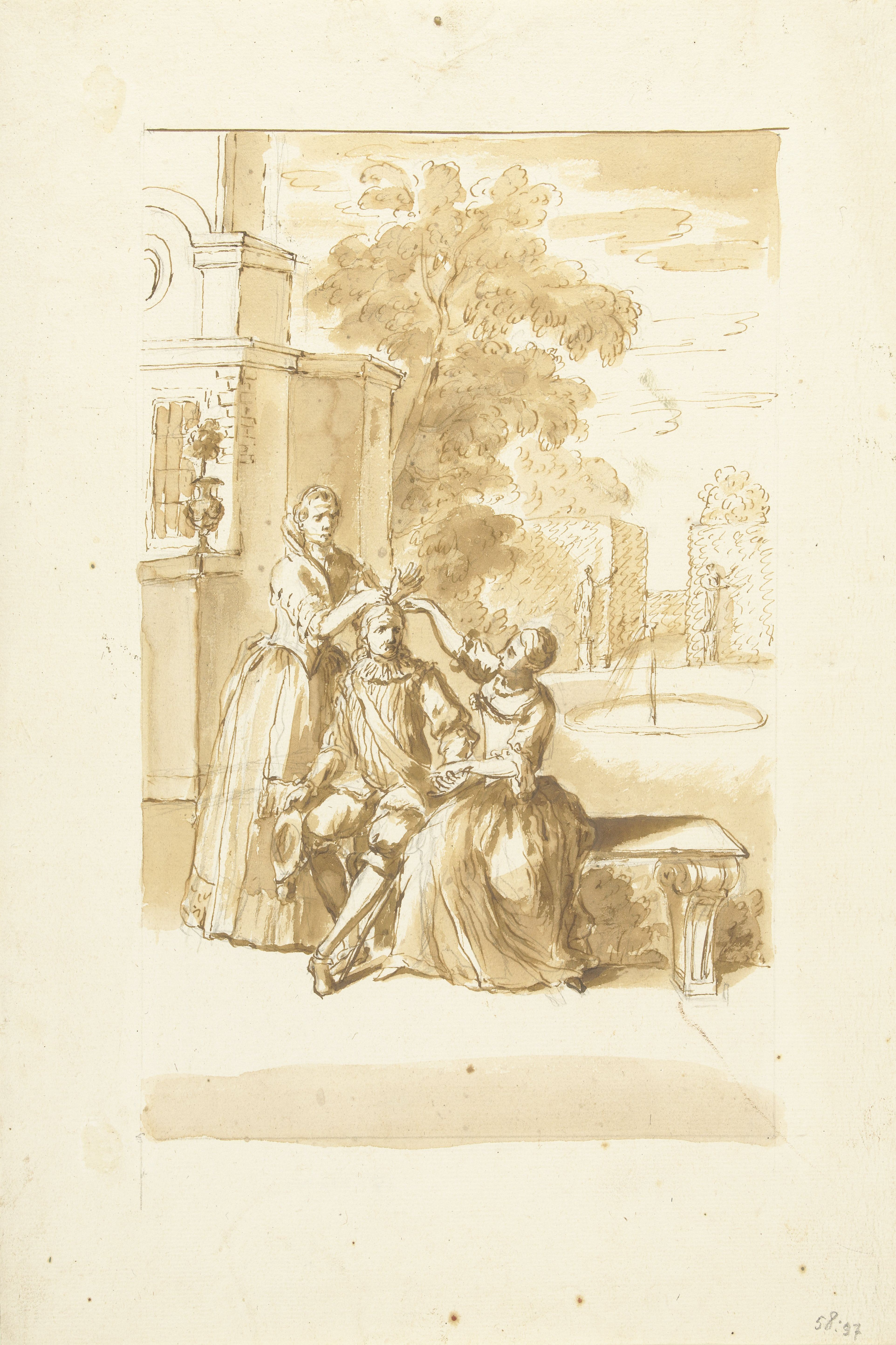
- Coronation of the Poet, Amsterdam, Rijksmuseum
- Born: 28 September 1709; Andorno Micca, Kingdom of Sardinia
- Died: 11 July 1790 (aged 80); Treviglio, Duchy of Milan, Austrian Empire
- Known for: Painting, scenic design
- Movement: Neoclassicism

Fabrizio Galliari (28 September 1709 – 11 July 1790) was a Neoclassical painter and stage designer active in Northern Italy.

== Biography ==
Fabrizio Galliari was born in Andorno in the Piedmontese province of Biella, and died in Treviglio. He was part of a large family of artists, the second son of Giovanni, and brother of Bernardino Galliari. He followed Bernardino to Milan, where he studied stage design. His career often coincided with that of his brother and it is often difficult to distinguish between their work, although Fabrizio concentrated on architecture. He worked for various local ecclesiastical and aristocratic patrons, besides designing theatrical sets.

In 1735 Bernardino and Fabrizio decorated the castle of the Visconti family at Brignano Gera d'Adda with trompe l’oeil architecture and landscape. The two brothers also frescoed the ballrooms of Villa Crivelli, Castellazzo (Milan), and of Villa Bettoni, Bugliaco, Lake Garda.

In 1738 Fabrizio painted a triumphal arch to celebrate the arrival in Venice of Maria Amalia of Saxony, on her way to be married to Prince Charles of Sicily (the future Charles III of Spain). The decorations at the castle of Les Marches in Savoy are mostly his work, as was the trompe-l'œil dome of Vercelli Cathedral (c. 1750). Three stage designs painted by Fabrizio (Vercelli, Museo Francesco Borgogna) unusually show their subject in side view rather than the frontal view more typical of Neoclassical taste.

In 1778, Galliari became professor at the Albertina Academy. He died in Treviglio on 11 July 1790. Among his pupils was Pietro Gonzaga.

== Gallery ==
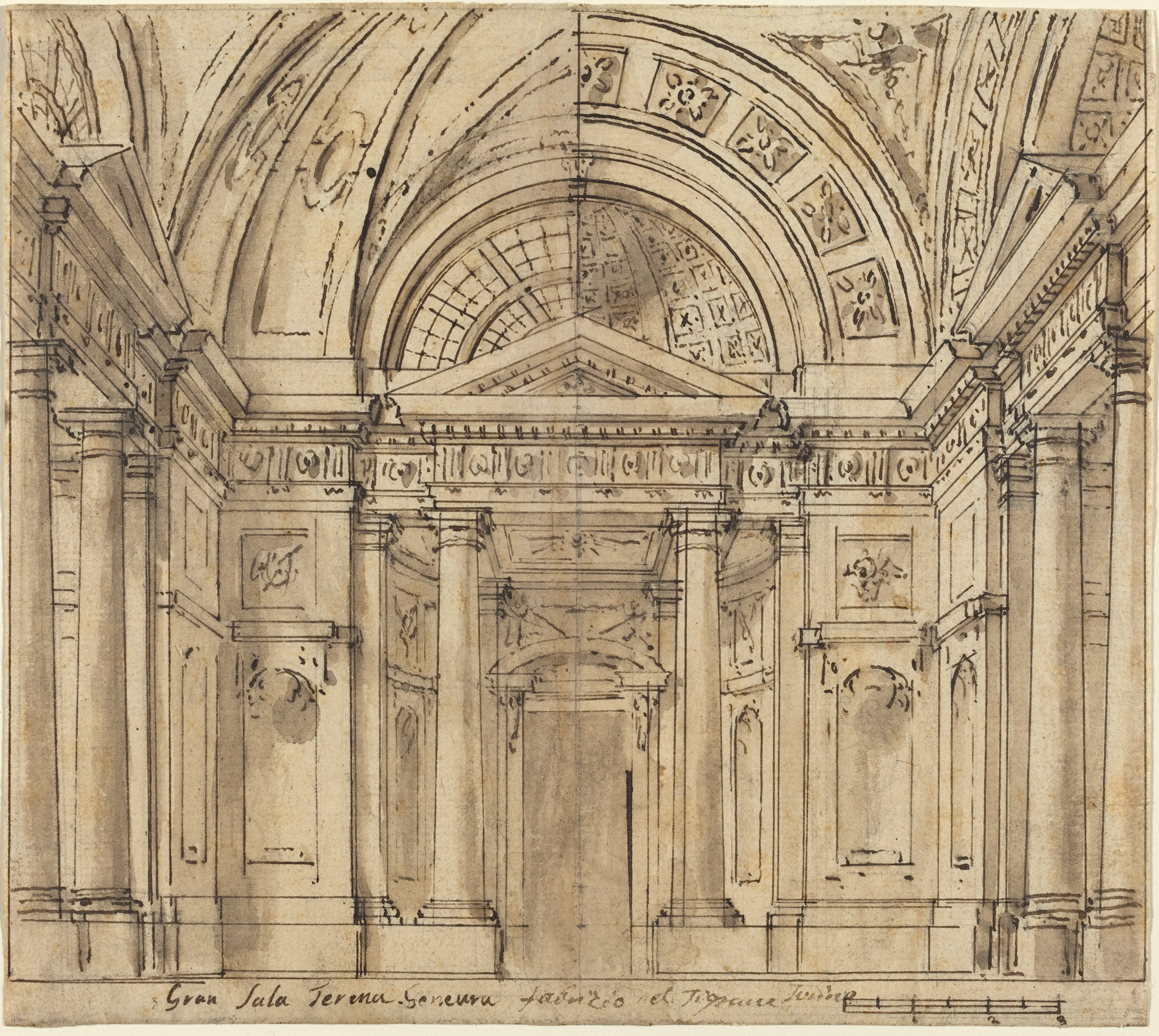
Design for Entrance to a Hall, Washington D.C., National Gallery of Art

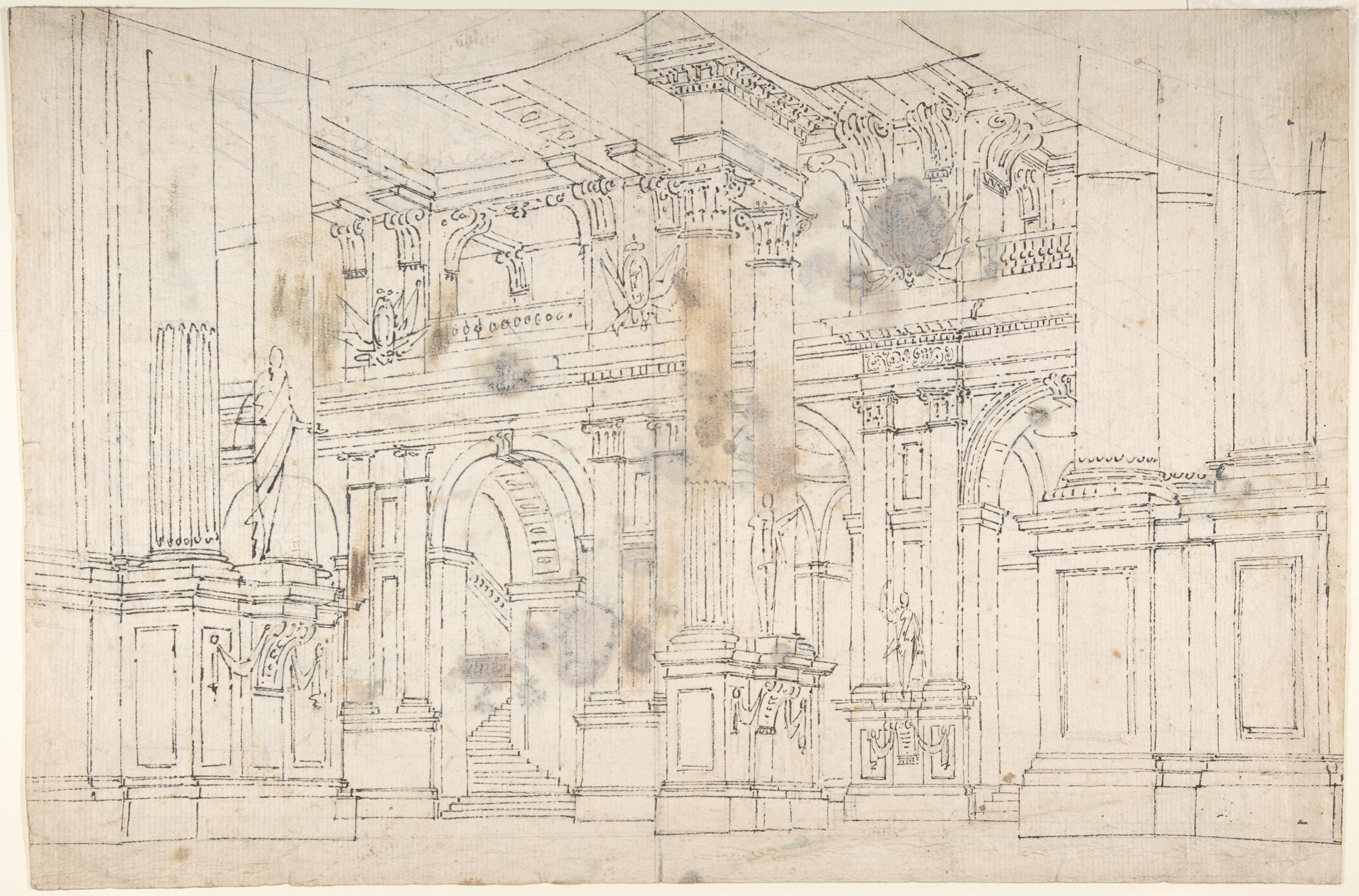
Stage Set Design for a Performance of "Iphigenia", New York, Metropolitan Museum of Art

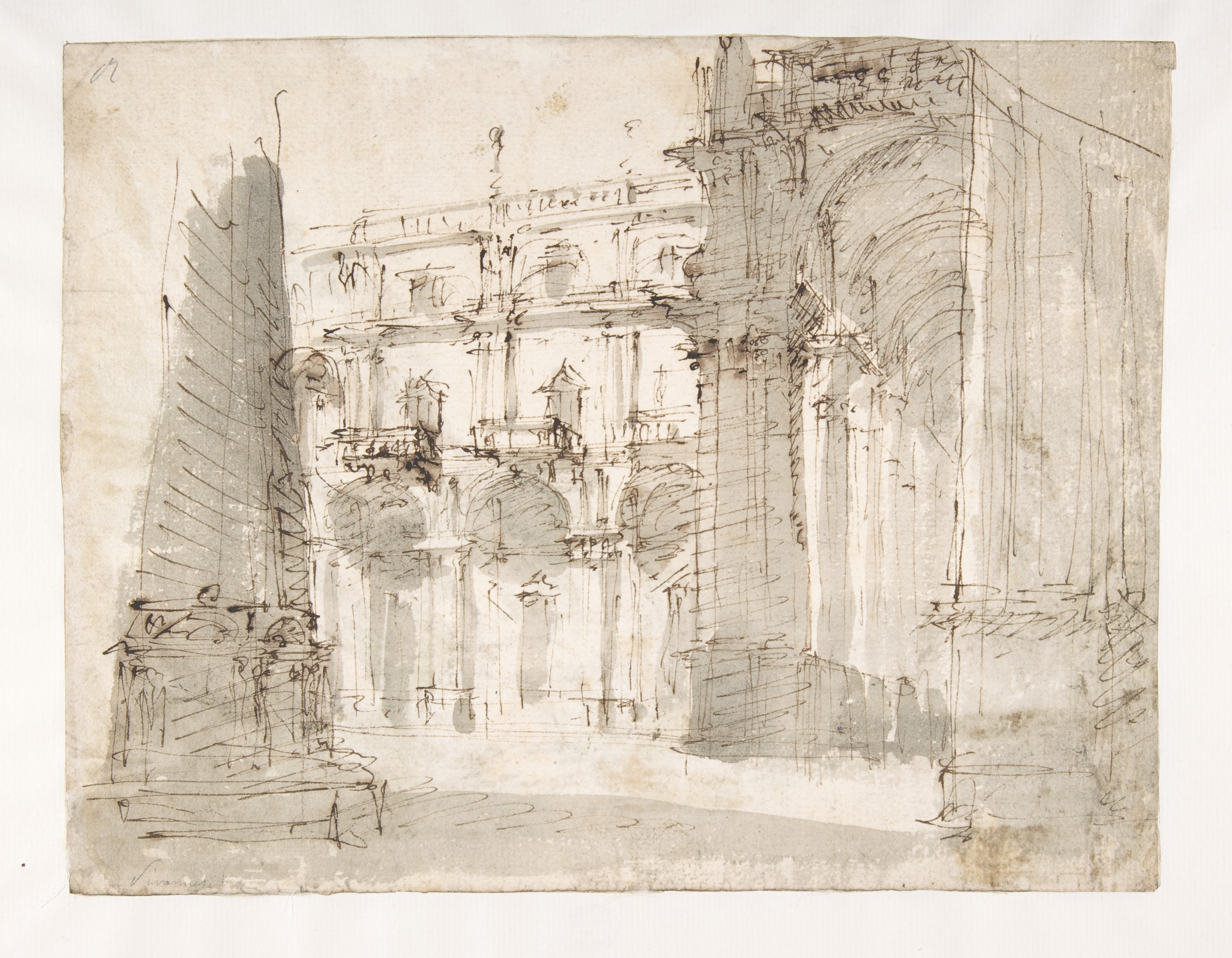
Street Scene with a Palace Facade and an Arcade, New York, Metropolitan Museum of Art

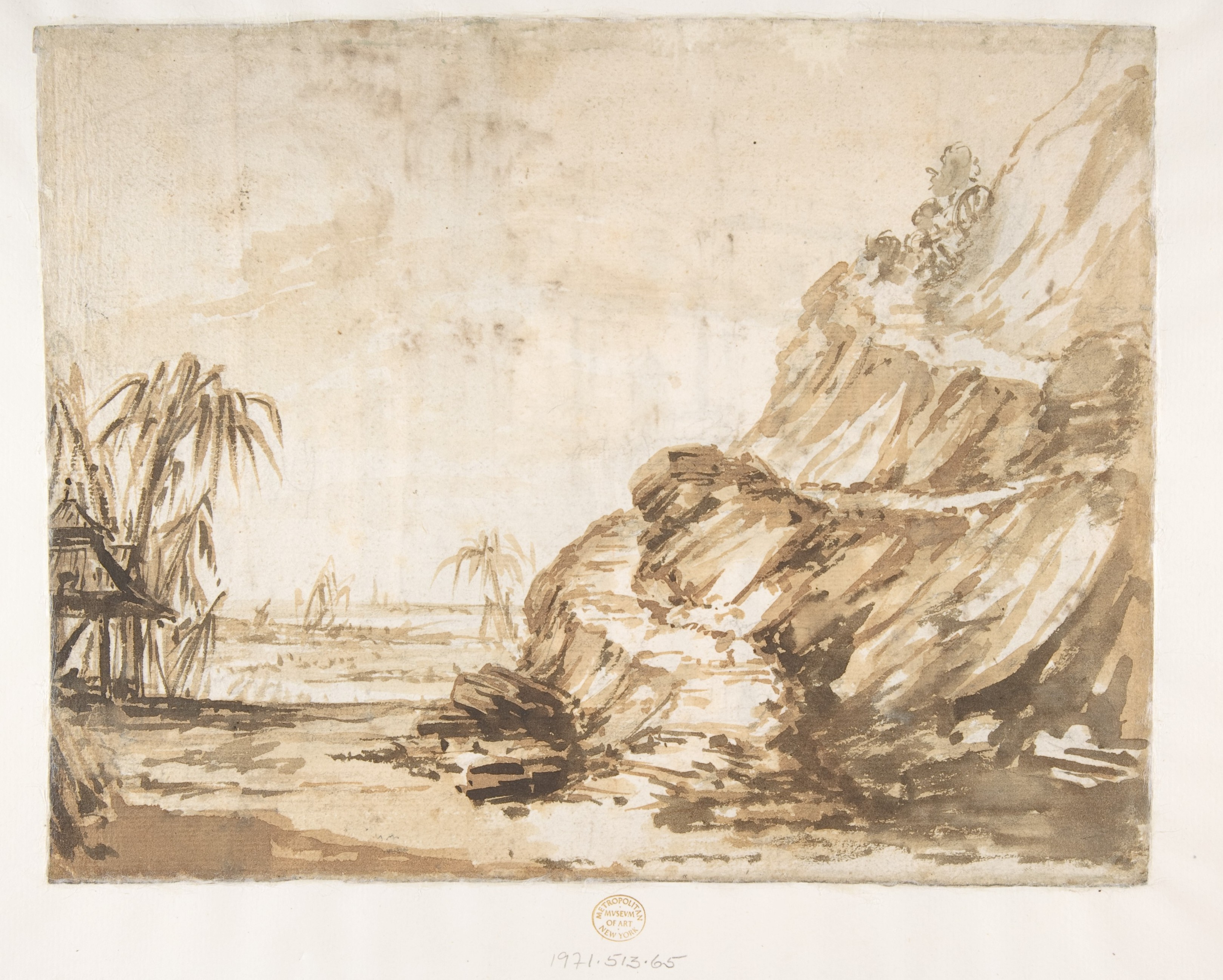
Sea scene, New York, Metropolitan Museum of Art
