= Giovanni Battista Crosato =

Italian painter

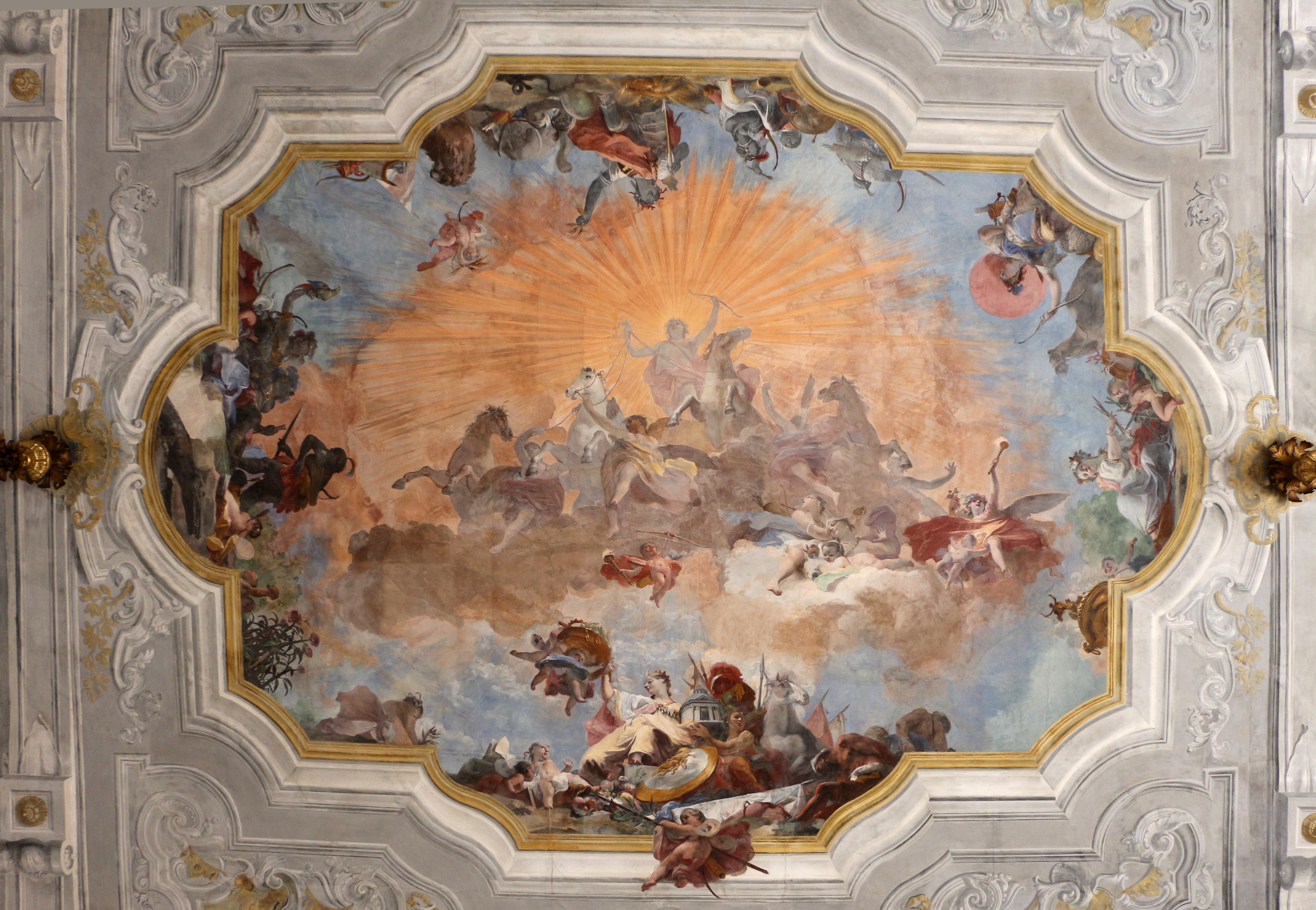
- Ballroom ceiling of the Ca' Rezzonico with ceiling by Giovanni Battista Crosato (1753)
- Born: 1686; Venice, Republic of Venice
- Died: 15 July 1758 (aged 71–72); Venice, Republic of Venice
- Known for: Painting
- Notable work: Illusionistic quadratura painting on the ceiling of Ca' Rezzonico
- Movement: Rococo

Giovanni Battista Crosato (1686 – July 15, 1758) was an Italian Rococo painter of quadratura, active in Venice and in Turin.

== Biography ==
=== Early career, to 1746 ===
Giovanni Battista Crosato was born in Venice, where he received his first training. He was influenced by Ricci and Amigoni, enriching their style with a vein of animated Emilian solidity. By 1733 he had moved to Turin, where he was recruited to fresco in the Palazzina of Stupinigi. He returned to Venice in 1736, where he was admitted to the Venetian painters' guild (the Fraglia). Soon after, he received commissions for decorations in the churches of Santa Maria dei Servi and San Moisè and in Ca' Pesaro. Returning to Turin in 1740, he began working on commissions he received for the churches and homes located in and around the city. Between 1740 and 1742 he decorated several churches – La Consolata, Santi Marco e Leonardo, the Immacolata Concezione, Sant'Andrea in Chieri, the Visitazione in Pinerolo and the Palazzo Birago di Borgaro (now Palazzo della Valle). He also worked as a scenic designer for the Teatro Regio.

=== Mature work ===
With the one possible exception of a third trip to Turin in 1749–50, Crosato remained in Venice from 1746 until his death. He was busy with commissions for churches in the city and many of the villas that surround it. Documents record that in 1748 he decorated the parish church in Ponte di Brenta. He also painted frescoes in the Villa Algarotti in Mestre about this time, and in the Villa Marcello in Levada he painted a ceiling decoration depicting the gods and goddesses of Olympus and four wall frescoes of scenes from the Life of Alexander the Great. During the 1750s he completed the fresco of the Triumph of Juno in the Palazzo da Mosto and the spectacular ballroom of Ca’ Rezzonico, both in Venice. The ballroom ceiling fresco portrays the Chariot of Apollo with a brilliant display of light-orange rays emanating from the head of the sun god as he guides the chariot pulled by four grey-white horses through the four corners of the world. Crosato was a master of illusionism, and here he created vast expanses of blue sky with putti and clouds spilling over the edges of the framework. These late works show that neither his abilities nor his use of vibrant colours diminished with age.

In 1755 he was invited to become a member of the Accademia di Belle Arti di Venezia, of which Giovanni Battista Tiepolo was president. Crosato continued to attend meetings until the beginning of 1758, when he became fatally ill. He died in Venice on July 15, 1758. Among his pupils was Bernardino Galliari. In addition to being a fresco painter, Crosato was involved in making sets for the Teatro San Giovanni Grisostomo in Venice and designed engravings for Pietro Monaco and others. He rarely changed his pleasing combination of bright bold colours, clear even lighting and hard linear forms. By his travels, he helped to spread the light and airy Venetian Rococo style. Bernardino Galliari in particular imitated Crosato’s brilliant manner in his own set designs for the Teatro Regio in Turin and his decorations for villas in Lombardy.

== Gallery ==
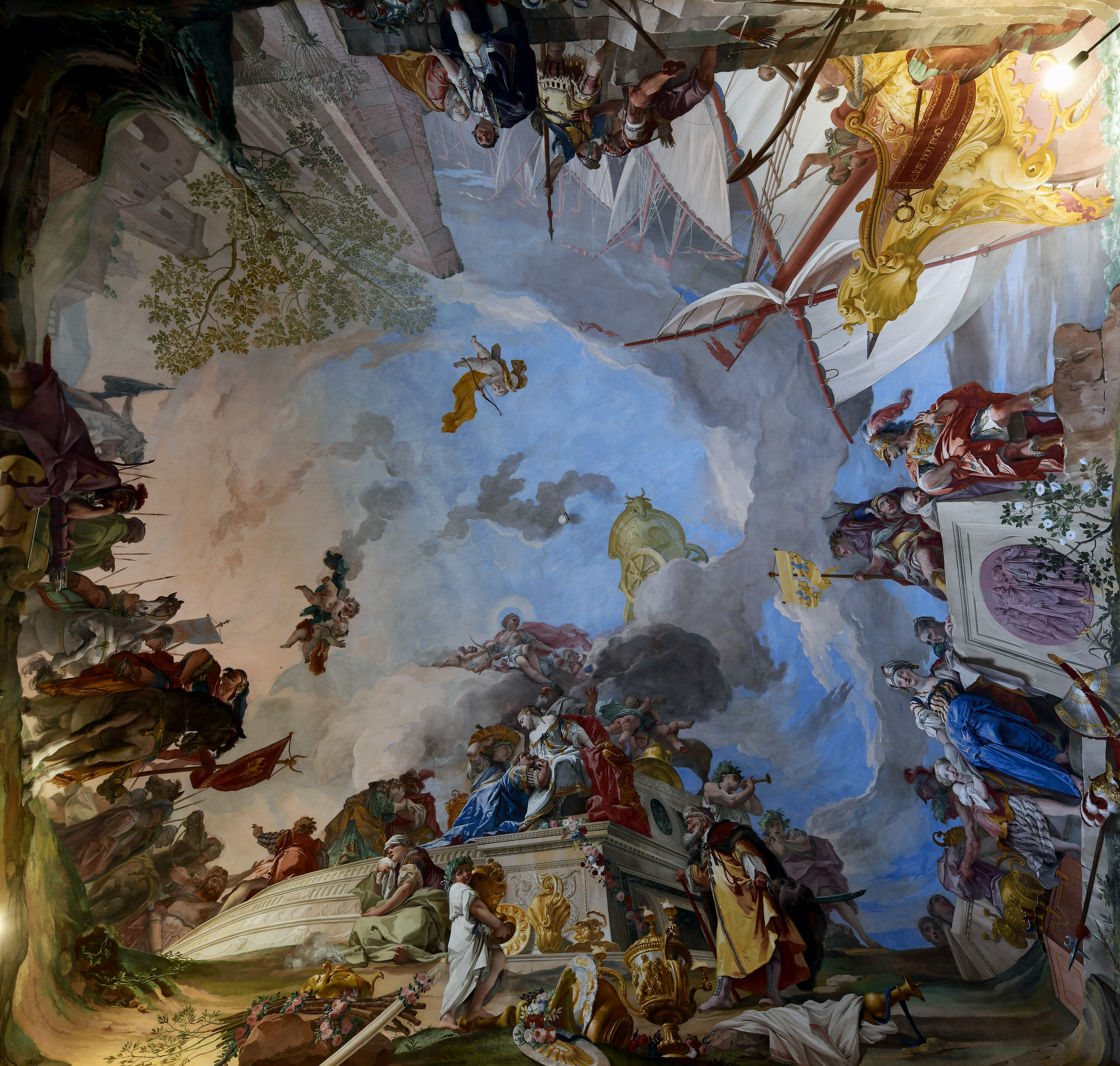
Ceiling in the Queen room of the Palazzina di Caccia of Stupinigi, 1733

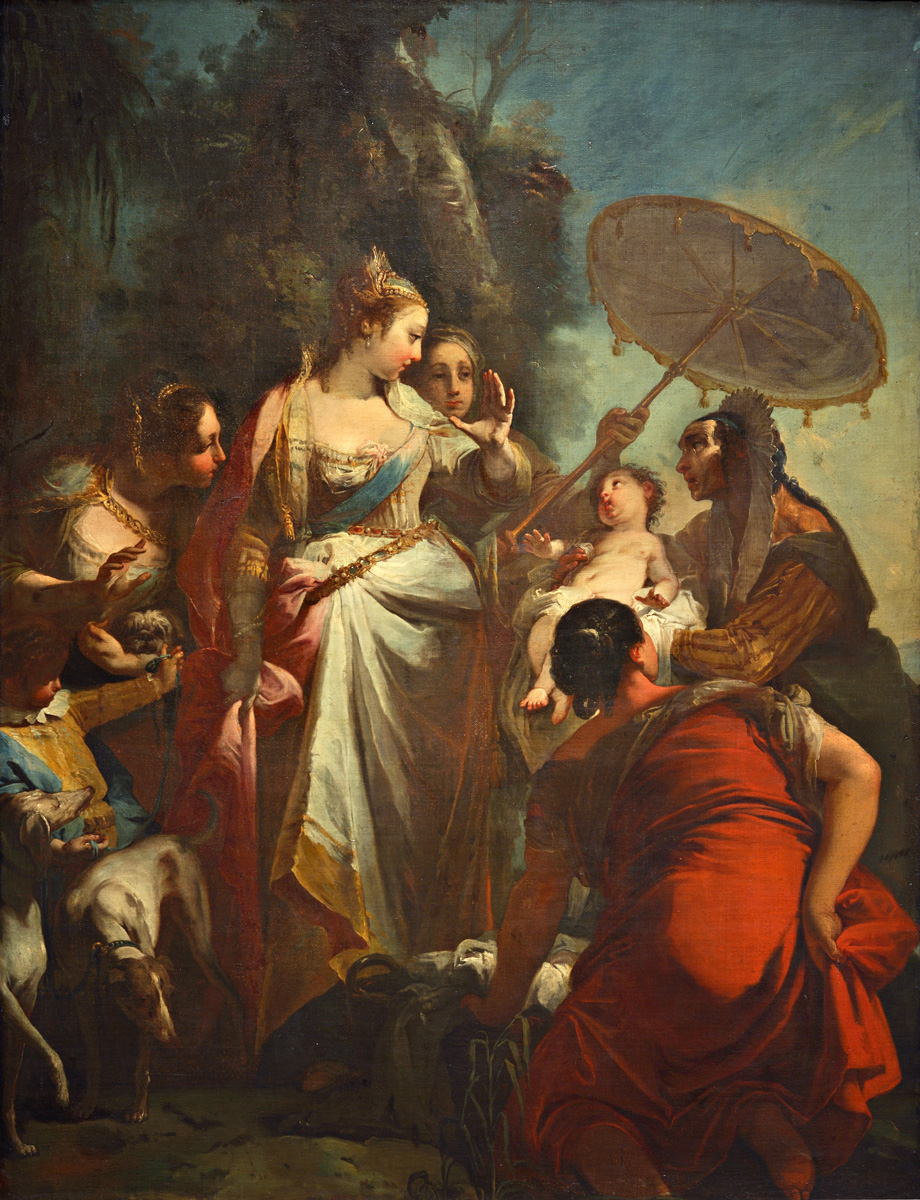
Finding of Moses, Pushkin Museum, Moscow

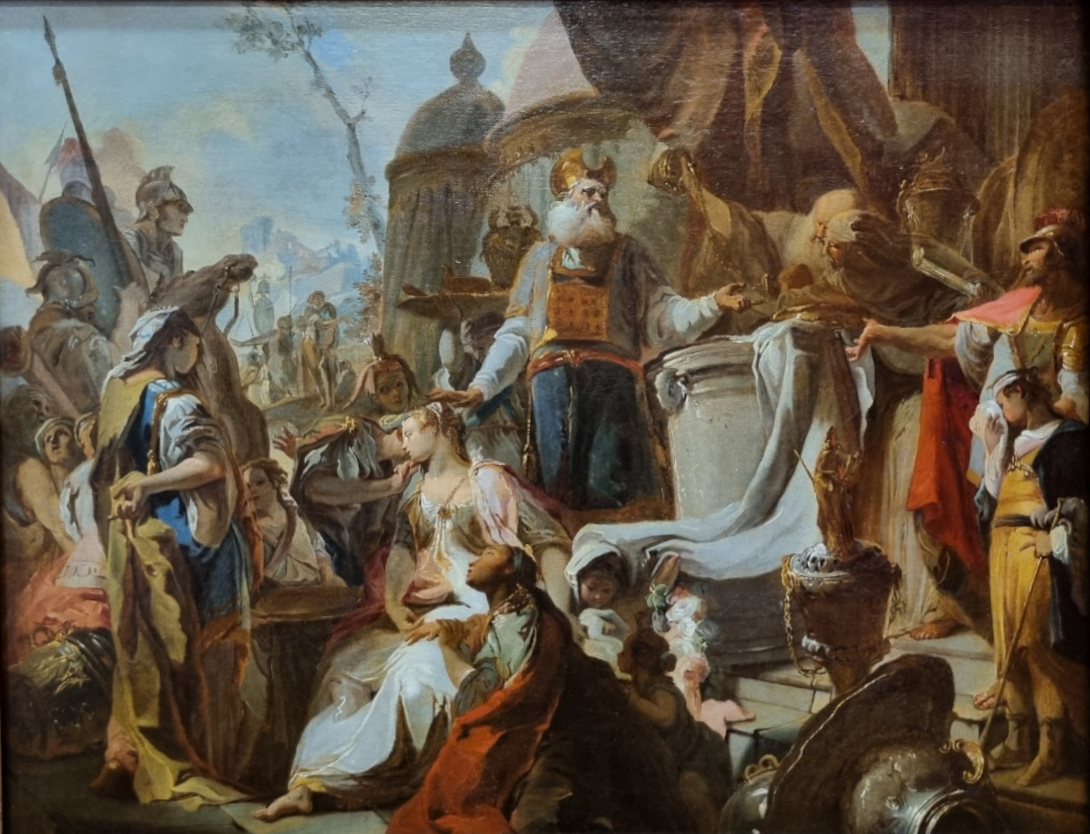
The Sacrifice of Jephthah's Daughter, c. 1750, Musée Magnin, Dijon

== Bibliography ==
- Zanetti, Antonio Maria (1771). Delle pitture veneziane. Venice: Giambatista Albrizzi. p. 454.
- D'Arcais, Francesca (1985). "CROSATO, Giovanni Battista". Dizionario Biografico degli Italiani (in Italian). Vol. 31: Cristaldi–Dalla Nave. Rome: Istituto dell'Enciclopedia Italiana. ISBN 978-88-12-00032-6.
