= Paolo Landriani =

Italian painter and architect

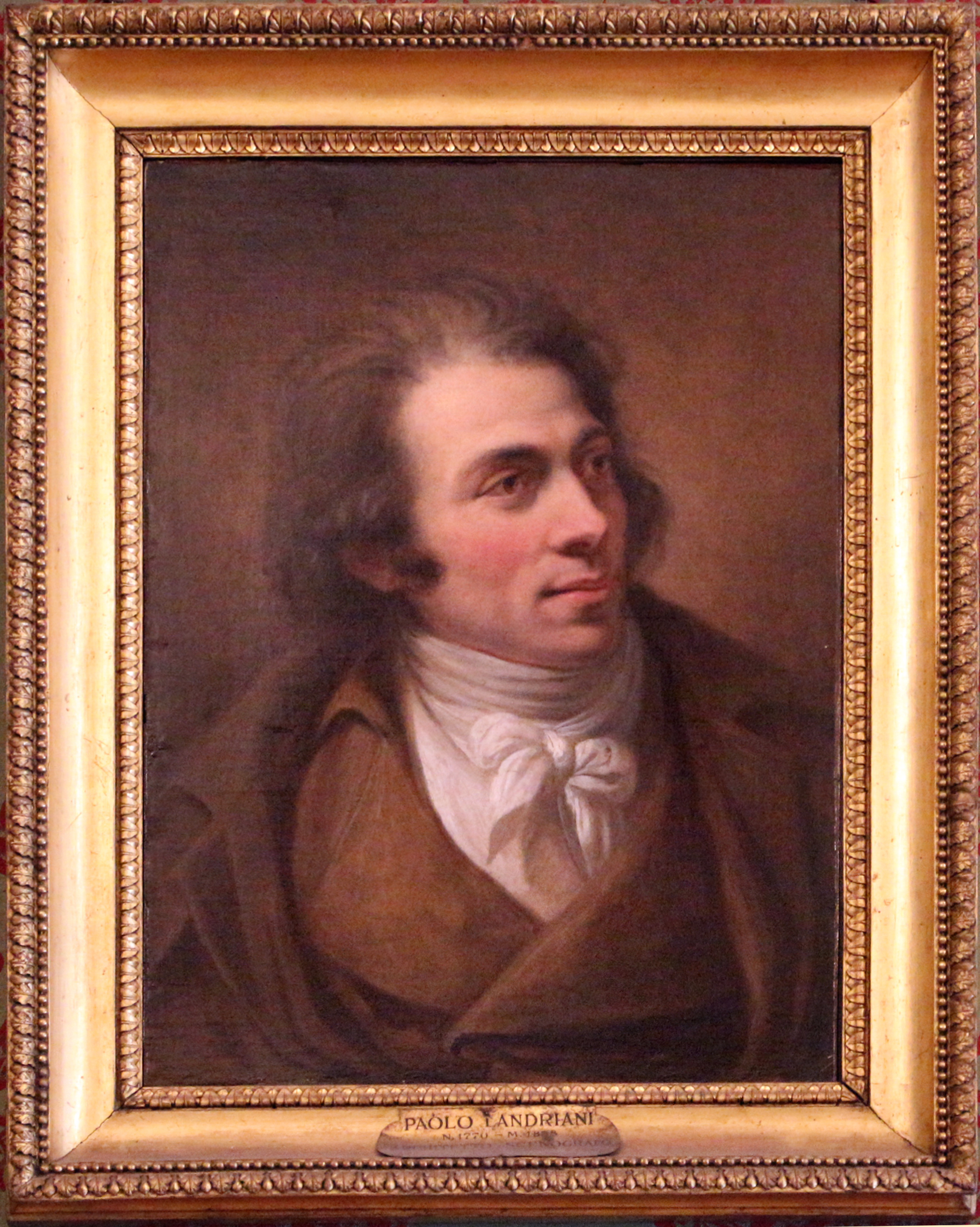
Andrea Appiani, Portrait of Paolo Landriani

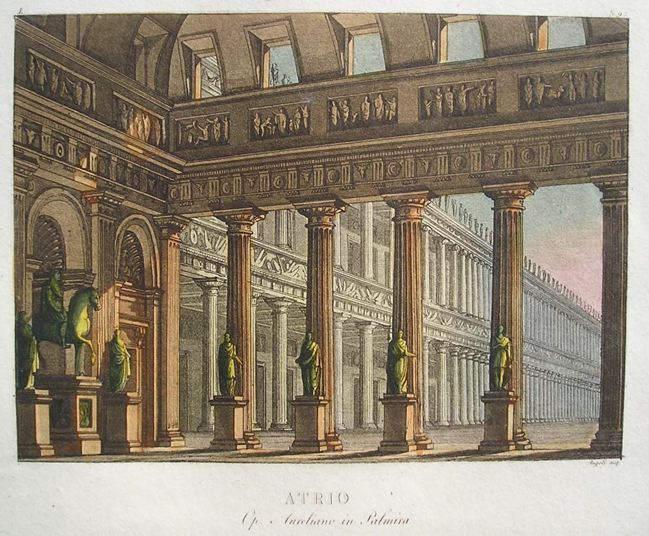
A stage setting for Act I of Aureliano in Palmira by Paolo Landriani. Aquatint and watercolour.

Paolo Landriani (1757–1839) was an Italian painter and architect.

He was born at Milan, and studied under Gonzaga. He was employed at La Scala theatre, and became reputed as a decorator. He followed especially the principles of Bibiena and Bernardino Galliari. Giovanni Perego and Alessandro Sanquirico were his pupils when he taught at the Brera Academy. Landriani published a history of the principal theaters of Europe. He died at Milan.

His relationship to Paolo Camillo Landriani is unclear.
