= San Giuseppe di Casto =

- Frazione
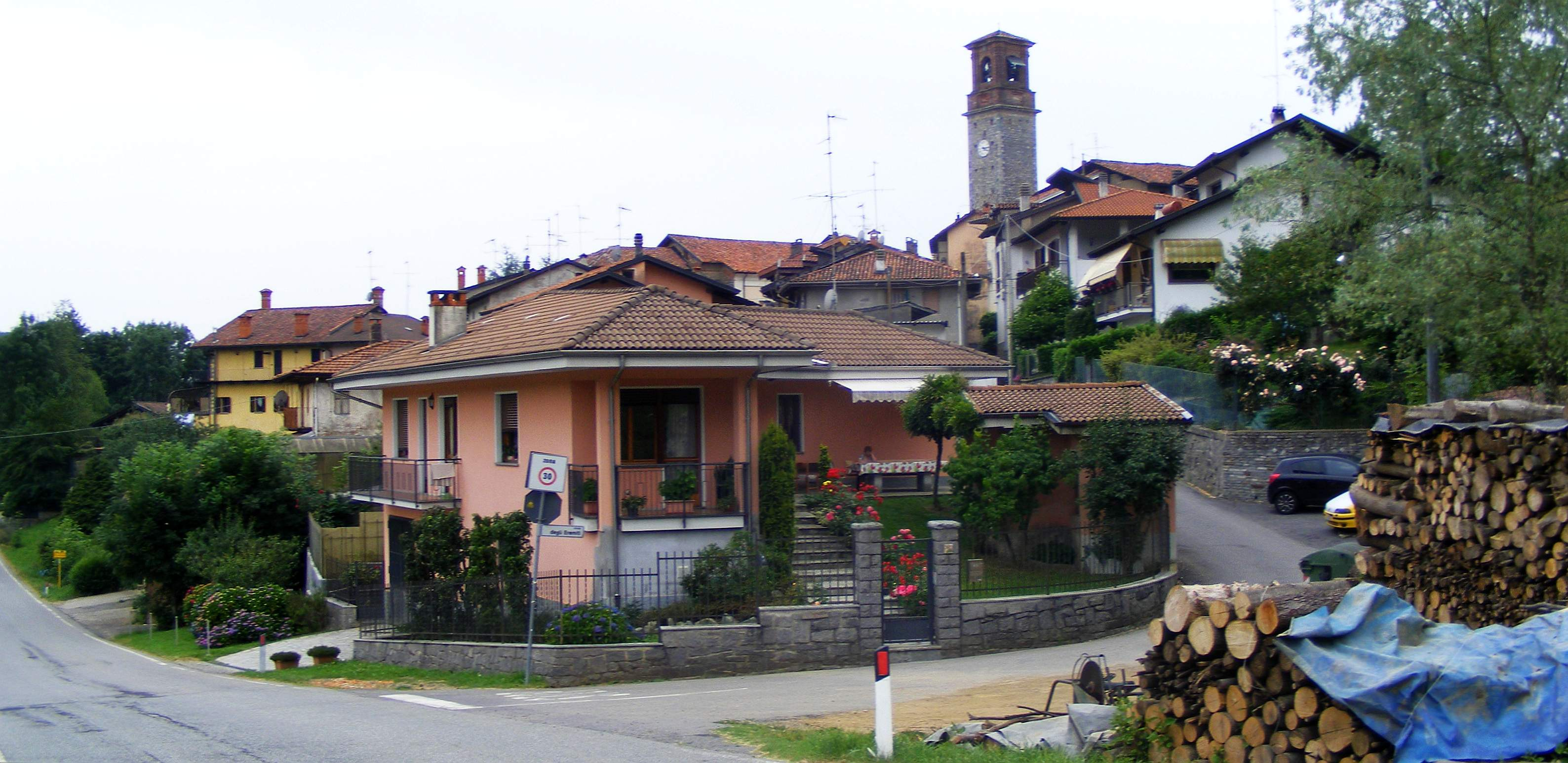
- Panoramic view

- Location of San Giuseppe di Casto in Italy
- Coordinates: 45°37′11″N 8°4′26″E
- Country: Italy
- Region: Piedmont
- Province: Biella (BI)
- Comune: Andorno Micca
- Elevation: 669 m (2,195 ft)
- Time zone: UTC+1 (CET)
  - Summer (DST): UTC+2 (CEST)
- Postal code: 13811
- Dialing code: (+39) 015

San Giuseppe di Casto is a frazione (and parish) of the municipality of Andorno Micca, in Piedmont, northern Italy.

== Overview ==
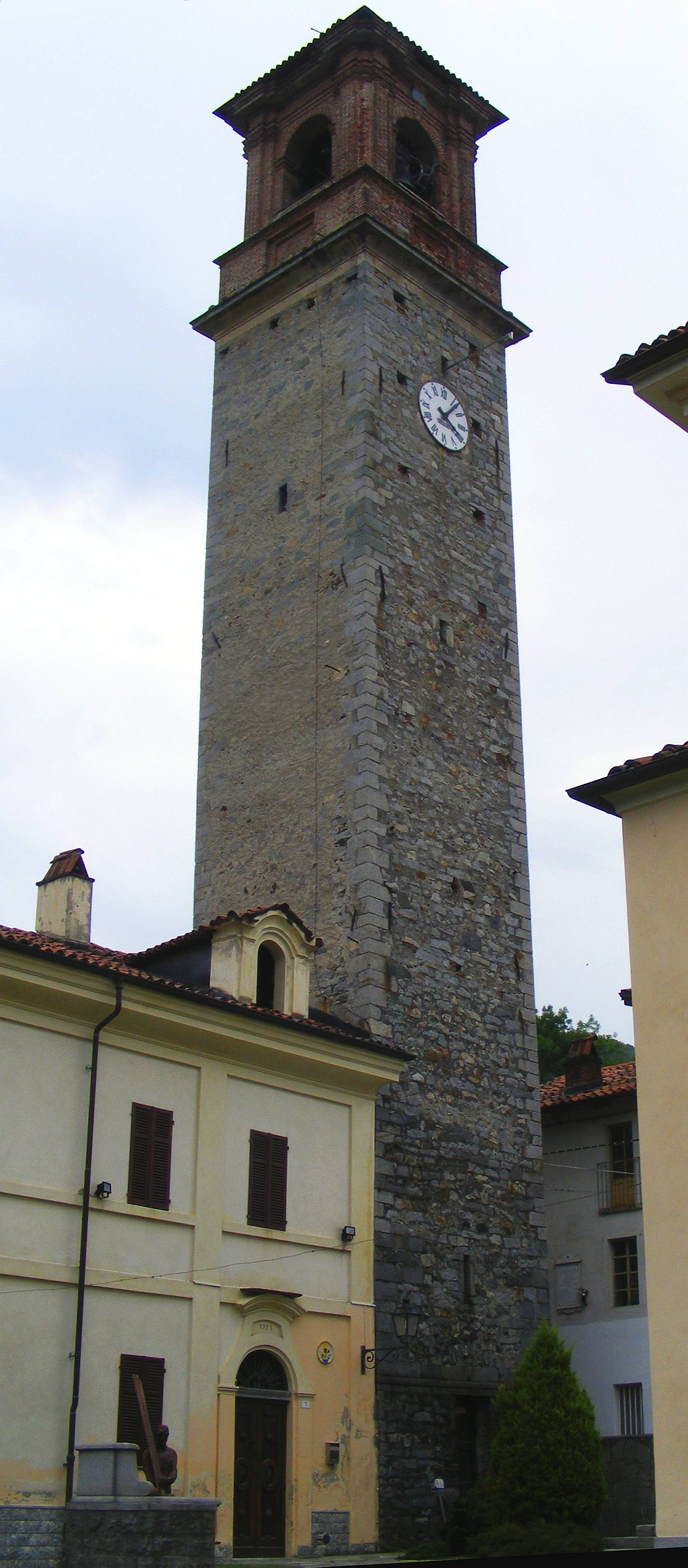
Church tower

It is a village located some km north-east from the centre of Andorno and takes its name from Saint Joseph and from the Monte Casto, a mountain which dominates from north the village.

== History ==
Since 1929 San Giuseppe di Casto was a separate comune (municipality).
