= Gaspare Galliari =

Italian painter

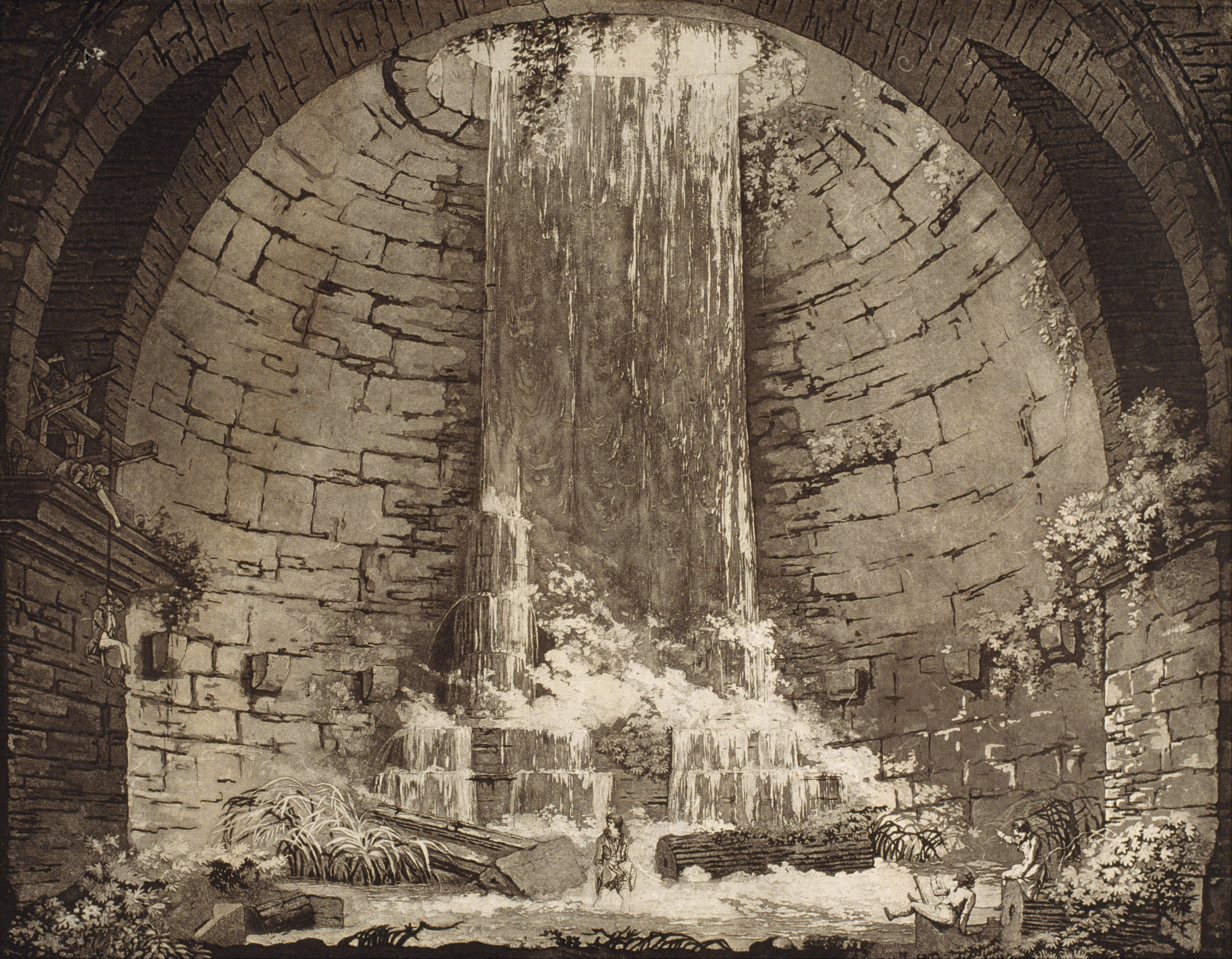
Rotunda converted as baths, original by Galliari, engraved in 1803 by Luigi Rados

Gaspare Galliari (1760–1818; some sources give 1761 for the year of birth or 1823 for the year of death) was an Italian painter.

He was born in Treviglio, and died in Milan. The collection of the Brera Pinacotheca in Milan has one of his paintings depicting a view of Venice.

He is described as a master of scenography as he painted scene bernesche and capricci.

Gaspare was also the son of Gian Antonio Galliari and he was born into a large family of artists:

- Giovanni Galliari d’ Andorno-Cacciorna, painter.
- Bernardino Galliari (1707–1794), first son of Giovanni, figure painter. Painted in Berlin Theater, also painted various theaters and curtains in the Milan area. Died in Andorno.
- Fabrizio Galliari (1709–1790), second son of Giovanni, quadraturista. He painted in many churches and palaces. He painted the cupola of the Cathedral of Vercelli. In 1778, he became professor at the Albertina Academy. Born in Andorno, died in Treviglio.
- Gian Antonio Galliari (1718–1783), third son of Giovanni, still-life painter of flowers. Born in Andorno, died in Milan.
- Giovannino Galliari, son of Fabrizio, quadraturista, travelled to Paris and Berlin, painted the duomo at Biella, and a salon in the Turin Academy of Sciences, died in 1819 in Treviglio.
- Giuseppino Galliari, son of Fabrizio, Mannerist figure painter, scenographer, died in 1817 at Milan.
