= Domenico Menozzi =

Italian painter

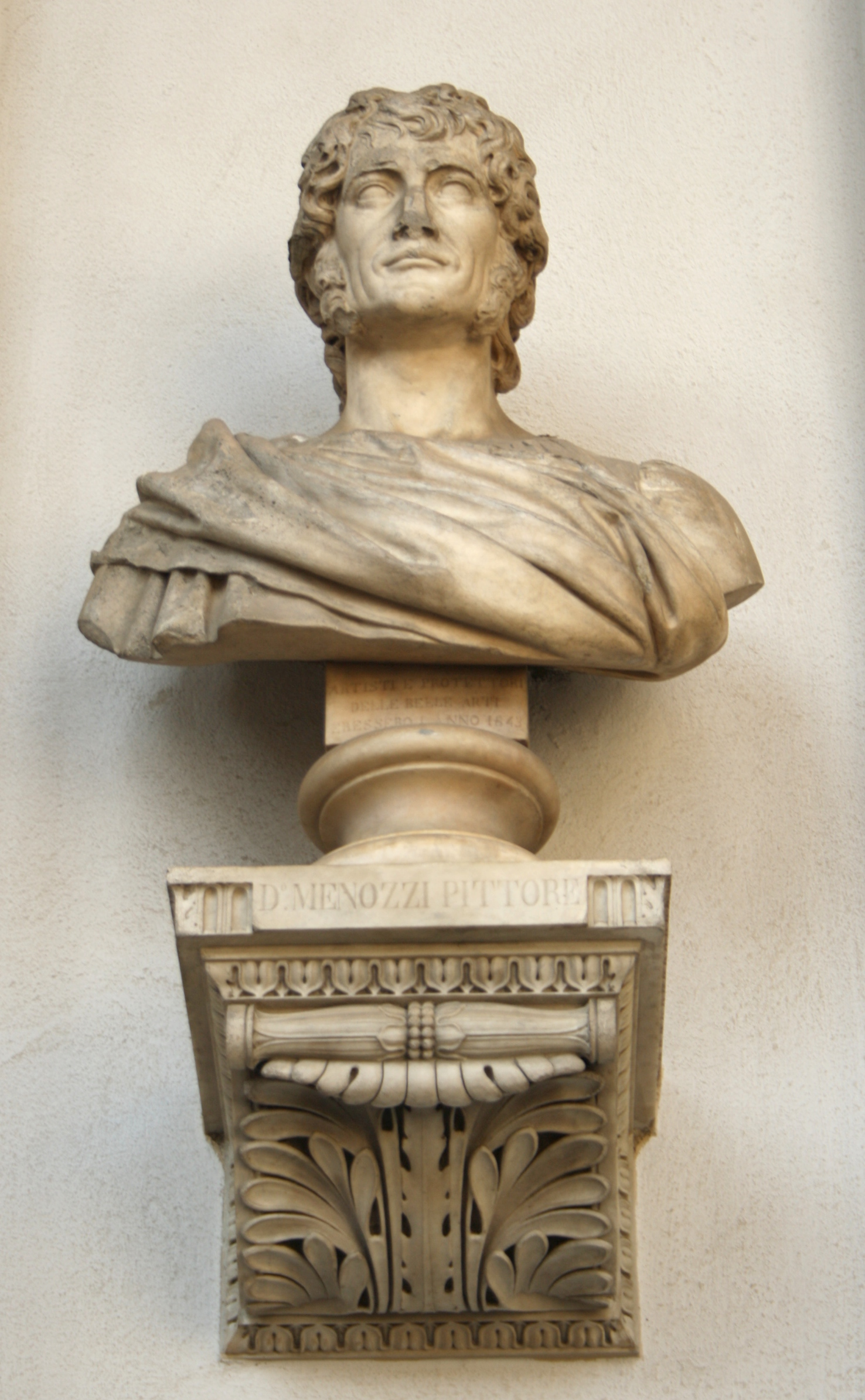
Bust of Menozzi at the Brera Academy.

Domenico Menozzi (1777 – 1841) was an Italian painter of the Neoclassical period.

== Biography ==
He was born in Reggio Emilia, but soon moved to Bergamo and then Milan in 1801, where he was active for more than three decades as a landscape and decorative painter, but best remembered as a scenic designer. In Reggio, he is said to have painted for the house of Vincenzo Linari and the Lawyer Bongiovanni.
