= Bernardino Galliari =

Italian painter

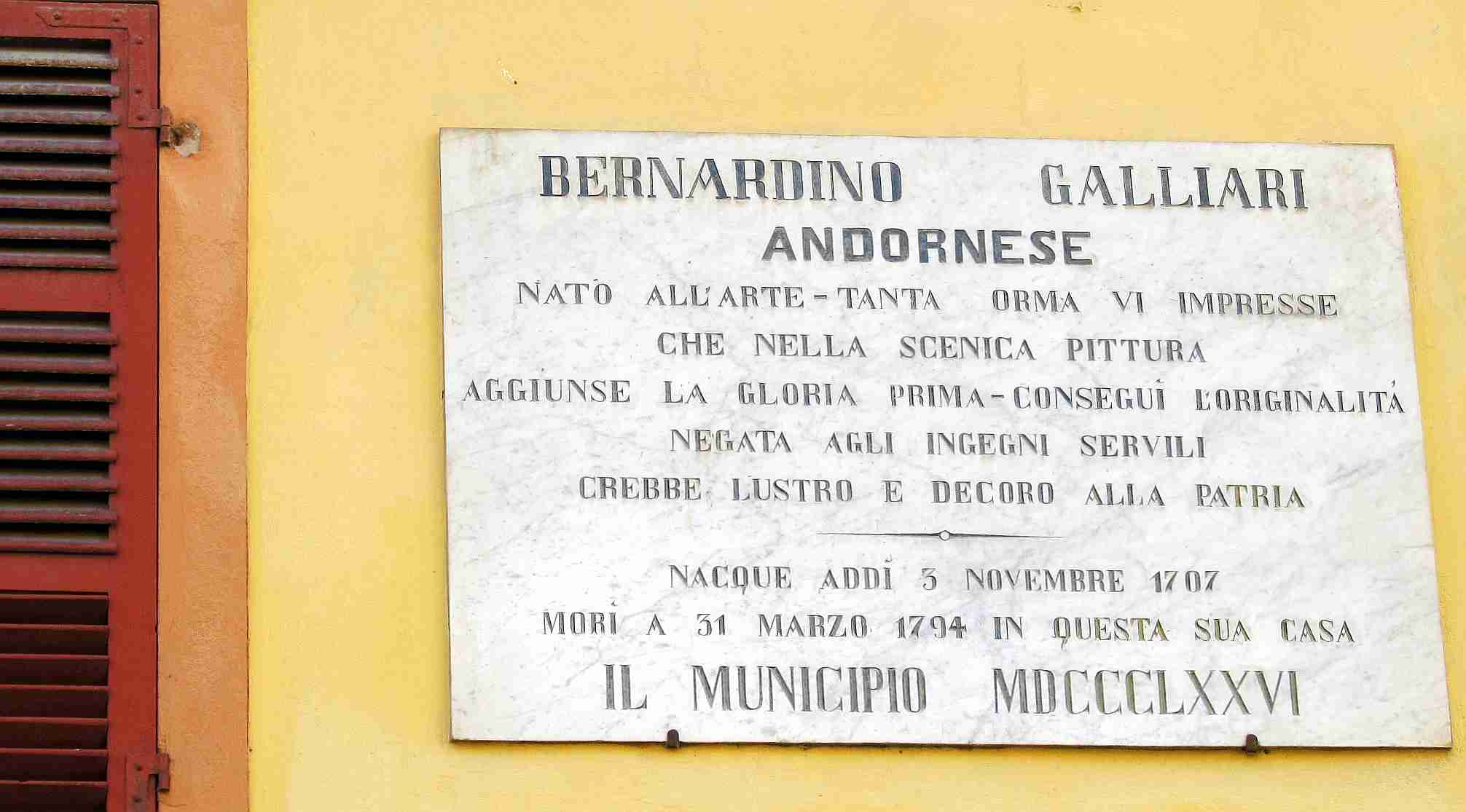
Memorial plaque for Galliari on his birth house in Andorno Micca

Bernardino Galliari (1707–1794) was an Italian painter, active mainly as a scenic designer and decorator of theaters.

== Biography ==
He was born at Andorno in the Province of Biella in the Piedmont. He painted an Adoration of the Shepherds by him in the Brera at Milan.

In addition from learning from family members, he is said to have learned to paint quadratura with Giovanni Battista Crosato. He was sought after not only in Italy but also in Germany and France. Bernardino was the first son of Giovanni. He was born into a large family of artists:

- Giovanni Galliari d’ Andorno-Cacciorna, painter.
- Fabrizio Galliari (1709–1790), second son of Giovanni, quadraturista. He painted in many churches and palaces. He painted the cupola of the Cathedral of Vercelli. In 1778, he became professor at the Albertina Academy.
- Gian Antonio Galliari (1718–1783), third son of Giovanni, still-life painter of flowers. Born in Andorno, died in Milan.
- Giovannino Galliari, son of Fabrizio, quadraturista, travelled to Paris and Berlin, painted the duomo at Biella, and a salon in the Turin Academy of Sciences, died in 1819 in Treviglio.
- Giuseppino Galliari, son of Fabrizio, Mannerist figure painter, scenographer, died in 1817 at Milan.
- Gaspare Galliari was the son of Gian Antonio.
