= Carlo Ferrari =

Italian painter (1813–1871)

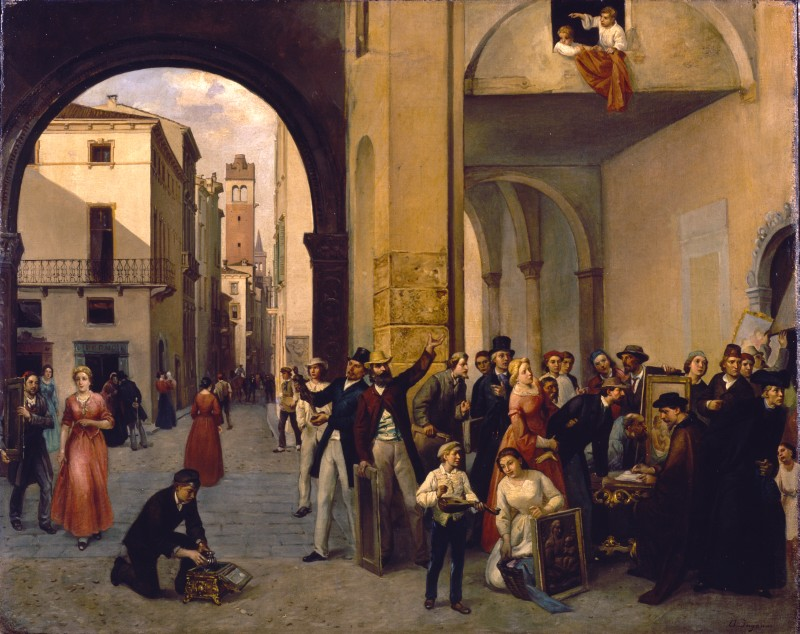
Doni alla patria, ca. 1865–71 (Fondazione Cariplo)

Carlo Ferrari (1813–1871), called il Ferrarin, was an Italian painter.

== Biography ==
He was born in Verona and studied sporadically at the Cignaroli Academy of Fine Arts there, while practising as a copyist and restorer in the studio of the fresco painter Pietro Nanin.

Ferrari made his debut at the 1837 exhibition at the Verona Academy with a series of views of the city enlivened by genre episodes inspired by Flemish painting. These would become typical subjects in the most successful part of his repertoire.

During the 1840s he received increasing public and critical acclaim, which coincided with his participating more frequently in exhibitions, such as the one at the academy in Venice in 1839 and at the Brescia Atheneum in 1840 and the Esposizione di Belle Arti at the Brera Academy in Milan in 1844, and also established himself as one of the leading Veronese painters during the Restoration period. He received important commissions from the local nobility and the Austrian officers based in Verona thanks to his being in favour with Field Marshal Radetzky, for whom his views of the Venetian Lagoon inspired by the 18th-century veduta model were mainly destined. The artist's international fame and market appeal reached their height around 1851, following Emperor Franz Josef's visit to his studio which guaranteed him an international clientele of the highest order.

During his late period he was highly active as a painter and engraver, specialising in the interpretation of Renaissance works, and he also became a connoisseur by working closely with the Veronese collector Cesare Bernasconi. Ferrari died in Verona in 1871.

== Bibliography ==
- Elena Lissoni, Carlo Ferrari, online catalogue Artgate by Fondazione Cariplo, 2010, CC BY-SA (source for the first revision of this article).

== Other projects ==
Media related to Carlo Ferrari (painter) at Wikimedia Commons
