= Andorno Micca =

Andorno Micca Andorn
- Comune
- Comune di Andorno Micca
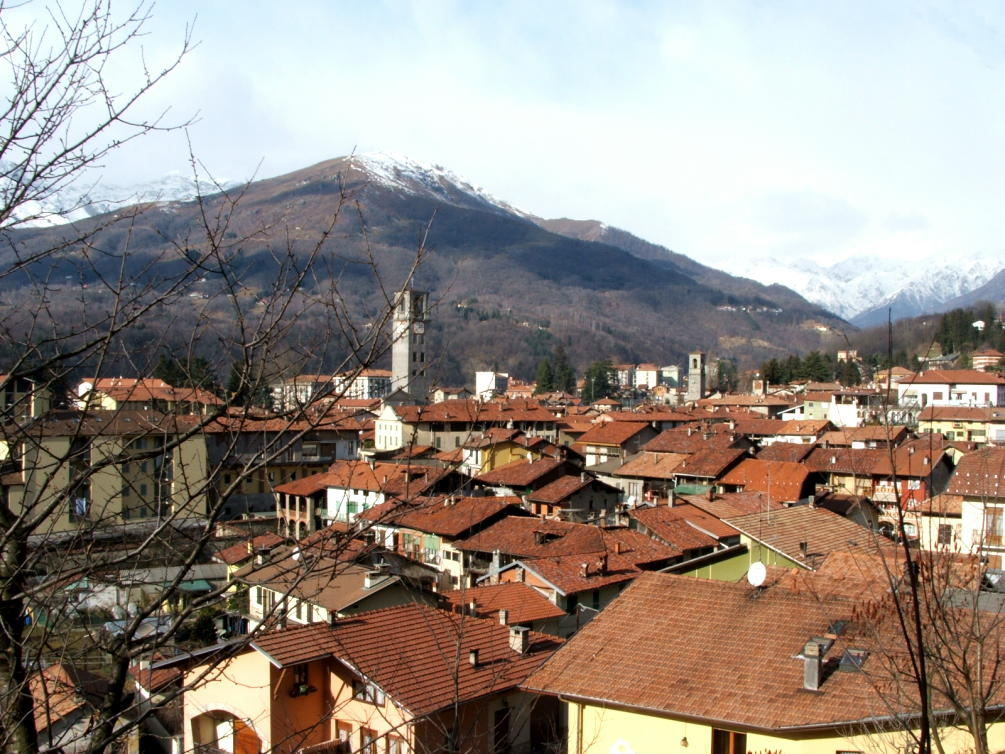
- View of Andorno Micca

- Coat of arms

- Location of Andorno Micca in Italy Andorno Micca (Piedmont)
- Coordinates: 45°36′N 8°3′E
- Country: Italy
- Region: Piedmont
- Province: Biella (BI)
- Frazioni: Cerruti, Colma, Locato Inferiore, Locato Superiore, Lorazzo Inferiore, Lorazzo Superiore, Ravizza, San Giuseppe di Casto

Government
  - Mayor: Davide Crovella

Area
  - Total: 11.89 km^{2} (4.59 sq mi)
- Elevation: 544 m (1,785 ft)

Population (1-1-2017)
  - Total: 3,263
  - Density: 274.4/km^{2} (710.8/sq mi)
- Demonym: Andornese(i)
- Time zone: UTC+1 (CET)
  - Summer (DST): UTC+2 (CEST)
- Postal code: 13061
- Dialing code: 015
- Website: Official website

Andorno Micca (Piedmontese: Andorn) is a comune (municipality) in the Province of Biella in the Italian region Piedmont, located about 70 kilometres (43 mi) northeast of Turin and about 4 kilometres (2 mi) northwest of Biella.

== Overview ==
It is located in the Valle Cervo, at the feet of the Biellese Prealps.

The comune takes its second name from Pietro Micca, a hero of the siege of Turin against the French (1706).

The Sacro Monte di Andorno is named after this village, although it is not in the comune territory.

== See also ==
- Ratafia
- San Giuseppe di Casto
