= List of municipalities of the Aosta Valley =

The following is a list of the 74 municipalities (comuni) of the autonomous region of the Aosta Valley in Italy.

== List ==
Municipality	Population (2026)	Area (km²)	Density
Allein	197	7.96	24.7
Antey-Saint-André	552	11.81	46.7
Aosta	33,127	21.39	1,548.7
Arnad	1,215	28.84	42.1
Arvier	819	33.36	24.6
Avise	294	52.62	5.6
Ayas	1,370	129.42	10.6
Aymavilles	2,093	53.24	39.3
Bard	99	3.03	32.7
Bionaz	212	142.09	1.5
Brissogne	979	25.51	38.4
Brusson	823	55.26	14.9
Challand-Saint-Anselme	755	27.99	27.0
Challand-Saint-Victor	577	25.16	22.9
Chambave	880	21.54	40.9
Chamois	113	14.53	7.8
Champdepraz	702	48.79	14.4
Champorcher	360	68.43	5.3
Charvensod	2,411	25.86	93.2
Châtillon	4,299	39.68	108.3
Cogne	1,329	213.04	6.2
Courmayeur	2,494	209.61	11.9
Donnas	2,394	33.97	70.5
Doues	509	16.25	31.3
Émarèse	232	10.23	22.7
Étroubles	484	39.57	12.2
Fénis	1,779	68.12	26.1
Fontainemore	437	31.71	13.8
Gaby	404	32.17	12.6
Gignod	1,679	25.98	64.6
Gressan	3,323	25.30	131.3
Gressoney-La-Trinité	321	66.52	4.8
Gressoney-Saint-Jean	769	69.65	11.0
Hône	1,164	12.64	92.1
Introd	642	20.04	32.0
Issime	372	35.38	10.5
Issogne	1,283	23.61	54.3
Jovençan	701	7.01	100.0
La Magdeleine	107	8.94	12.0
La Salle	2,035	83.94	24.2
La Thuile	746	125.67	5.9
Lillianes	410	18.55	22.1
Montjovet	1,762	18.76	93.9
Morgex	2,066	43.63	47.4
Nus	2,916	57.36	50.8
Ollomont	169	53.48	3.2
Oyace	207	30.56	6.8
Perloz	439	23.27	18.9
Pollein	1,446	15.33	94.3
Pont-Saint-Martin	3,517	6.92	508.2
Pontboset	177	33.56	5.3
Pontey	771	15.75	49.0
Pré-Saint-Didier	955	33.40	28.6
Quart	4,151	62.05	66.9
Rhêmes-Notre-Dame	74	86.84	0.9
Rhêmes-Saint-Georges	165	36.34	4.5
Roisan	984	14.64	67.2
Saint-Christophe	3,436	14.74	233.1
Saint-Denis	372	11.39	32.7
Saint-Marcel	1,283	42.38	30.3
Saint-Nicolas	336	15.46	21.7
Saint-Oyen	188	9.42	20.0
Saint-Pierre	3,242	26.18	123.8
Saint-Rhémy-en-Bosses	353	64.88	5.4
Saint-Vincent	4,432	20.57	215.5
Sarre	4,826	28.28	170.7
Torgnon	577	42.46	13.6
Valgrisenche	193	113.48	1.7
Valpelline	577	31.45	18.3
Valsavarenche	154	138.21	1.1
Valtournenche	2,225	116.15	19.2
Verrayes	1,263	22.36	56.5
Verrès	2,535	8.36	303.2
Villeneuve	1,272	8.80	144.5
