= Valpelline (valley) =

Side valley of the Aosta Valley, Italy

Coordinates: 45.8300°N 7.3300°E

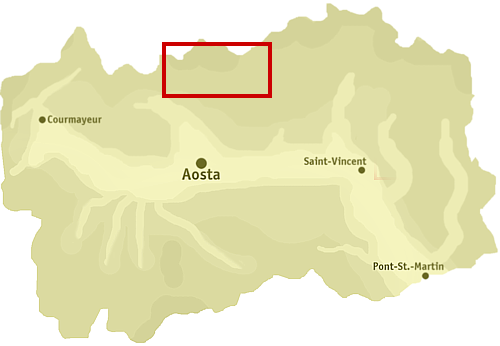
Location of the valley within the Aosta Valley

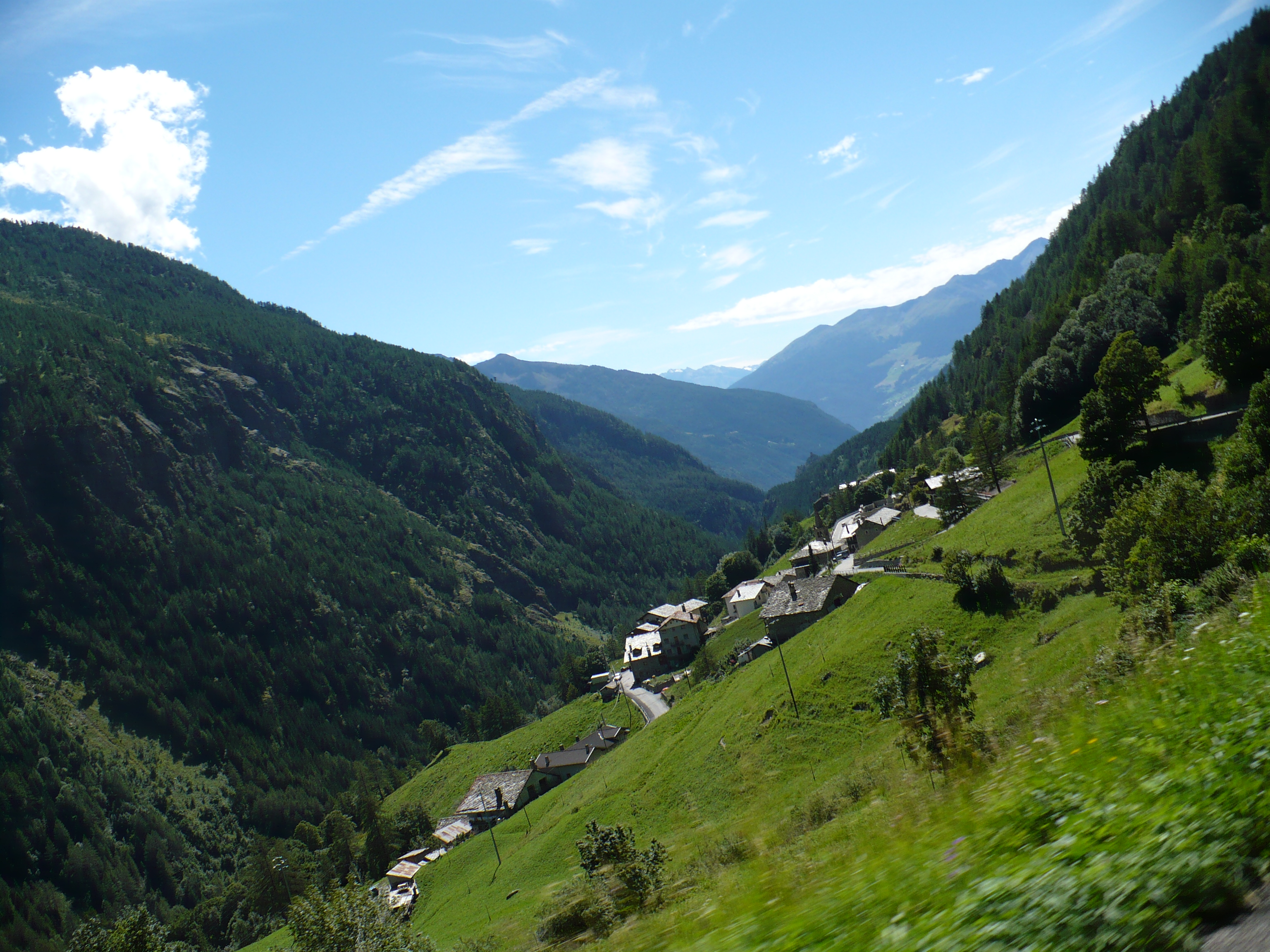
View of the upper Valpelline

Valpelline is one of the side valleys of the Aosta Valley in north-western Italy. It shares its name with one of the communes within its territory (Valpelline).

The stream running through the Valpelline is the Buthier.

== Geography ==
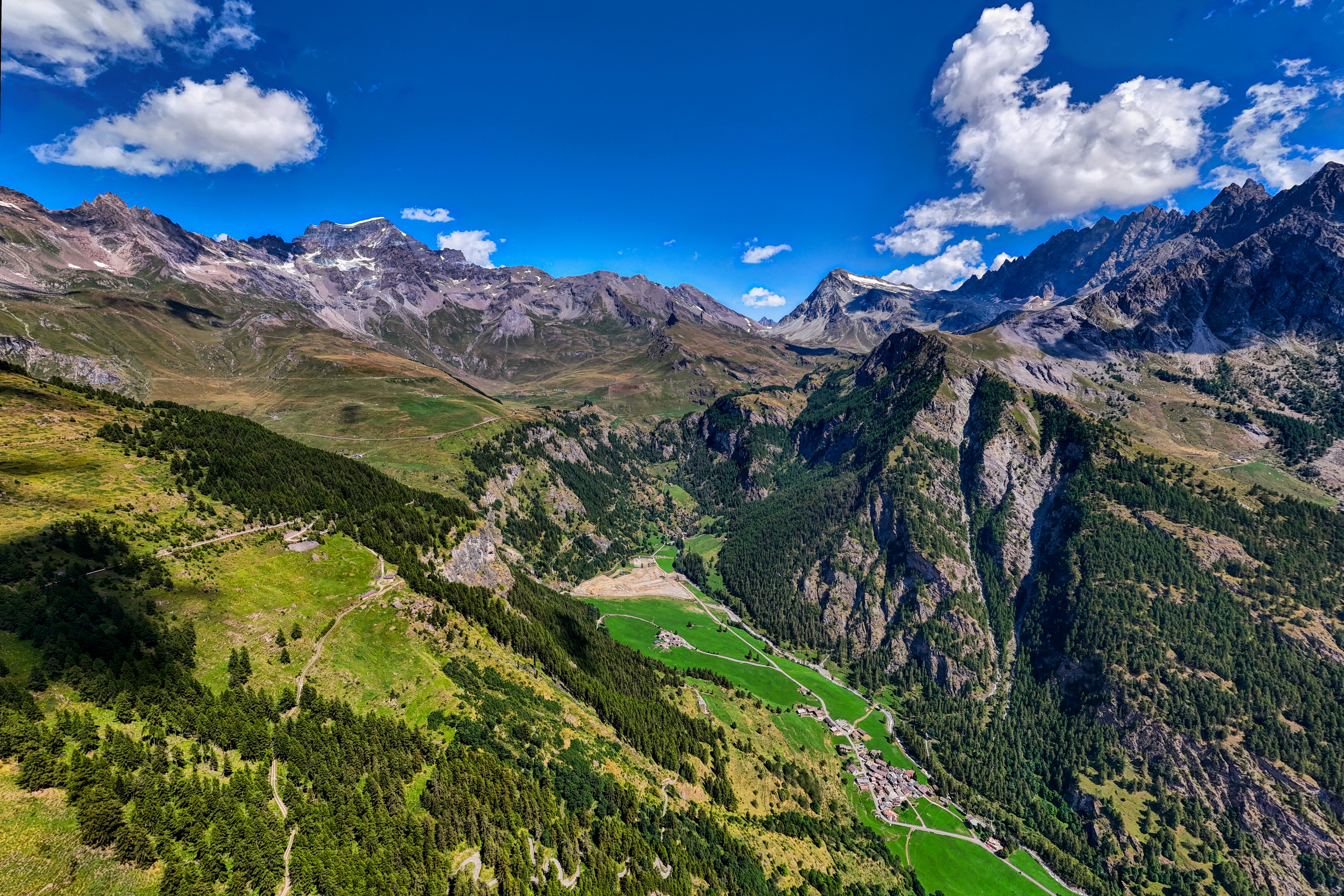
View of the Ollomont valley

The Valpelline branches from the Great St Bernard Valley near Gignod and rises to the Collon Pass, which it shares with Valais, and which is located at the foot of the Grand Combin, whose peak is across the border in Switzerland.

=== Principal mountains ===
- Dent d'Hérens (4,171 m)
- Punta Margherita (Pointe Marguerite) (3,905 m)
- Dents des Bouquetins (3,838 m)
- Tête de Valpelline (3,802 m)
- Tête Blanche (3,724 m)
- Mont Vélan (3,708 m)
- Gran Becca Blanchen (3,680 m)
- Grande Tête de By (3,587 m)
- Aouille Tseuque (3,554 m)
- Mont Brulé (3,538 m)
- Becca Rayette (3,529 m)
- Mont Gelé (3,519 m)
- Becca di Luseney (Pic de Luseney) (3,504 m)
- Punta Kurz (3,496 m)
- Château des Dames (3,488 m)
- Punta di Fontanella (3,384 m)
- Becca di Chardoney (Pic de Chardoney) (3,447 m)
- Punta Cian (Pointe Tsan) (3,320 m).

=== Rivers ===
The main stream of the Valpelline is Buthier, which is fed by melt-waters of the Tsa de Tsan and Grandes Murailles glaciers.

=== Lakes ===
- Place-Moulin Lake (1,950 m)

=== Alpine passes ===
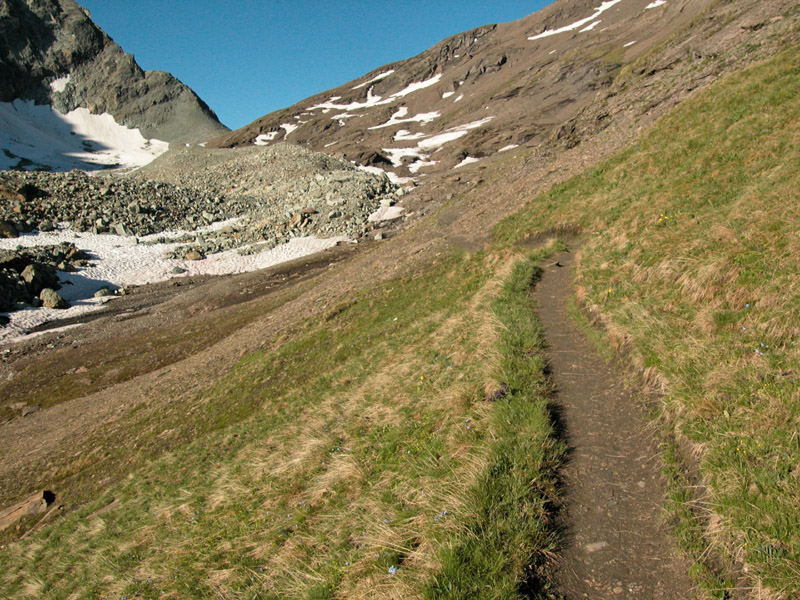
The footpath leading from Switzerland to the Fenêtre de Durand.

Valpelline has no convenient crossings to its neighbouring valleys. However the principal passes are as follows:

- Valpelline Pass (3,562 m) to Mattertal
- Col d'Oren (3,242 m) to the valley of Bagnes
- Collon Pass (3,130 m ) to Val d'Herens
- Valcornera Pass (3,066 m) to the Valtournenche valley
- Crête Sèche Pass (2,888) to the valley of Bagnes
- Vessona Pass (2,794 m) to the Saint-Barthélemy valley
- Fenêtre de Durand (2,786 m) to the valley of Bagnes

== Climate ==
The Valpelline is known locally in Valdôtain patois as the Coumba frèida (or Fr., Combe froide, literally the cold hollow) due to its particularly harsh climate.

== History ==
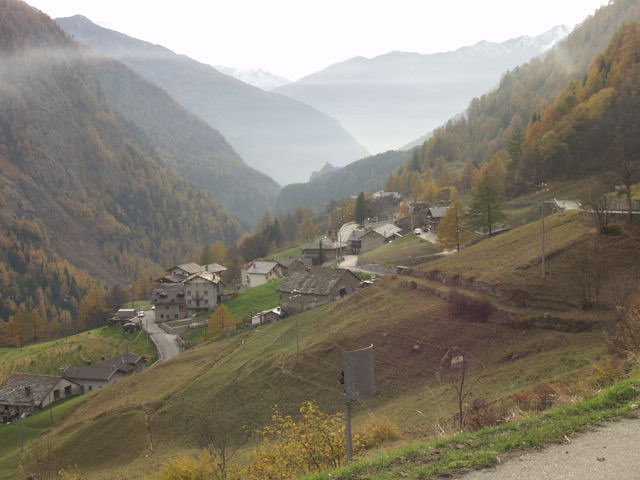
The Bionaz Valley

The valley was for a long period a site of exchange—or of conflict—with the neighbouring Valais.

In the Middle Ages the valley was a possession of the lords of Quart, which they granted to the noble family of the district known as La Tour-de-Valpelline (or La-Tour-des-Prés).

On the extinction of the Quart Family in 1377, Valpelline passed to the House of Savoy. In 1612 it was assigned to the Perrone di San Martino, a Piedmontese noble family involved in the exploitation of the mine at Ollomont.

The valley was for many centuries difficult of access: the first carriage road to Bionaz was constructed in 1953.

== Centres of population ==
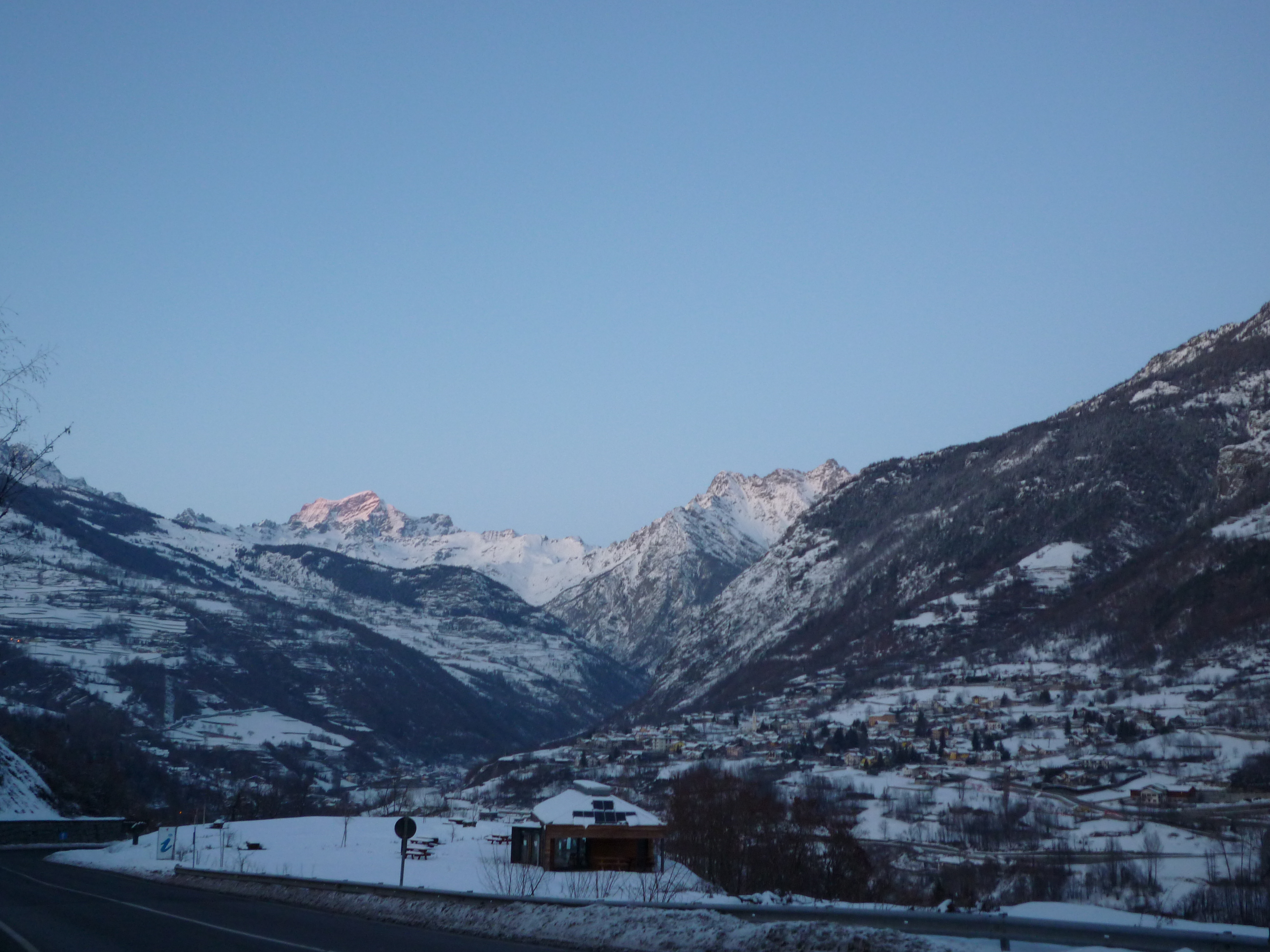
The upper Valpelline valley seen from Gignod. The Grand Combin appears in the background

- Bionaz
- Doues
- Oyace
- Ollomont
- Roisan
- Valpelline

== Places of interest ==
=== The parish of Saint-Pantaléon ===
The parish of Saint-Pantaléon de Valpelline is regarded as one of the most ancient of the Great St Bernard Valley. First documented in 1176 it included the settlements of Bionaz, Oyace and Ollomont. The current church, built in 1722, has three important chapels: the first, dedicated to Our Lady of the Snows, is the work of Vignettes (1755); the second, dedicated to Saint Roch, is the work of Semon (1640); and the third, dedicated to Saint Barbara, is the work of Thoules (1663).

== Tourism ==
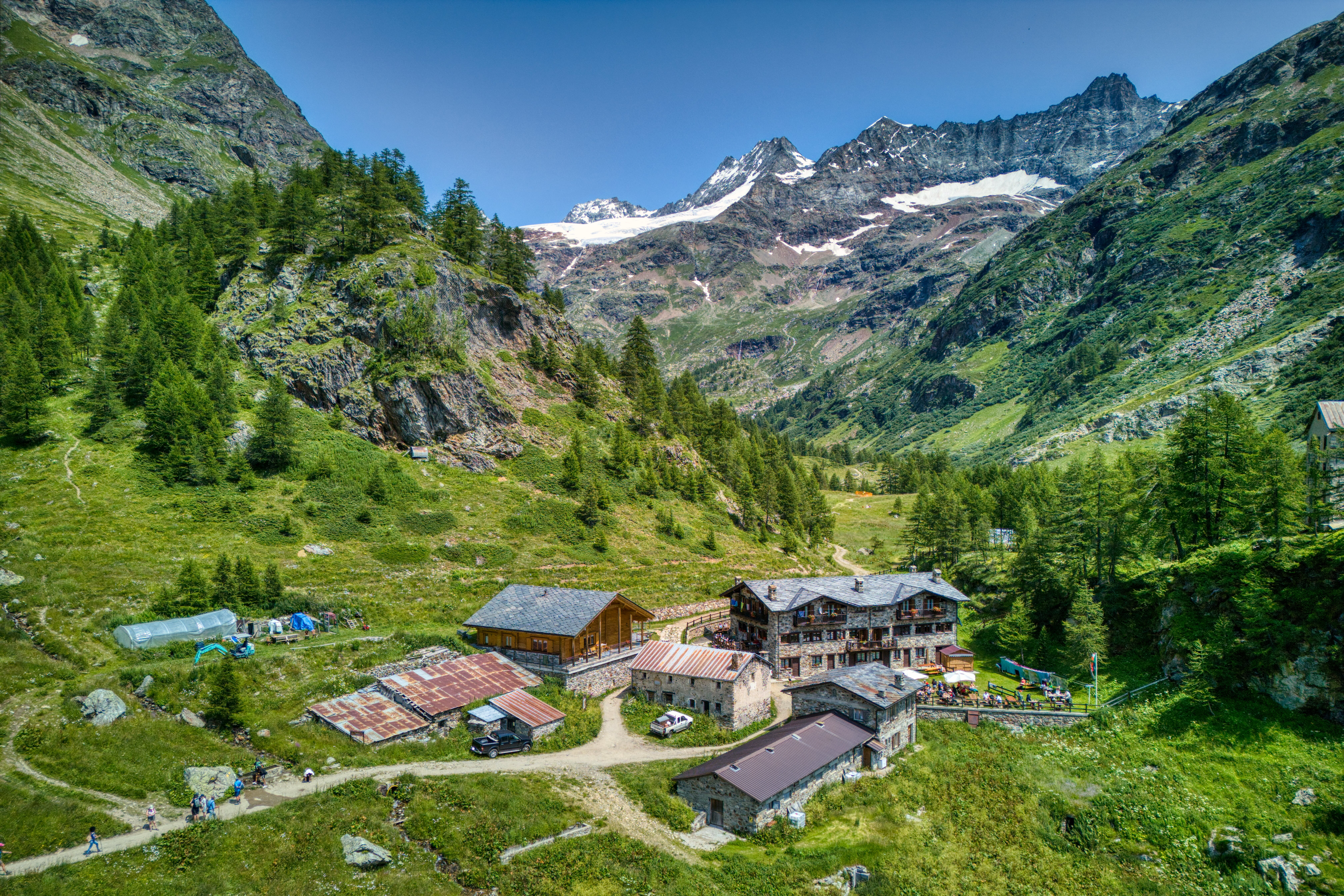
Refuge Prarayer.

Hikers are catered for by a number of mountain huts and bivouac shelters:

- Refuge Franco Chiarella à l'Amianthé (2,979 m)
- Refuge Champillon (2,835 m)
- Bivouac Nacamuli au col Collon (2,818 m)
- Refuge Aoste (2,781 m)
- Refuge Crête Sèche (2,398 m)
- Refuge Prarayer (2,005 m)
- Bivouac Perelli Cippo (3,831 m)
- Bivouac Biagio Musso (3,664 m)
- Bivouac Paoluccio (3,572 m)
- Bivouac Tête des Roeses (3,200 m)
- Bivouac de la Sassa (2,979 m)
- Bivouac Nino Recondi (2,650 m)
- Bivouac Rosazza au Savoie (2,650 m)
- Bivouac Franco Spataro (2,600 m)
- Bivouac La Lliée (2,422 m)

== Organisations ==
The Compagnie des guides du Valpelline, the association of Alpine guides for the Valdôtain (Italian) basin of Grand Combin, is based at Étroubles.

== Notable personalities ==
- abbé Joseph-Marie Henry, born in Courmayeur, the parish priest of Valpelline from 1903 to 1947 - a botanist, alpinist, historian and author of the Histoire populaire religieuse et civile de la Vallée d'Aoste
- Mario Glassier - a Valdôtain dialect poet born in 1931 in Oyace, whose works include L'etéila di bon berdzé.

== Attribution ==
This article began life as a translation of the corresponding article in the Italian language Wikipedia.
