= Ollomont =

Ollomont Alomón (Valdôtain)
- Comune
- Comune di Ollomont; Commune d'Ollomont
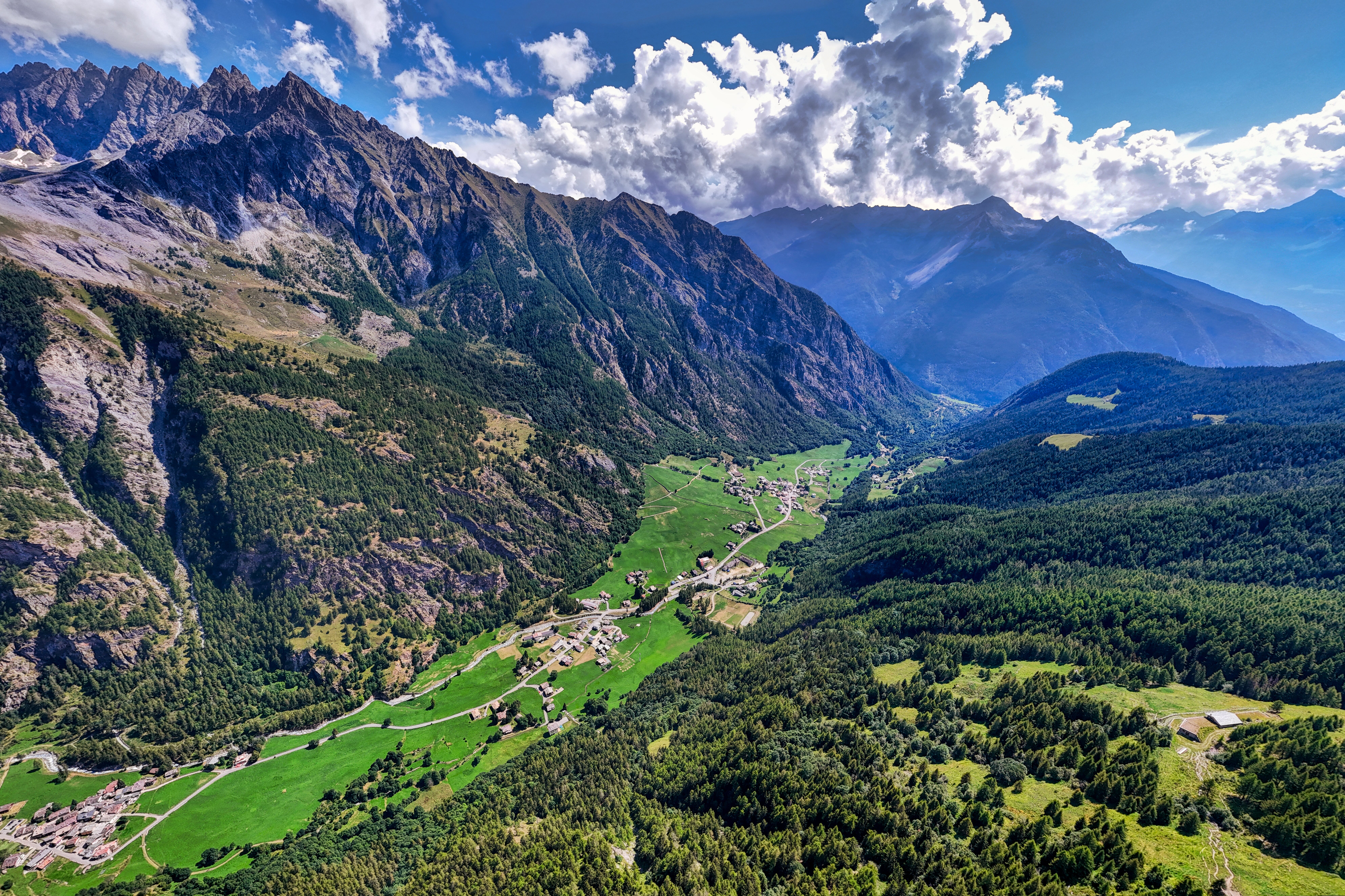

- Location within Italy Location within Aosta Valley
- Coordinates: 45°51′N 7°19′E
- Country: Italy
- Region: Aosta Valley
- Province: none
- Frazioni: Balme, Barliard, Bas, Clapey, Chef-lieu, Chanté, Chez-Collet, Cognein, Créton, Les Croux, Les Fontaines, Glassier, La Cou, Morion, Rey, Vaud, Vesey, Vevey, Vouéces-dessous, Vouéces-dessus

Government
  - Mayor: David Vevey

Area
  - Total: 53 km^{2} (20 sq mi)
- Elevation: 1,356 m (4,449 ft)

Population (31 December 2022)
  - Total: 170
  - Density: 3.2/km^{2} (8.3/sq mi)
- Time zone: UTC+1 (CET)
  - Summer (DST): UTC+2 (CEST)
- Postal code: 11010
- Dialing code: 0165
- Website: Official website

Ollomont (French: [ɔlɔmɔ̃]; Valdôtain: Alomón) is a town and comune in the Aosta Valley region of north-west Italy.

== Geography ==
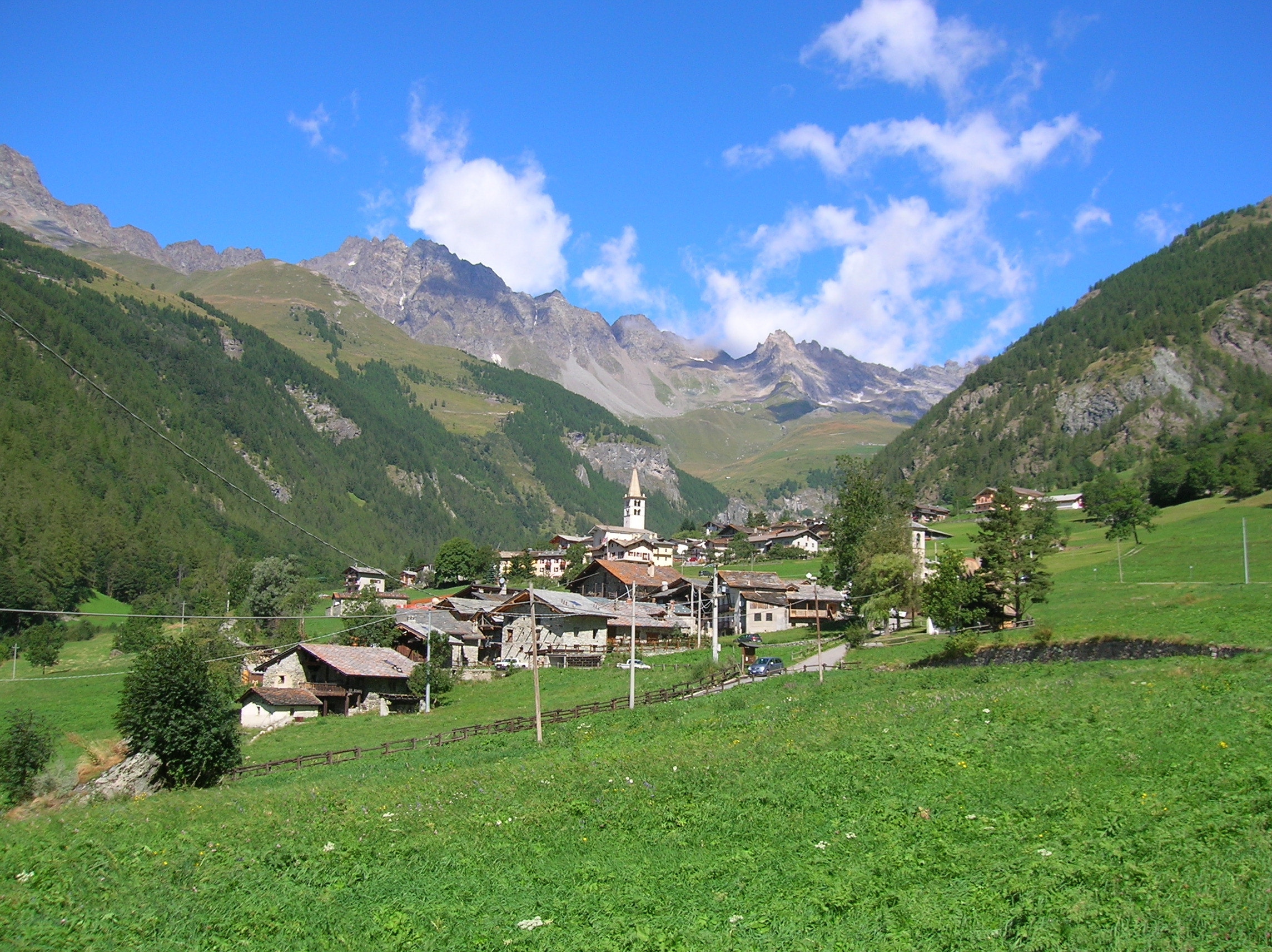
the town with the Parish Church

Bagnes, Bionaz, Bourg-Saint-Pierre, Doues, Etroubles, Oyace, Valpelline are nearby towns.
