= Valpelline =

Valpelline may refer to:

- Valpelline (valley), Aosta Valley, north-west Italy
- Valpelline, Aosta Valley, a commune located in the valley of the same name

== See also ==
- Valtelline
