= Saint-Oyen, Aosta Valley =

Saint-Oyen Sent-Oyèn (Valdôtain)
- Comune
- Comune di Saint-Oyen; Commune de Saint-Oyen
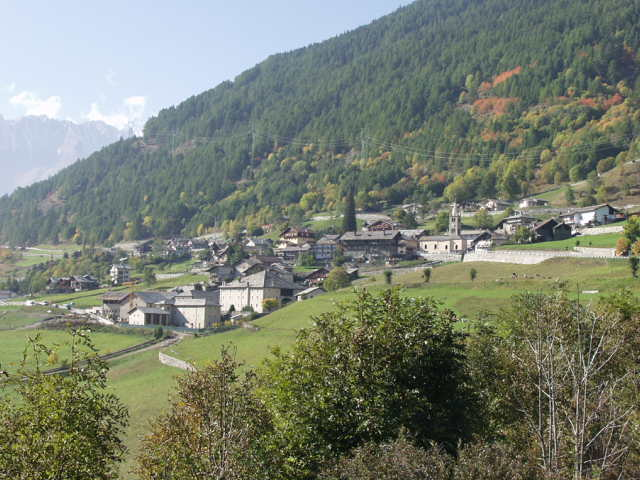

- Location within Italy Location within Aosta Valley
- Coordinates: 45°49′N 7°13′E
- Country: Italy
- Region: Aosta Valley
- Province: none
- Frazioni: Barasson, Le Blanchon, Boudier, Cerisey, Château-Verdun, La Cure, La Combaz, Condémine, Les Contin, La Côtettaz, Le Crétoux, Flassin, Les Fontaines, Les Grands-Prés, Les Grands-Champs, La Grange, Laboz, L'Église, Lillaz, Morguénaz, Les Moulins, La Noyettaz, Le Pisseur, Le Pré-du-Pont, Pré-Neuf, Reveillard, Le Champex, Le Chésollet, La Vagère, Verraz

Government
  - Mayor: Alessio Désandré

Area
  - Total: 9 km^{2} (3.5 sq mi)
- Elevation: 1,373 m (4,505 ft)

Population (31 December 2022)
  - Total: 199
  - Density: 22/km^{2} (57/sq mi)
- Demonym: Saintoyards
- Time zone: UTC+1 (CET)
  - Summer (DST): UTC+2 (CEST)
- Postal code: 11014
- Dialing code: 0165
- Website: Official website

Saint-Oyen (French: [sɛ̃.t‿wajɛ̃]; Valdôtain: Sent-Oyèn) is a village and comune in the Aosta Valley region of north-western Italy.

== Geography ==
The village is bounded by Bourg-Saint-Pierre (Switzerland), Étroubles, Gignod and Saint-Rhémy-en-Bosses.

== Twin towns ==
- Saint-Oyens
- Saint-Oyen
- Montbellet, for the hamlet of Saint-Oyen
