= Bionaz =

Bionaz Bioun-a (Valdôtain)
- Comune
- Comune di Bionaz; Commune de Bionaz
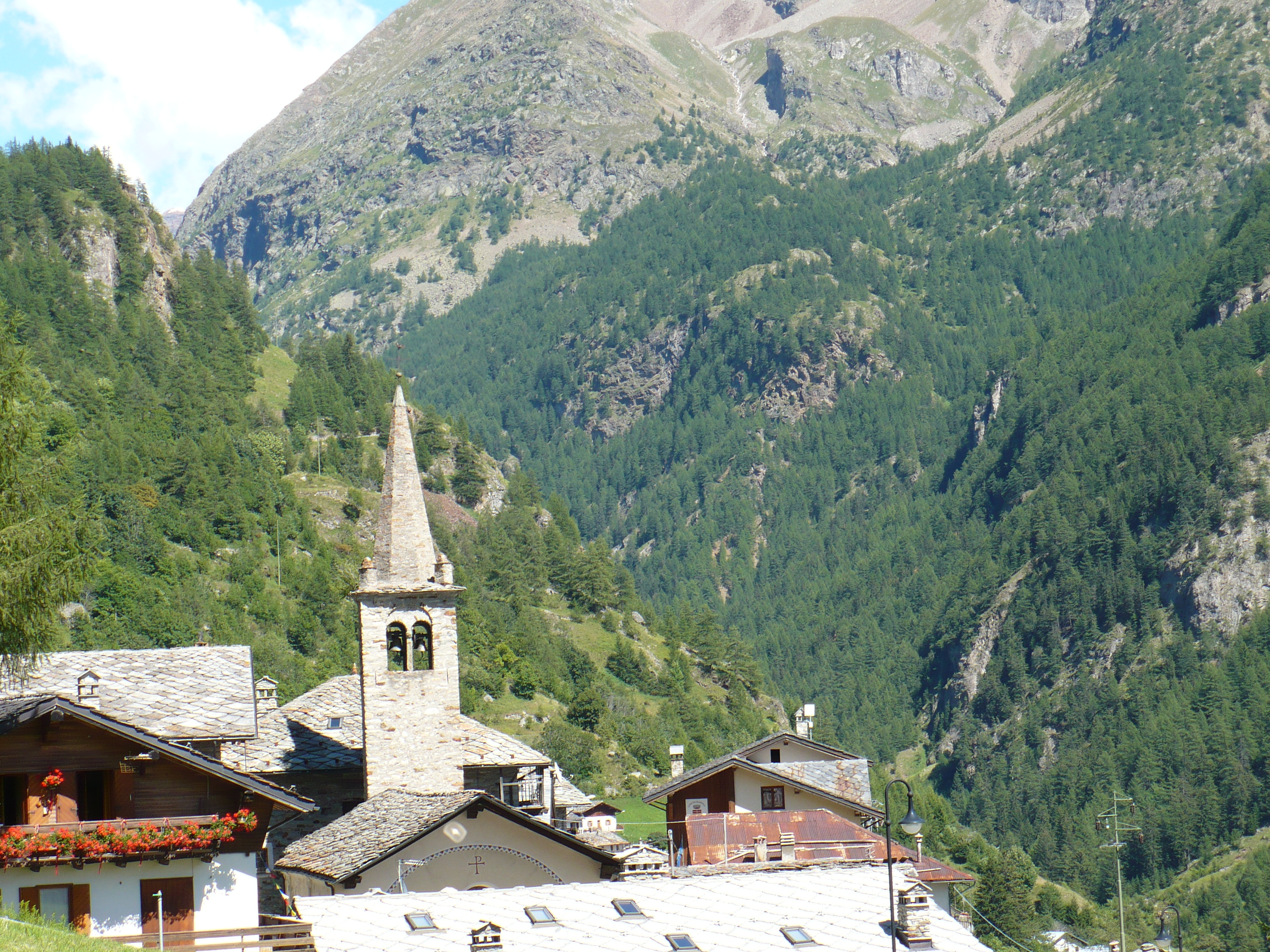

- Coat of arms

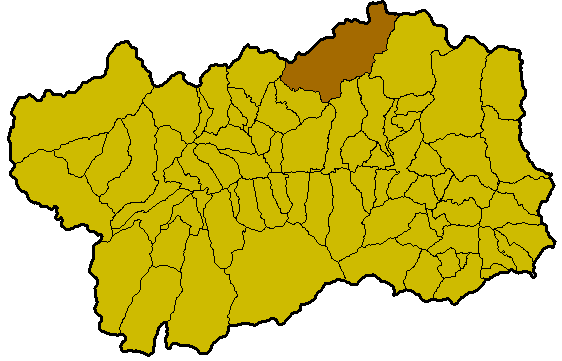
- Location of the commune within the Aosta Valley region

- Location within Italy Location within Aosta Valley
- Coordinates: 45°52′N 7°25′E
- Country: Italy
- Region: Aosta Valley
- Province: none
- Frazioni: See Villages, hamlets and other centres

Government
  - Mayor: Armando Chentre (elected 2005-05-09)

Area
  - Total: 142.82 km^{2} (55.14 sq mi)
- Elevation: 1,606 m (5,269 ft)

Population (31 December 2023)
  - Total: 221
  - Density: 1.55/km^{2} (4.01/sq mi)
- Demonym: Bionassins
- Time zone: UTC+1 (CET)
  - Summer (DST): UTC+2 (CEST)
- Postal code: 11010
- Dialing code: 0165
- Patron saint: Saint Margaret
- Saint day: 20 July
- Website: Official website

Bionaz (French: [bjɔna]; Valdôtain: Bioun-a; Biona from 1939 to 1946) is a comune sparso which extends over 143 square kilometres (55 mi^{2}) of the North-Eastern Valpelline area of the Aosta Valley region of northwest Italy. The population of about 240 is dispersed among 20 or more small alpine villages and hamlets including Plan-de-Veyne, which is the main centre and the capoluogo (locally and officially also chef-lieu, in French). The commune belongs to the Unité des communes valdôtaines du Grand-Combin.

== Villages, hamlets and other centres ==
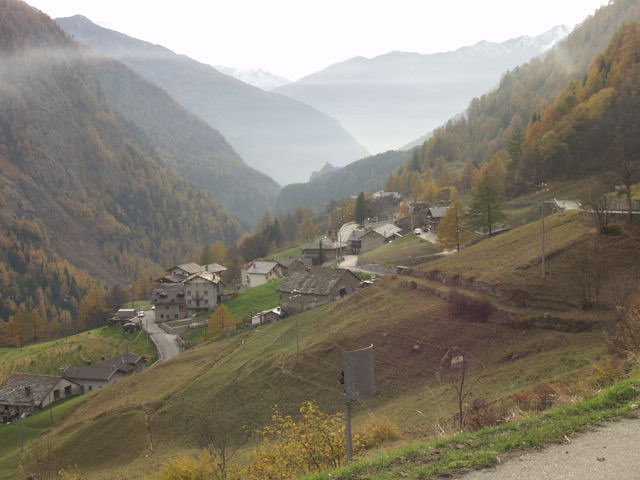
View of the Bionaz valley

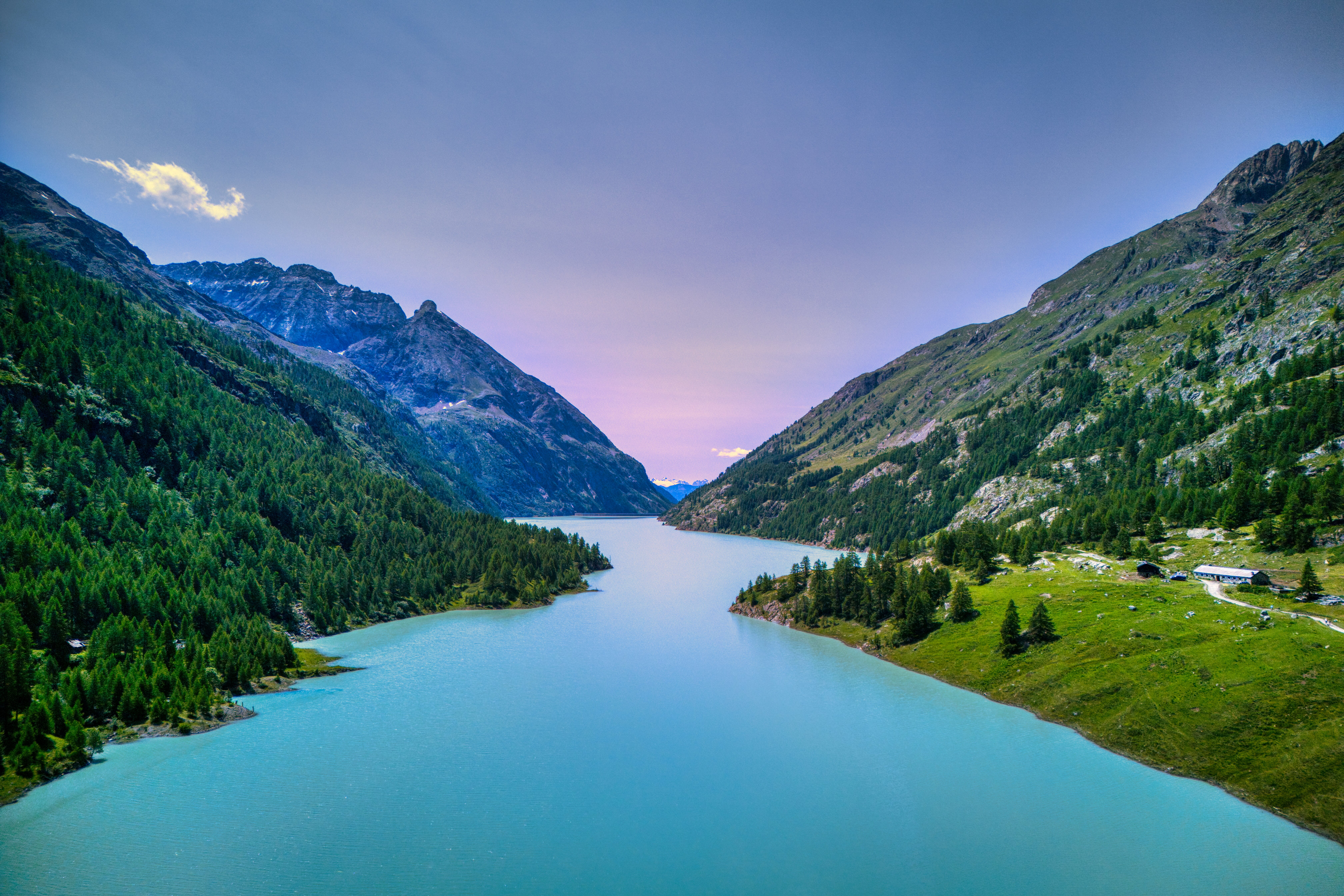
Place-Moulin Lake

The commune's statute designates the following frazioni (locally officially called hameaux, in French):

- Les Balmes
- Chentre
- Chez-Chenoux
- Chez-Noyer
- Chez-les-Merloz
- Les Crêtes
- Les Dzovennoz
- Lexert
- Les Ley
- Le Moulin
- Plan-de-Veyne
- Perquis
- Les Places
- Pouillayes
- La Quelod
- Les Rey
- Les Rus (Ru)
- Les Vagère
- Le Vianoz

The following localities, villages and other places not formally designated as hameaux, are also listed in the statute:

- Chamein
- Chez-Badin
- Le Clos-Neuf
- La Ferrère
- La Léchère
- Prarayer
- Propéraz

== Mountain huts ==
Within the boundaries of the commune, there are also three mountain huts:

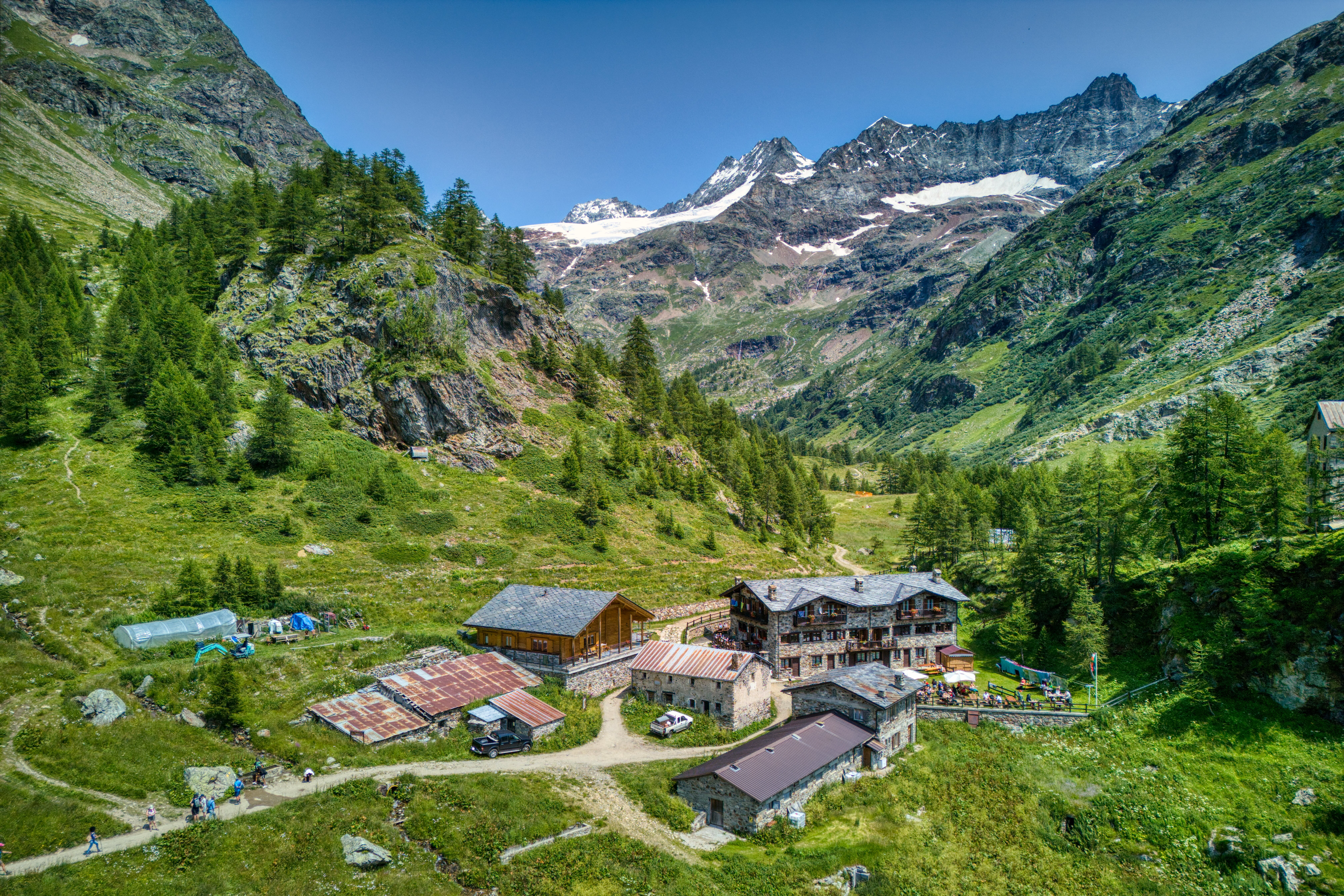
Refuge Prarayer

- Refuge Crête Sèche
- Refuge Prarayer
- Refuge Aoste
- Refuge Nacamuli au col Collon
