= Becca di Luseney =

Italian Pennine Alps mountain

- Pic de Luseney
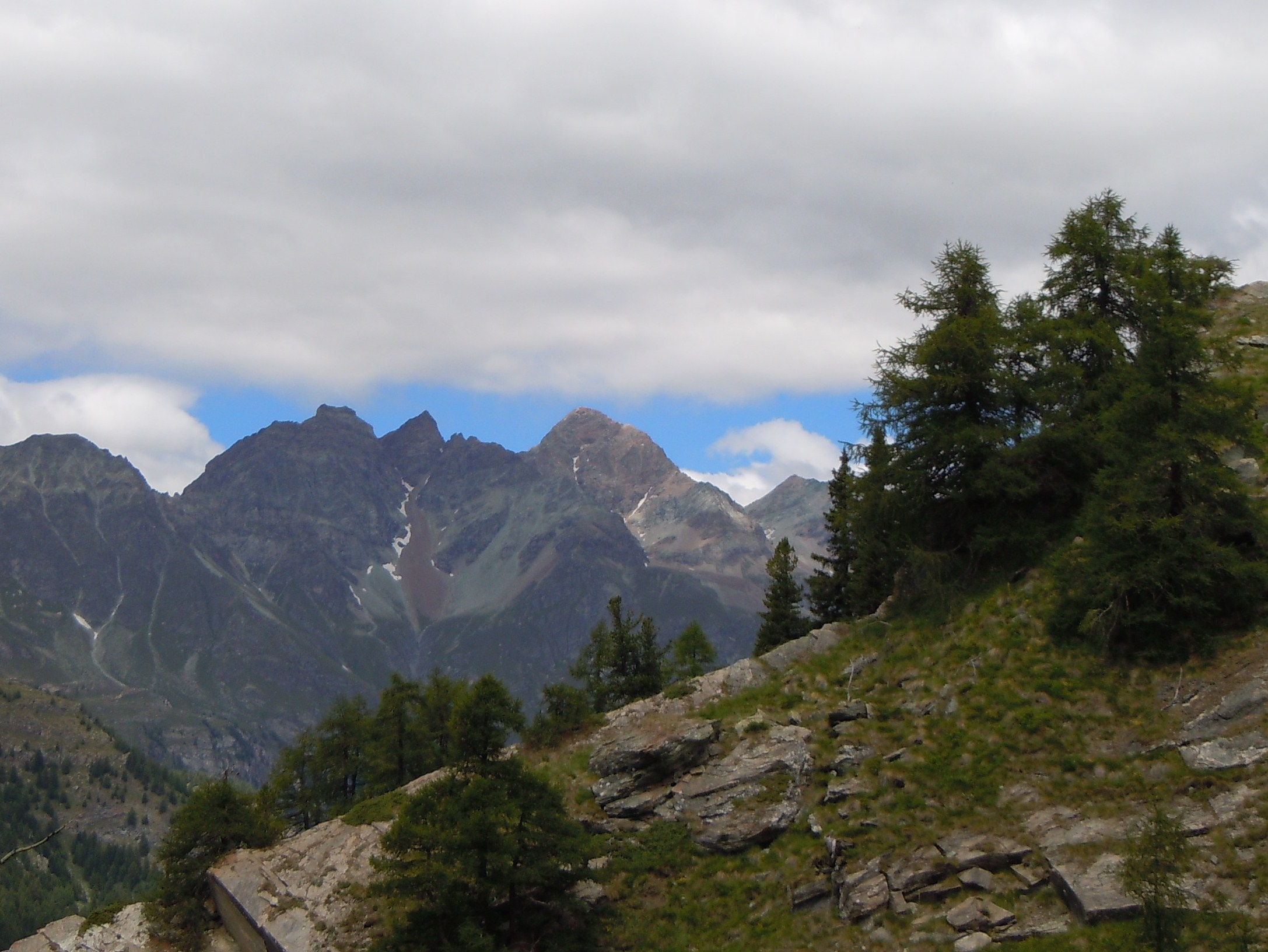
- The Becca di Luseney summit (third mountain from left)

Highest point
- Elevation: 3,504 m (11,496 ft)
- Prominence: 646 m (2,119 ft)
- Isolation: 7.24 km (4.50 mi)
- Listing: Alpine mountains above 3000 m
- Coordinates: 45°52′13″N 7°29′27″E

Geography
- Location within Alps
- Location: Aosta Valley, Italy
- Parent range: Pennine Alps

Climbing
- First ascent: 1866

Becca di Luseney (French: Pic de Luseney) (3,502m) is a mountain of the Pennine Alps in Aosta Valley, northwest Italy. It has a pyramidal look on all four sides, and its north face is covered with a glacier. A huge rockfall from its southwest face came down in 1952, completely destroying the village of Chamen and other settlements in the Valpelline valley. The mountain was first climbed in 1866.
