= Refuge Aoste =

Mountain hut in the Italian Alps

Refuge Aosta
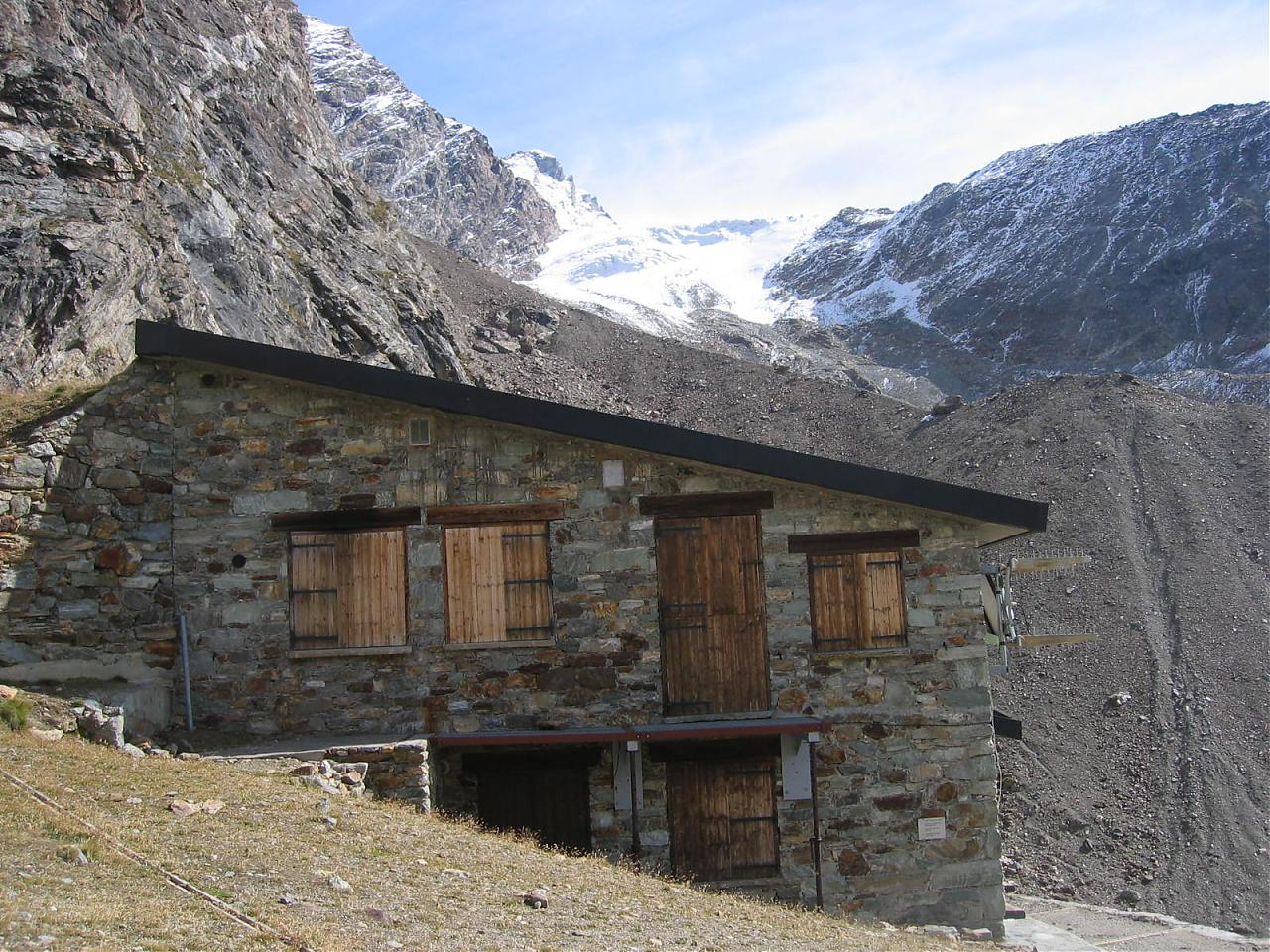
- The hut in September 2008.
- Interactive map of the Refuge Aosta area

General information
- Coordinates: 45.9667°N 7.5625°E
- Elevation: 2,788 m (9,147 ft)

Refuge Aoste is a mountain hut in the Valpelline, in the Pennine Alps, owned by the Club Alpino Italiano. It is in the commune of Bionaz, Aosta Valley, Italy.

== History ==
The first refuge was built in 1908, but destroyed by an avalanche in 1951. It was rebuilt and inaugurated in 1956, but in 1990 lost its roof. The current hut opened in 1995.

== External links ==
- Official website
