= Allein =

Allein Alèn (Valdôtain) Allèn (Arpitan)
- Comune
- Comune di Allein; Commune d'Allein
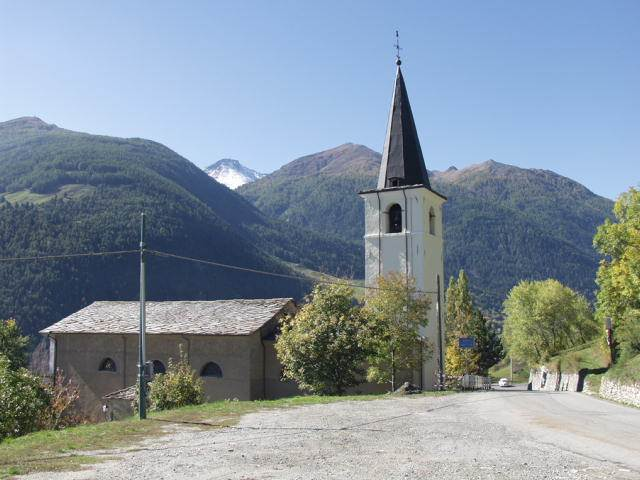
- Saint Stephen Church

- Coat of arms

- Location within Italy Location within Aosta Valley
- Coordinates: 45°48′30″N 7°16′21″E
- Country: Italy
- Region: Aosta Valley
- Province: none
- Frazioni: Ayez, Allamanaz, Allérod, Bruson, Chanté, Chaveroulaz, Chez-Norat, Clavel, Condemine, Dayllon, Frein, Godioz, Martinet, Plan-de-Clavel (chef-lieu), Vallettaz, Ville

Area
  - Total: 8 km^{2} (3.1 sq mi)
- Elevation: 1,190 m (3,900 ft)

Population (31 December 2022)
  - Total: 207
  - Density: 26/km^{2} (67/sq mi)
- Demonym: Allençois
- Time zone: UTC+1 (CET)
  - Summer (DST): UTC+2 (CEST)
- Postal code: 11010
- Dialing code: 0165
- Patron saint: Saint Stephen
- Saint day: 26 December

Allein (French: [alɛ̃]; Arpitan: Allèn; Valdôtain: Alèn); is a town and comune in the Aosta Valley region of northwestern Italy.

== Geography ==
Position of the comune of Allein in the Aosta Valley.

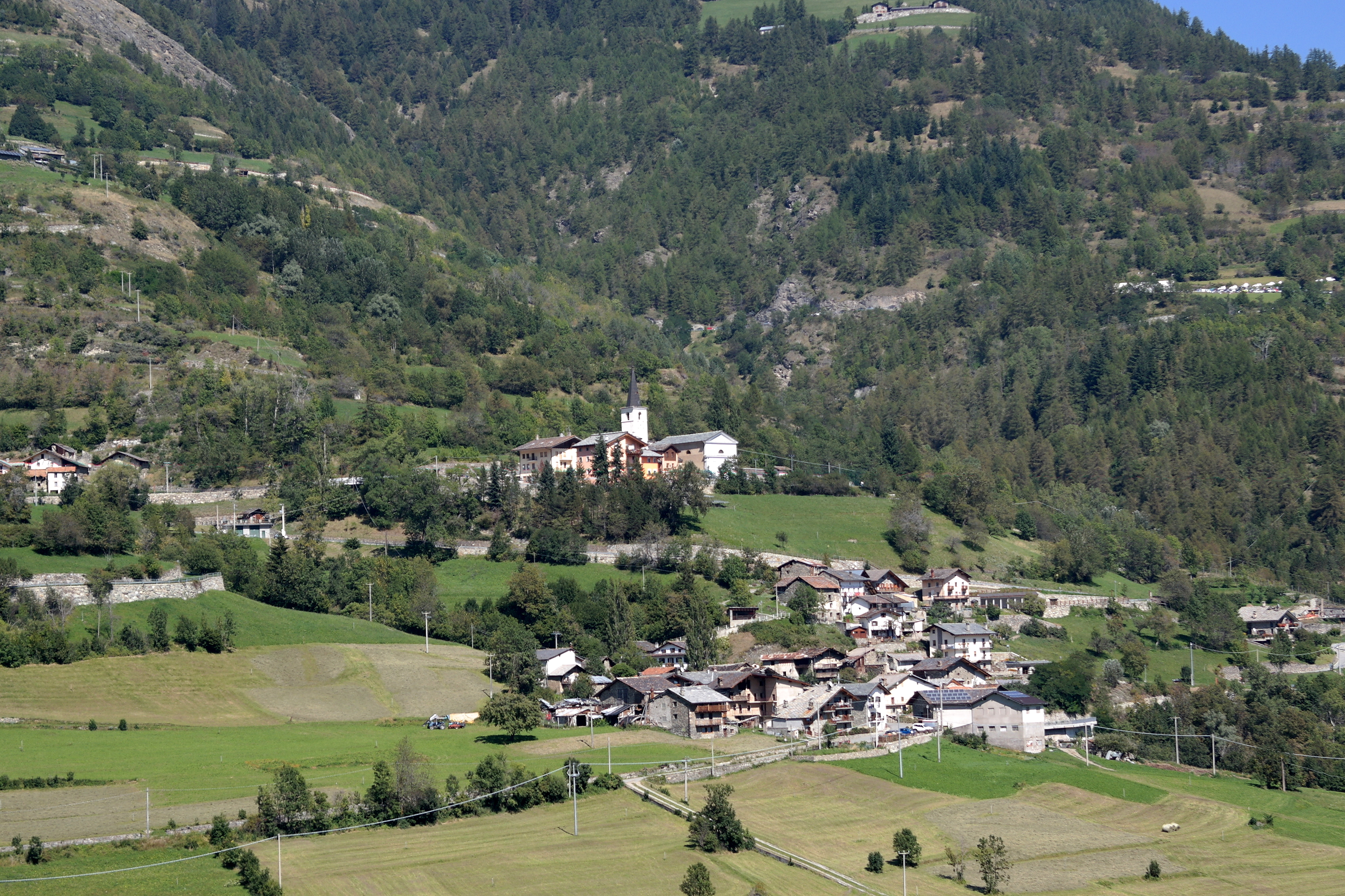
View of Allein
