= Roisan =

Town in Aosta Valley, Italy

Roisan Rèizàn (Valdôtain)
- Comune
- Comune di Roisan; Commune de Roisan
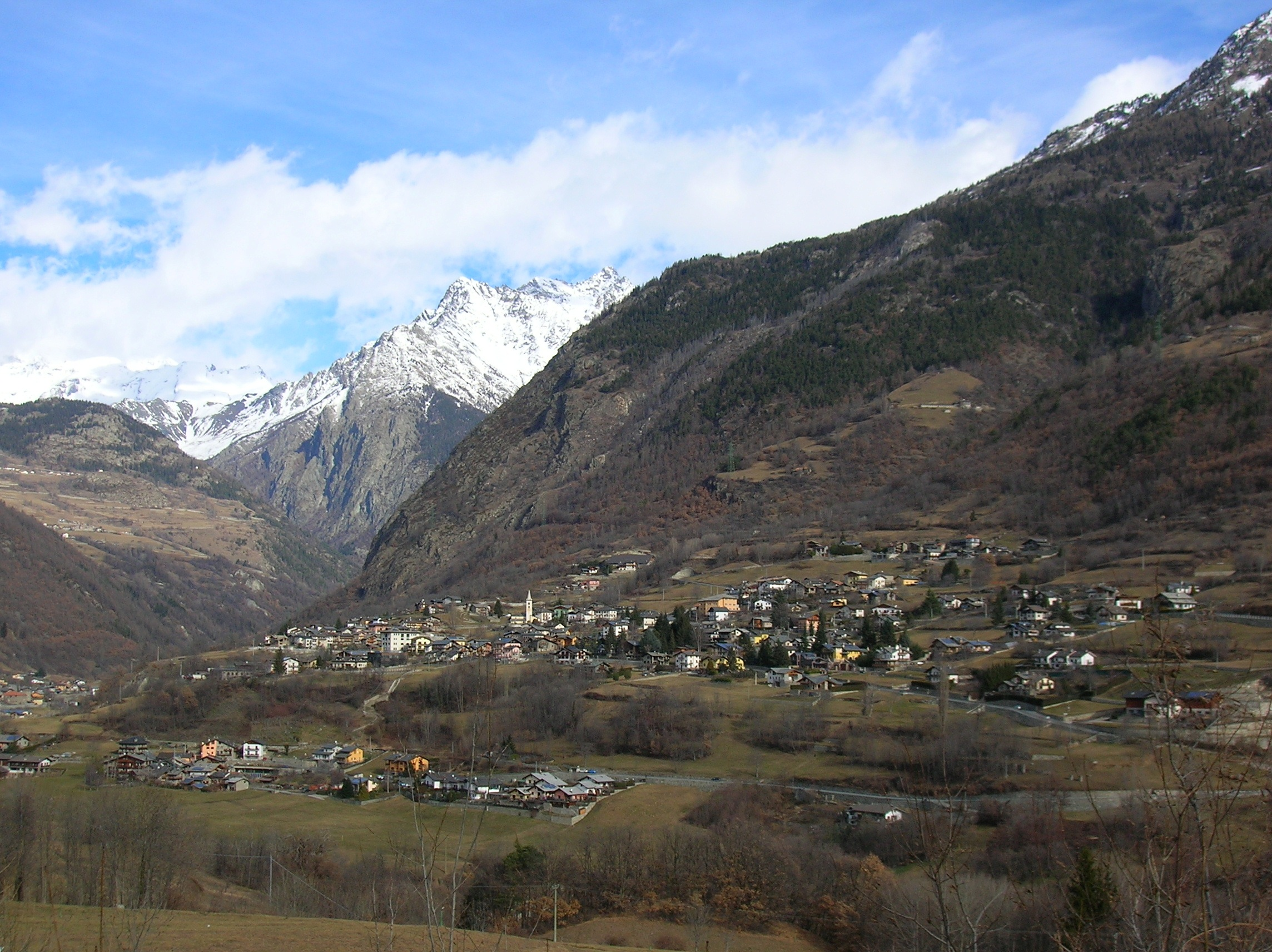

- Coat of arms

- Location within Italy Location within Aosta Valley
- Coordinates: 45°47′N 7°19′E
- Country: Italy
- Region: Aosta Valley
- Province: none
- Frazioni: Baravex, Blavy, Careybloz, Chambrette, Champapon, Champvillair Dessous, Champvillair Dessus, Chaumé, Fontillon, Clavallaz, Closellinaz, Crétaz, Gorrey, Ladret, Les Adrets, Martinet (chef-lieu), Massinod, Moulin, Preil, Rhins, Pointier, Salé, Champ de Bau, Château, Chaviller, Chez Collin, Creusévy, Zatély

Government
  - Mayor: Roisan-Stemma.png

Area
  - Total: 14 km^{2} (5.4 sq mi)
- Elevation: 866 m (2,841 ft)

Population (31 December 2022)
  - Total: 1,001
  - Density: 72/km^{2} (190/sq mi)
- Demonym: Roisaëins
- Time zone: UTC+1 (CET)
  - Summer (DST): UTC+2 (CEST)
- Postal code: 11100
- Dialing code: 0165
- ISTAT code: 7057
- Patron saint: Saint Victor de Soleure
- Saint day: 30 September
- Website: Official website

Roisan (French: [ʁwazɑ̃]; Valdôtain: Rèizàn) is a town and comune in the Aosta Valley region of north-western Italy. It is located on the left shore of the Buthier river, in the lower Valpelline.
