= Tête de Valpelline =

Mountain in Switzerland

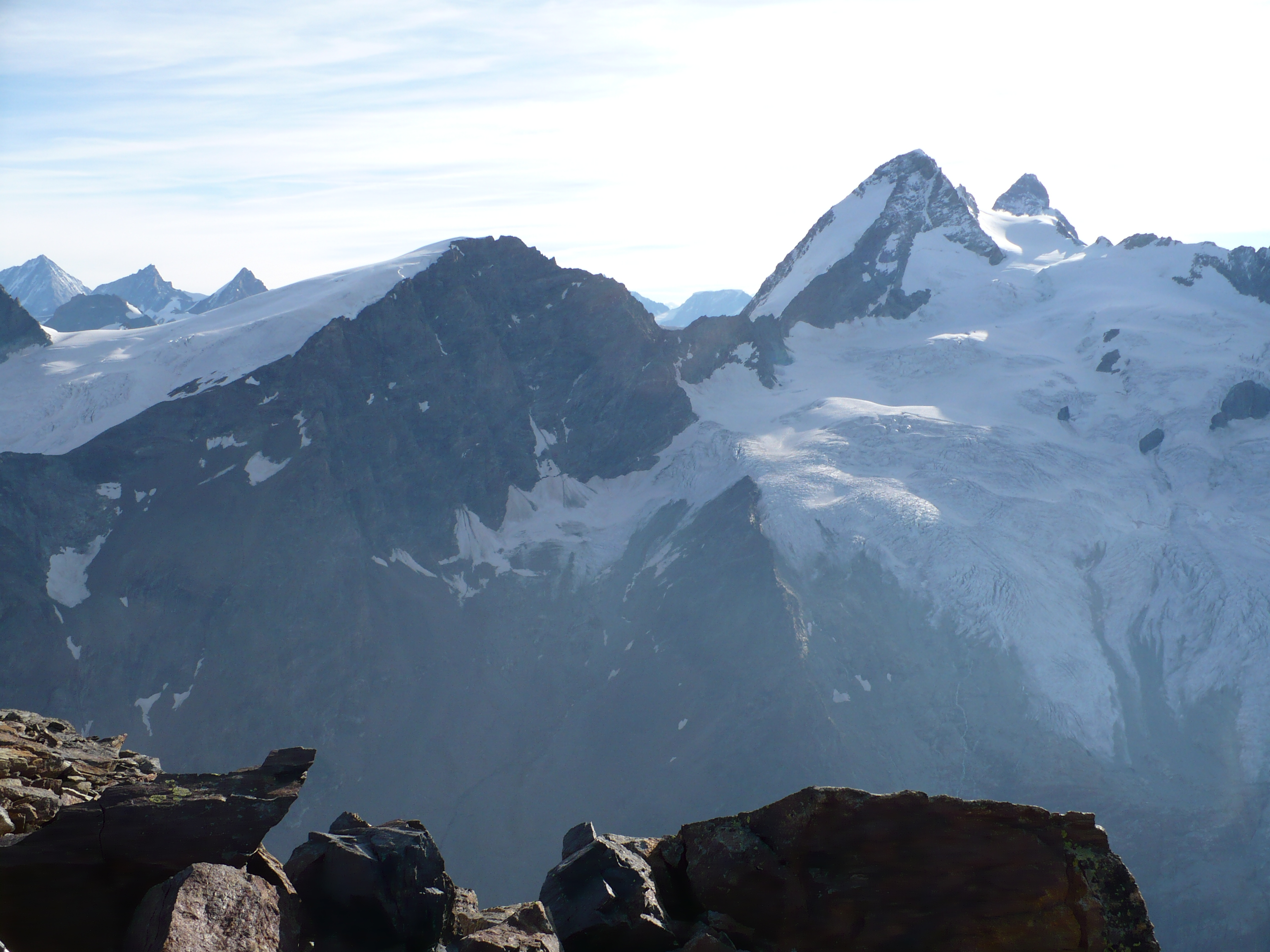
- Tête de Valpelline (left) and Dent d'Hérens (right)

Highest point
- Elevation: 3,799 m (12,464 ft)
- Prominence: 239 m (784 ft)
- Parent peak: Dent d'Hérens
- Coordinates: 45°58′31.2″N 7°34′52.1″E

Geography
- Location within Alps
- Location: Valais, Switzerland; Aosta Valley, Italy
- Parent range: Pennine Alps

Tête de Valpelline is a mountain of the Pennine Alps, located on the Swiss-Italian border. It lies west of the Dent d'Hérens, between the valleys of Mattertal (Valais) and Valpelline (Aosta Valley).
