= Avise =

Avise Oveuzo/Aveuzo (Valdôtain)
- Comune
- Comune di Avise; Commune d'Avise
- Coat of arms

- Location within Italy Location within Aosta Valley
- Coordinates: 45°42′31.32″N 7°8′25.80″E
- Country: Italy
- Region: Aosta Valley
- Province: none
- Frazioni: Vedun, Coudray, Thomasset, Cerellaz, Charbonnière, Plan, Le Pré, Le Cré, chef-lieu, Runaz, La Clusaz

Area
  - Total: 52 km^{2} (20 sq mi)
- Elevation: 775 m (2,543 ft)

Population (31 December 2022)
  - Total: 301
  - Density: 5.8/km^{2} (15/sq mi)
- Demonym(s): French: Avisiens; Valdôtain: Ovesèn
- Time zone: UTC+1 (CET)
  - Summer (DST): UTC+2 (CEST)
- Postal code: 11010
- Dialing code: 0165
- Patron saint: Saint Brice
- Saint day: 13 November
- Website: Official website

Avise (French: [aviz]; Valdôtain: Oveuzo or Aveuzo); is a town and comune in the Aosta Valley region of northwestern Italy.

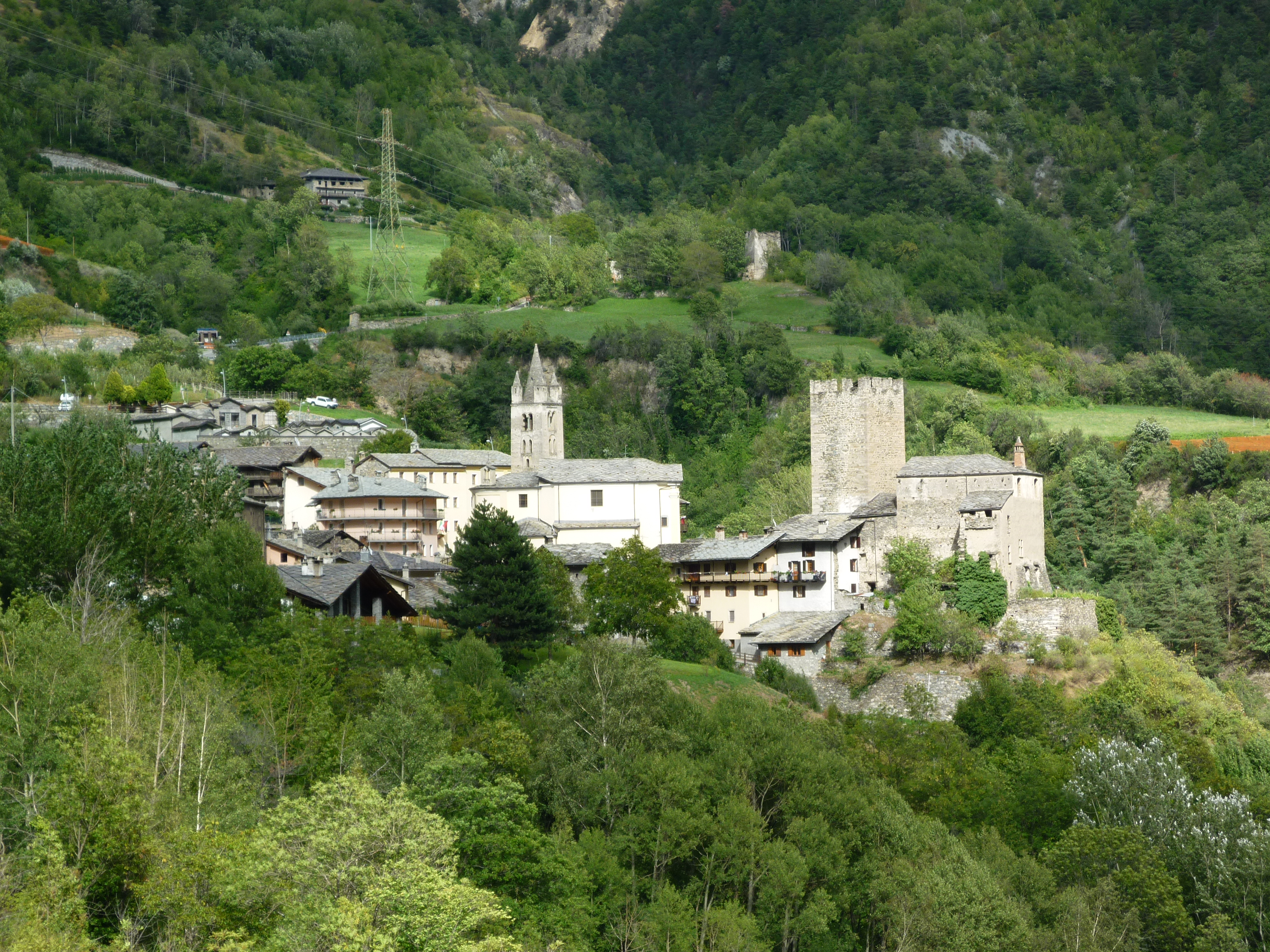
The village with Saint-Brice church (center) and one of its castles : the Blonay castle (right).
