= Brissogne =

Brissogne Brèissogne (Valdôtain)
- Comune
- Comune di Brissogne; Commune de Brissogne; Quemigna de Brèissogne
- Coat of arms

- Location within Italy Location within Aosta Valley
- Coordinates: 45°44′N 7°24′E
- Country: Italy
- Region: Aosta Valley
- Frazioni: Ayettes, Bondinaz, Bruchet, Chaney, Chésalet, Cheyssan, Chez-les-Volget, Établoz, Fassoulaz, Grand-Brissogne, Grand-Fauve, Grange, L'Île-Blonde, Les Îles, La Lovatère, Luin, Neyran, Neyran-Dessous, Neyran-Dessus, Pâcou, Pallu-Dessous, Pallu-Dessus, Pallu-du-Milieu, Passerin, Le Petit-Banc, Le Petit-Pollein, Le Pouyet, Primaz, Truchet, Vaud

Area
  - Total: 25 km^{2} (9.7 sq mi)
- Elevation: 839 m (2,753 ft)

Population (31 December 2022)
  - Total: 965
  - Density: 39/km^{2} (100/sq mi)
- Demonym: Brissogneins
- Time zone: UTC+1 (CET)
  - Summer (DST): UTC+2 (CEST)
- Postal code: 11020
- Dialing code: 0165
- Patron saint: Saint Catherine of Alexandria
- Saint day: 25 November

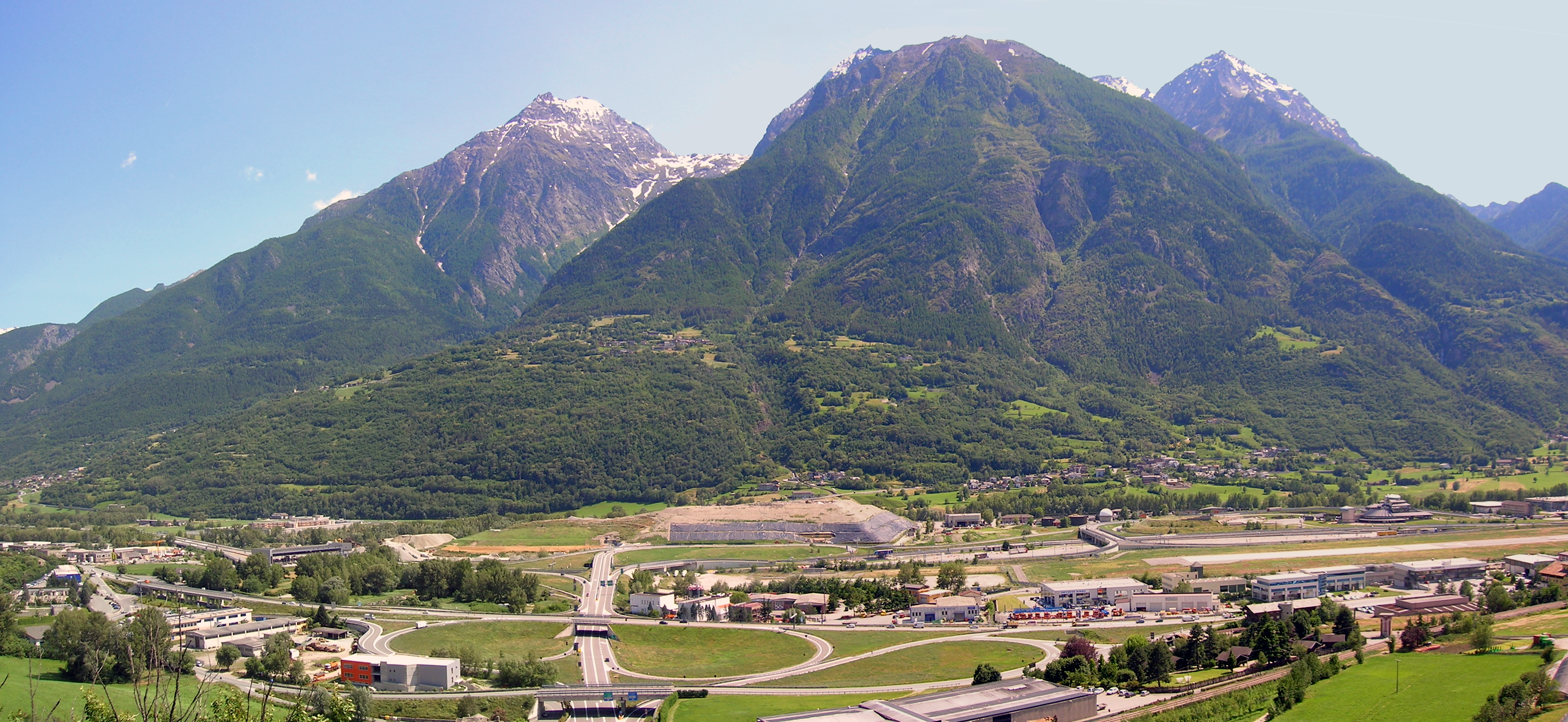
view of Brissogne

Brissogne (French: [bʁisɔɲ]; Valdôtain: Brèissogne) is a town and comune in the Aosta Valley region of northwestern Italy.
