= Jovençan =

Jovençan Dzonsàn/Dzoénsàn (Valdôtain)
- Comune
- Comune di Jovençan; Commune de Jovençan
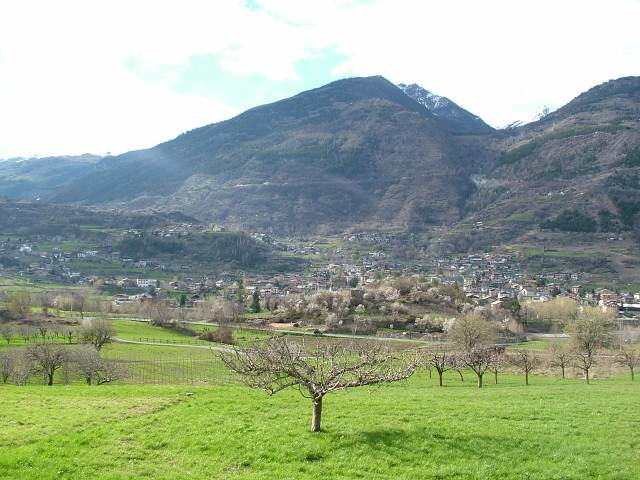
- Jovençan

- Location within Italy Location within Aosta Valley
- Coordinates: 45°43′N 7°16′E
- Country: Italy
- Region: Aosta Valley
- Province: none
- Frazioni: Bren, Champailler, La Prému, Turc, Verméneusaz, Pré Cognein, Turlin, Rollandin, Mont-Corvé, Plot de la Corne, Montrosset, Pendine, Gros Beylan, Les Adam, Jobel, Turille, Pompiod, Pingaz, Grummel dessous, La Plante, Le Clou, Pessolin, Étral, Rotin, Chandiou

Area
  - Total: 6 km^{2} (2.3 sq mi)
- Elevation: 632 m (2,073 ft)

Population (31 December 2022)
  - Total: 703
  - Density: 120/km^{2} (300/sq mi)
- Demonym: Jovençois
- Time zone: UTC+1 (CET)
  - Summer (DST): UTC+2 (CEST)
- Postal code: 11020
- Dialing code: 0165
- ISTAT code: 7038
- Patron saint: Ursus of Aosta
- Saint day: 1 February
- Website: Official website

Jovençan (French: [ʒɔvɑ̃sɑ̃]; Valdôtain: Dzonsàn or Dzoénsàn) is a town and comune in the Aosta Valley region of north-western Italy.
