= Rhêmes-Saint-Georges =

Rhêmes-Saint-Georges Sèn Dzordze de Réma (Valdôtain)
- Comune
- Comune di Rhêmes-Saint-Georges; Commune de Rhêmes-Saint-Georges
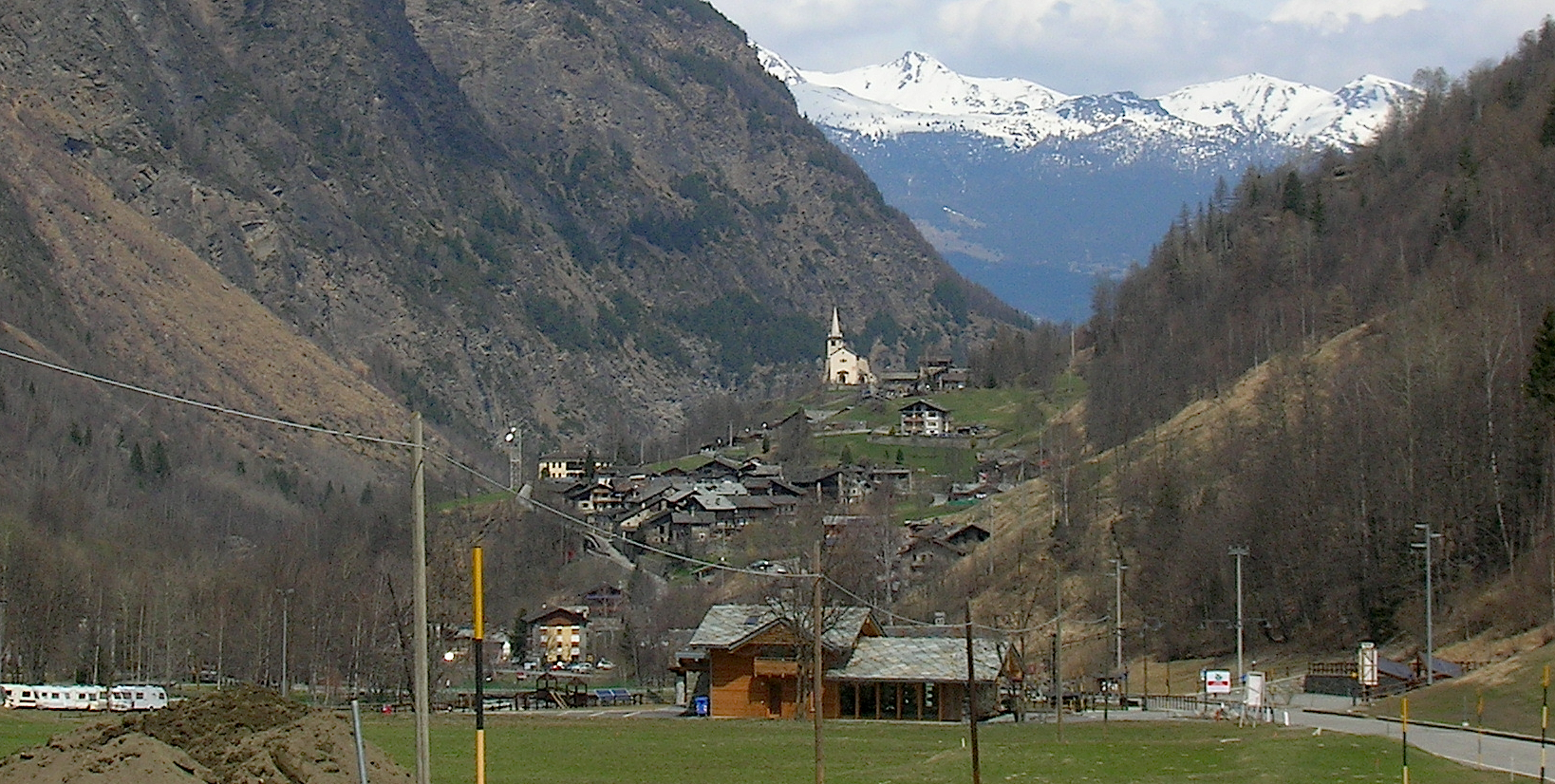
- View of Coveyrand.

- Coat of arms

- Location within Italy Location within Aosta Valley
- Coordinates: 45°39′N 7°9′E
- Country: Italy
- Region: Aosta Valley
- Province: none
- Frazioni: Chahoz, Coveyrand, Créton, Frassiney, La Fabrique, Les Cris, Les Cloux, La Barmaz, Mélignon, Mougnoz, Proussaz, Sarral, Vieux, Voix

Area
  - Total: 36 km^{2} (14 sq mi)
- Elevation: 1,218 m (3,996 ft)

Population (31 December 2022)
  - Total: 163
  - Density: 4.5/km^{2} (12/sq mi)
- Demonym: Rhêmeins or Saintgeorgeais
- Time zone: UTC+1 (CET)
  - Summer (DST): UTC+2 (CEST)
- Postal code: 11010
- Dialing code: 0165
- ISTAT code: 7056
- Patron saint: Saint George
- Saint day: 23 April
- Website: Official website

Rhêmes-Saint-Georges (French: [ʁɛm sɛ̃ ʒɔʁʒ]; Valdôtain: Sèn Dzordze de Réma) is a town and comune in the Aosta Valley region of north-western Italy.
