= Charvensod =

Charvensod Tsarvensoù (Valdôtain)
- Comune
- Comune di Charvensod; Commune de Charvensod
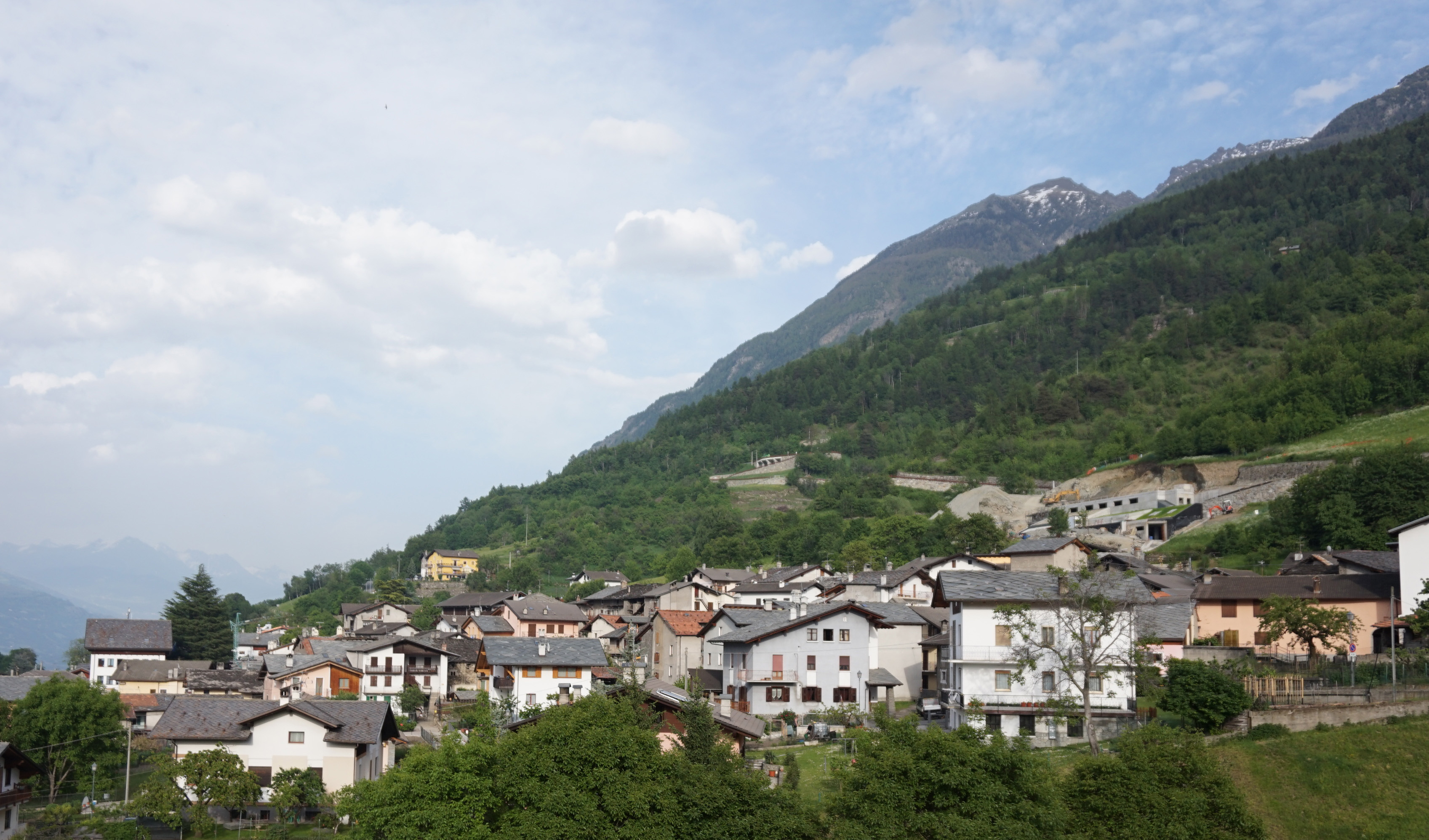

- Coat of arms

- Location within Italy Location within Aosta Valley
- Coordinates: 45°43′N 7°19′E
- Country: Italy
- Region: Aosta Valley
- Province: none
- Frazioni: Félinaz, Plan-Félinaz, Pont-Suaz, Ampaillant, Péroulaz, La Giradaz, Roulaz, Saint-Pantaléon, Chef-lieu

Government
  - Mayor: Ronny Borbey

Area
  - Total: 25 km^{2} (9.7 sq mi)
- Elevation: 749 m (2,457 ft)

Population (31 December 2022)
  - Total: 2,399
  - Density: 96/km^{2} (250/sq mi)
- Time zone: UTC+1 (CET)
  - Summer (DST): UTC+2 (CEST)
- Postal code: 11020
- Dialing code: 0165
- Patron saint: Columba of Sens
- Saint day: 31 December
- Website: Official website

Charvensod (French: [ʃaʁvɑ̃so]; Valdôtain: Tsarvensoù or Tsaensoù) is a town and comune in the Aosta Valley region of northwestern Italy.

== History ==
32 citizens of Charvensod fought in World War I, 10 of which died or went missing in action.

On 28 April 1944, three civilians from Charvensod were shot by the fascist National Republican Guard (GNR) in retaliation for a clash between partisans and the GNR on the road between Arnad and Bard on April 22.

On February 16, 1928, as part of the italianization of Aosta Valley by the fascist regime, the municipality of Charvensod ceased to exist, with its territory becoming part of Aosta. After the end of World War II, the deliberation of the Regional Council of Aosta Valley to re-establish the municipalities eliminated from 1922 to 1945 gave way to a petition signed by 424 citizens of Charvensod to re-establish the municipality of Charvensod, which was finalized on April 30, 1946. Two months later, on June 30, 5 members were elected to oversee the re-establishment of the municipality, and municipal elections were finally held in November 1946.

== Government ==
| | Mayor of Charvensod | Took office | Left office | Coalition | Election | Ref. |
|---|---|---|---|---|---|---|
| 1 | Cesare Savioz | 1 December 1946 | 8 August 1949 | Vallée d'Aoste aux Valdôtains | 1946 | |
| 2 | Damiano Borbey | 25 September 1949 | 1952 | Vallée d'Aoste aux Valdôtains | 1946 | |
| 2 | Damiano Borbey | 1952 | 1956 | Vallée d'Aoste aux Valdôtains | 1952 | |
| 3 | Germano Impérial | 1956 | 1961 | Liste valdôtaine | 1956 | |
| 3 | Germano Impérial | 1961 | 1965 | Lista 2 | 1961 | |
| 4 | Giuseppe Borbey | 1965 | 1970 | Lista 1 | 1965 | |
| 4 | Giuseppe Borbey | 1970 | 1975 | Indipendenti (Pino) | 1970 | |
| 5 | Eusebio Impérial | 1975 | 1980 | Union Valdôtaine | 1975 | |
| 6 | Leo Bianquin | 1980 | 1985 | Autonomie communale (UV DC IND) | 1980 | |
| 6 | Leo Bianquin | 1985 | 1990 | Autonomie communale (UV DC IND) | 1985 | |
| 7 | Dario Comé | 1990 | 1995 | Pour Charvensod | 1990 | |
| 7 | Dario Comé | 1995 | 1998 | Charvensod – Spazio Espace Charvensod | 1995 | |
| 8 | Renato Antonioli | 1998 | 2000 | Charvensod – Spazio Espace Charvensod | 1995 | |
| 9 | Ennio Subet | 2000 | 2005 | Pour le pays – Autonomie communale | 2000 | |
| 9 | Ennio Subet | 2005 | 2010 | Charvensod Autonomie communale | 2005 | |
| 9 | Ennio Subet | 2010 | 2015 | Noi per Charvensod | 2010 | |
| 10 | Ronny Borbey | 2015 | 2020 | Insieme per – Ensemble pour Charvensod | 2015 | |
| 10 | Ronny Borbey | 2020 | | Insieme per – Ensemble pour Charvensod | 2020 | |
