= Refuge Nacamuli au col Collon =

Coordinates: 45°56′54″N 7°30′02″E

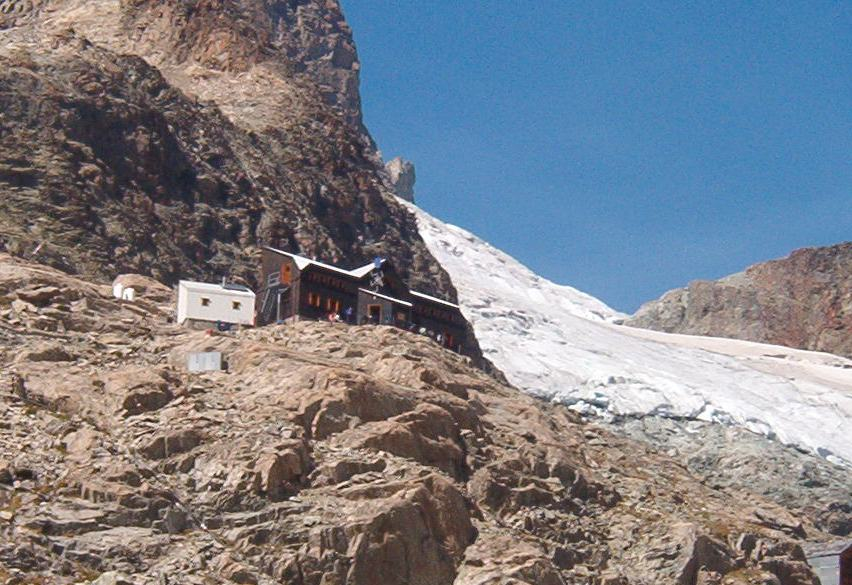
Refuge Nacamuli au Col Collon

Refuge Nacamuli au col Collon is a refuge in the Alps in Aosta Valley, Italy.
