= Gignod =

Gignod Dzegnoù (Valdôtain)
- Comune
- Comune di Gignod; Commune de Gignod
- Coat of arms

- Location within Italy Location within Aosta Valley
- Coordinates: 45°47′N 7°18′E
- Country: Italy
- Region: Aosta Valley
- Province: none
- Frazioni: Arliod, Arsanières, Buthier, La Bédégaz, Caravex, La Caou, Chambavaz, Le Champex, Champ-Long, Champ-Lorençal, Champorcher, Le Château, Le Châtelair, La Chériéty, Chez-Courtil, Chez-Henry, Chez-Percher, Chez-Roncoz, Chez-Roux, Chez-Sentin, Clémencey, La Clusaz, La Colière, La Condéminaz, Les Côtes, Cré, Les Croux, La Faverge, Les Fiou, La Forge, Le Gorrey, Lexert, Les Maisonnettes, Meylan, La Minchettaz, Mont-Joux, Le Moré, Le Moulin, Pierre-Besse, Le Petit-Quart, Le Plan-du-Château, Plan–Meylan, La Côte-du-Planet, Le Planet, La Ressaz, Rovin, Roisod, Savin, Seissinod, Tercinod, Valcartey, Variney, Véclos, Véfan, Alpe-Ronc, Ronc-Parmé, Rebiache, Peroula, Pleyère

Area
  - Total: 25 km^{2} (9.7 sq mi)
- Elevation: 988 m (3,241 ft)

Population (31 December 2022)
  - Total: 1,675
  - Density: 67/km^{2} (170/sq mi)
- Demonym: Gignoleins
- Time zone: UTC+1 (CET)
  - Summer (DST): UTC+2 (CEST)
- Postal code: 11010
- Dialing code: 0165
- Patron saint: Saint Hilary of Poitiers
- Saint day: 13 January
- Website: Official website

Gignod (French: [ʒiɲo]; Valdôtain: Dzegnoù) is a town and comune in the Aosta Valley region of north-western Italy.

== Twin towns — sister cities ==
Gignod is twinned with:

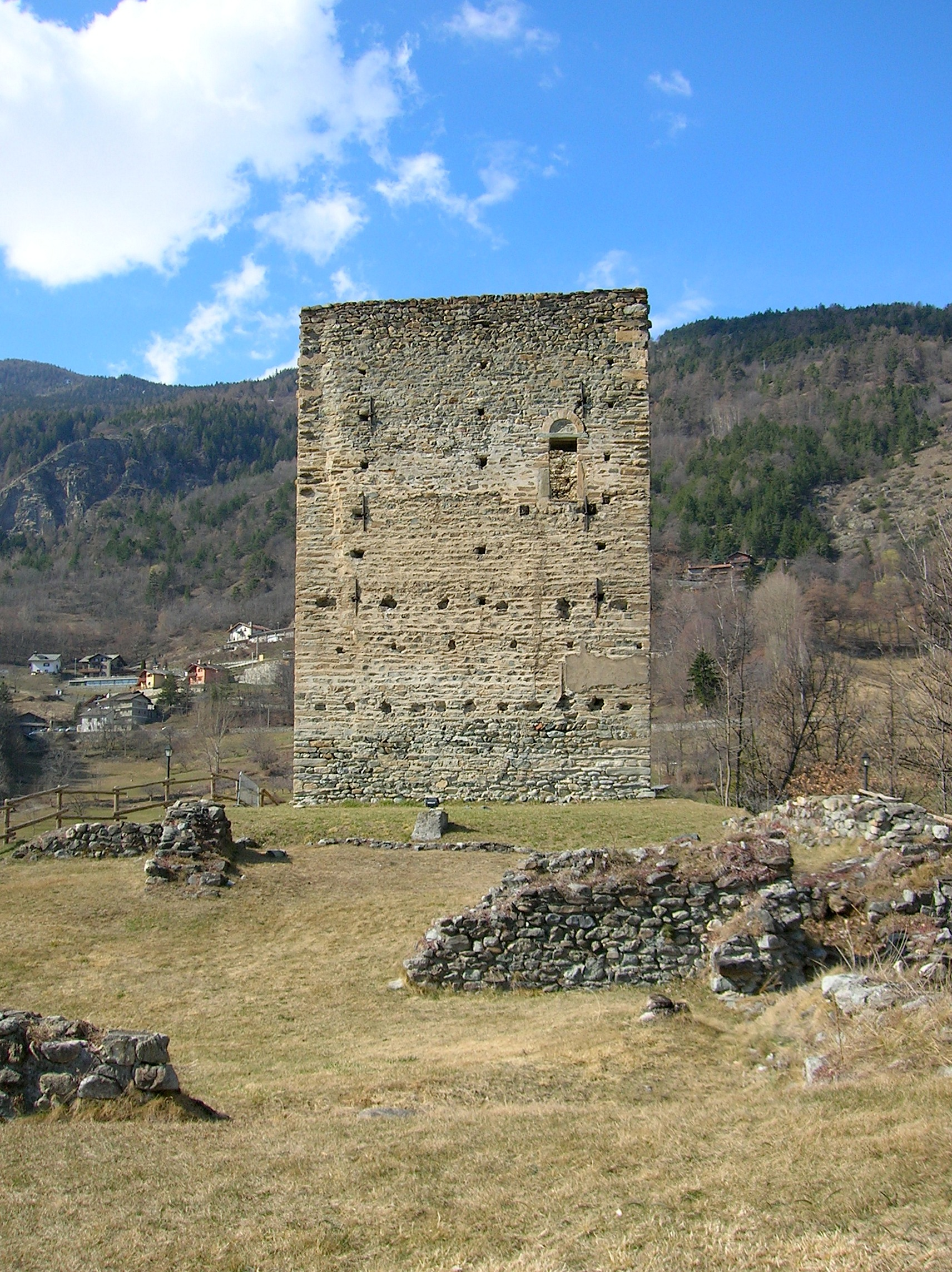
Tour de Gignod.

- Pontlevoy, France
