= Refuge Prarayer =

Refuge in the Alps in Aosta Valley, Italy

Coordinates: 45°55′16″N 7°31′59″E

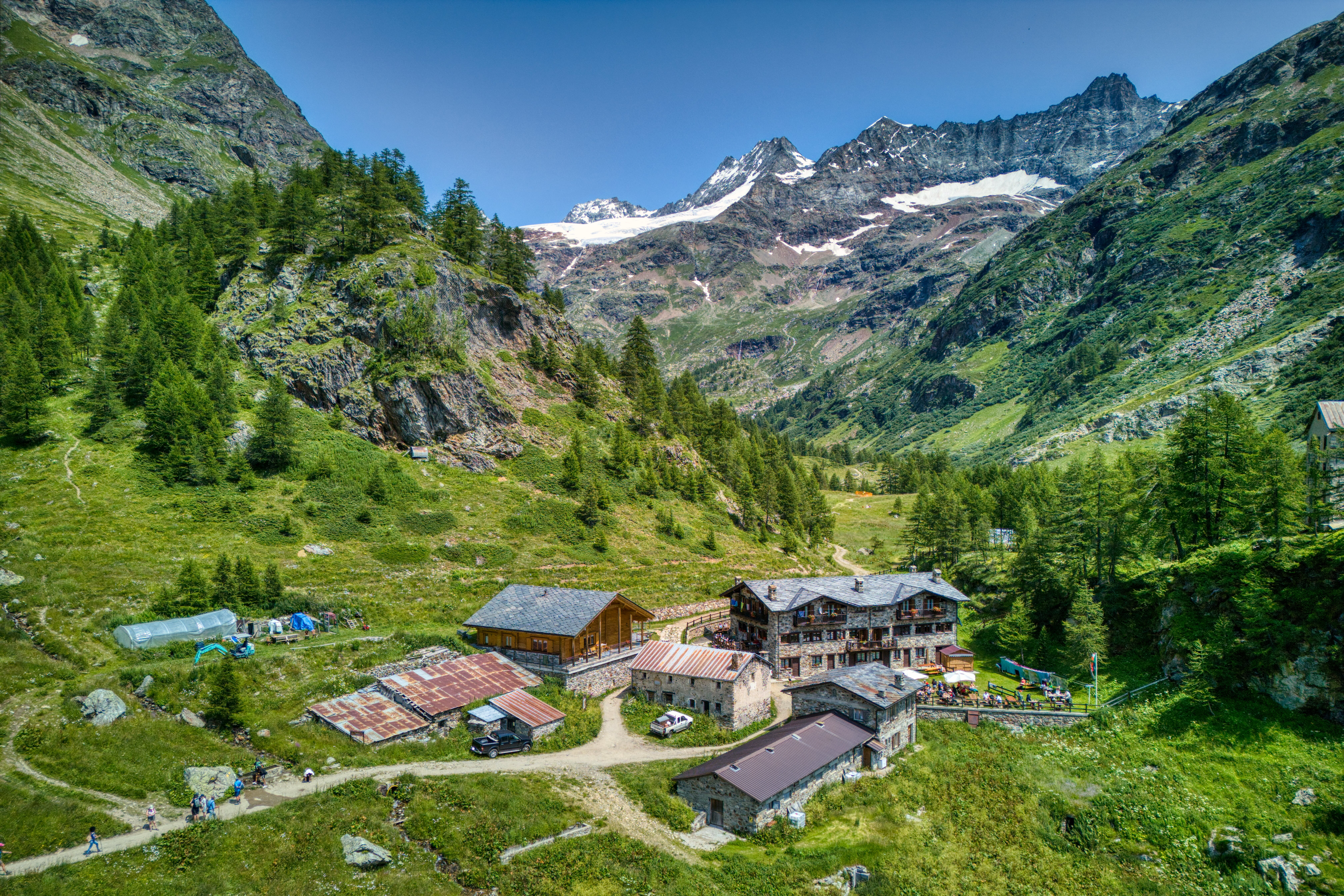
Refuge Prarayer

Refuge Prarayer is a mountain hut in the Alps in Aosta Valley, Italy, at an altitude of 2005 metres.
