= Valpelline, Aosta Valley =

Valpelline Vapeleunna (Arpitan)
- Comune
- Comune di Valpelline; Commune de Valpelline
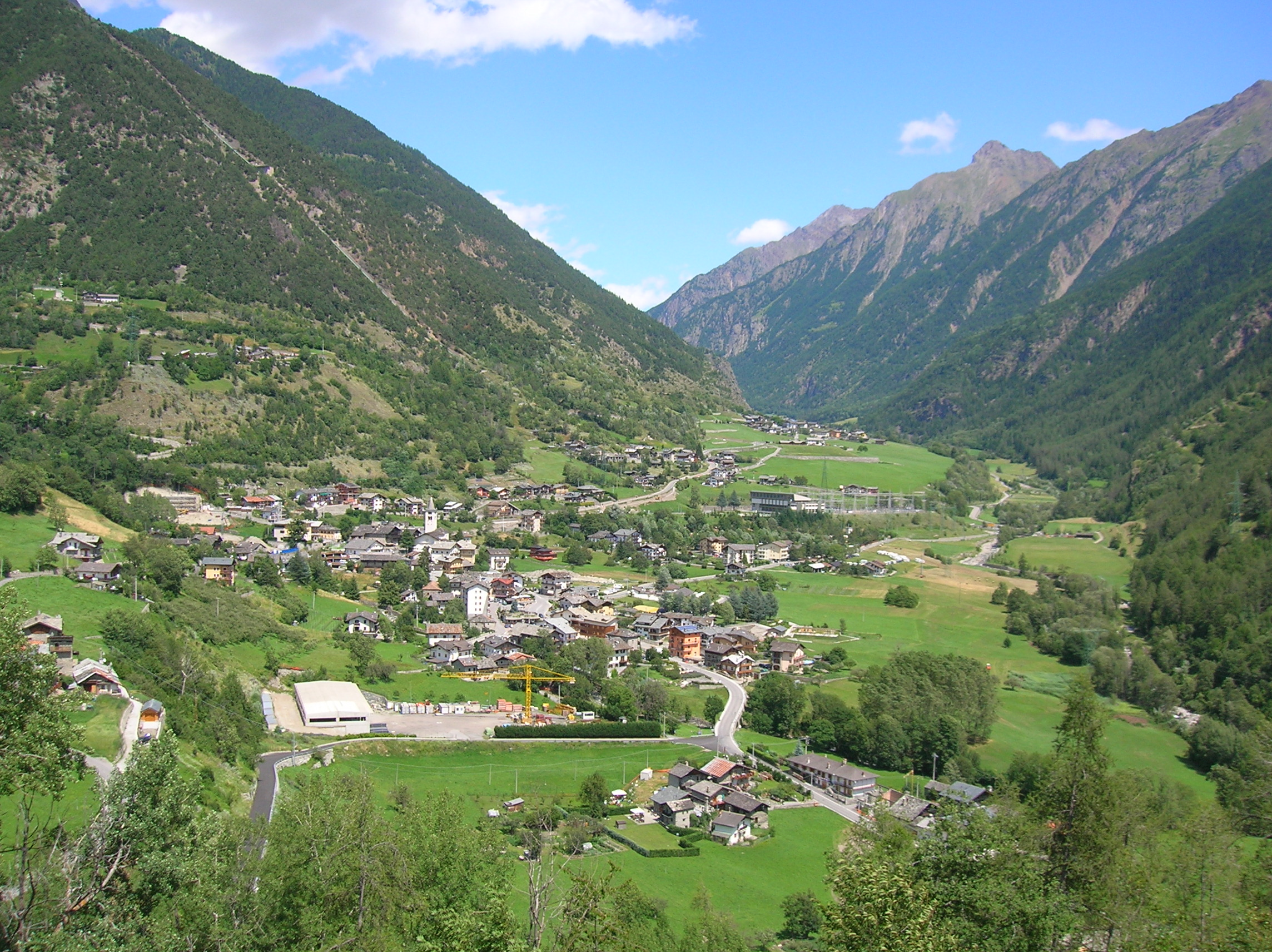

- Coat of arms

- Location within Italy Location within Aosta Valley
- Coordinates: 45°50′N 7°20′E
- Country: Italy
- Region: Aosta Valley
- Frazioni: Les Ansermin, Arliod, Le Berioz, Chez-les-Bovet, Cheillon, Chez-Cailleur, Chez-les-Chuc, Le Chosod, La Cleyvaz, Le Cumet, La Fabrique, Frissonnière-dessous, Frissonnière-dessus, La Fusinaz, La Forge, Les Gontés, Lavod, La Moulaz, Le Moulin, Plan-Coudrey, La Poste, Les Prailles, Semon, Souverou, Toules-dessous, Toules-dessus, La Ville

Area
  - Total: 31 km^{2} (12 sq mi)
- Elevation: 964 m (3,163 ft)

Population (31 December 2022)
  - Total: 595
  - Density: 19/km^{2} (50/sq mi)
- Time zone: UTC+1 (CET)
  - Summer (DST): UTC+2 (CEST)
- Postal code: 11010
- Dialing code: 0165
- Patron saint: Saint Pantaleon
- Saint day: 27 July
- Website: Official website

Valpelline (French: [valpəlin]; Valdôtain: Vapeleunna) is a town and comune (municipality) in the Aosta Valley region of north-western Italy.
