= Étroubles =

Étroubles Étroble (Valdôtain)
- Comune
- Comune di Étroubles; Commune d'Étroubles
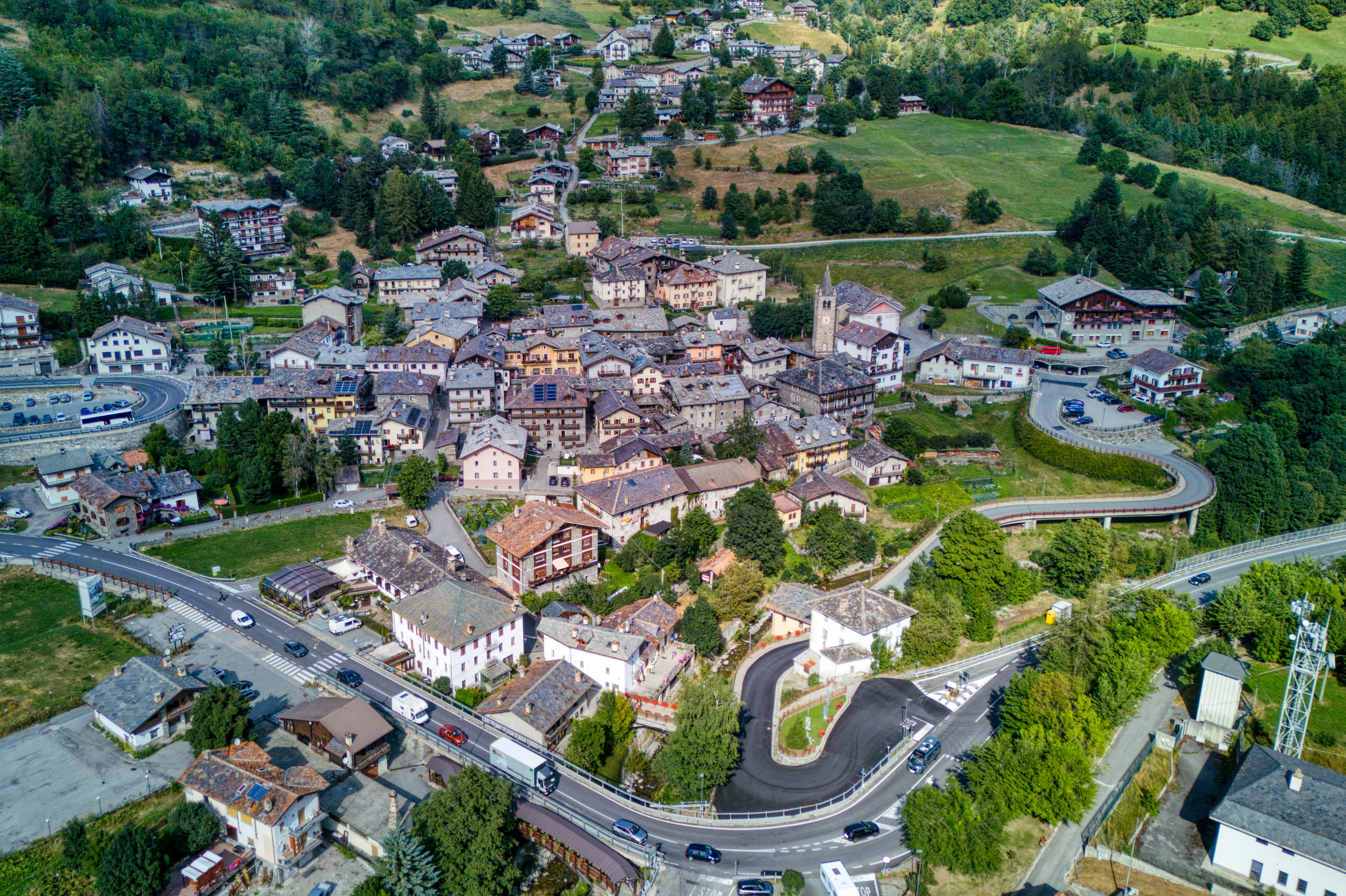
- View of Étroubles

- Coat of arms

- Location within Italy Location within Aosta Valley
- Coordinates: 45°49′N 7°13′E
- Country: Italy
- Region: Aosta Valley
- Province: none
- Frazioni: Bézet, Chez-les-Blancs, Cerisey, Échevennoz, Éternod, La Collère, Lavanche, Pallais, Prailles, Vachéry, Véyaz

Government
  - Mayor: Massimo Tamone

Area
  - Total: 39 km^{2} (15 sq mi)
- Elevation: 1,280 m (4,200 ft)

Population (31 December 2022)
  - Total: 478
  - Density: 12/km^{2} (32/sq mi)
- Demonym: Étroubleins
- Time zone: UTC+1 (CET)
  - Summer (DST): UTC+2 (CEST)
- Postal code: 11014
- Dialing code: 0165
- Website: Official website

Étroubles (French: [etʁubl]; Valdôtain: Étroble) is a comune (municipality) in the Italian region of Aosta Valley. It is one of I Borghi più belli d'Italia ("The most beautiful villages of Italy").

Sights include a bell tower from a now disappeared 15th century Romanesque church and a medieval watchtower (built in the 12th century on a Roman foundation).

== History ==
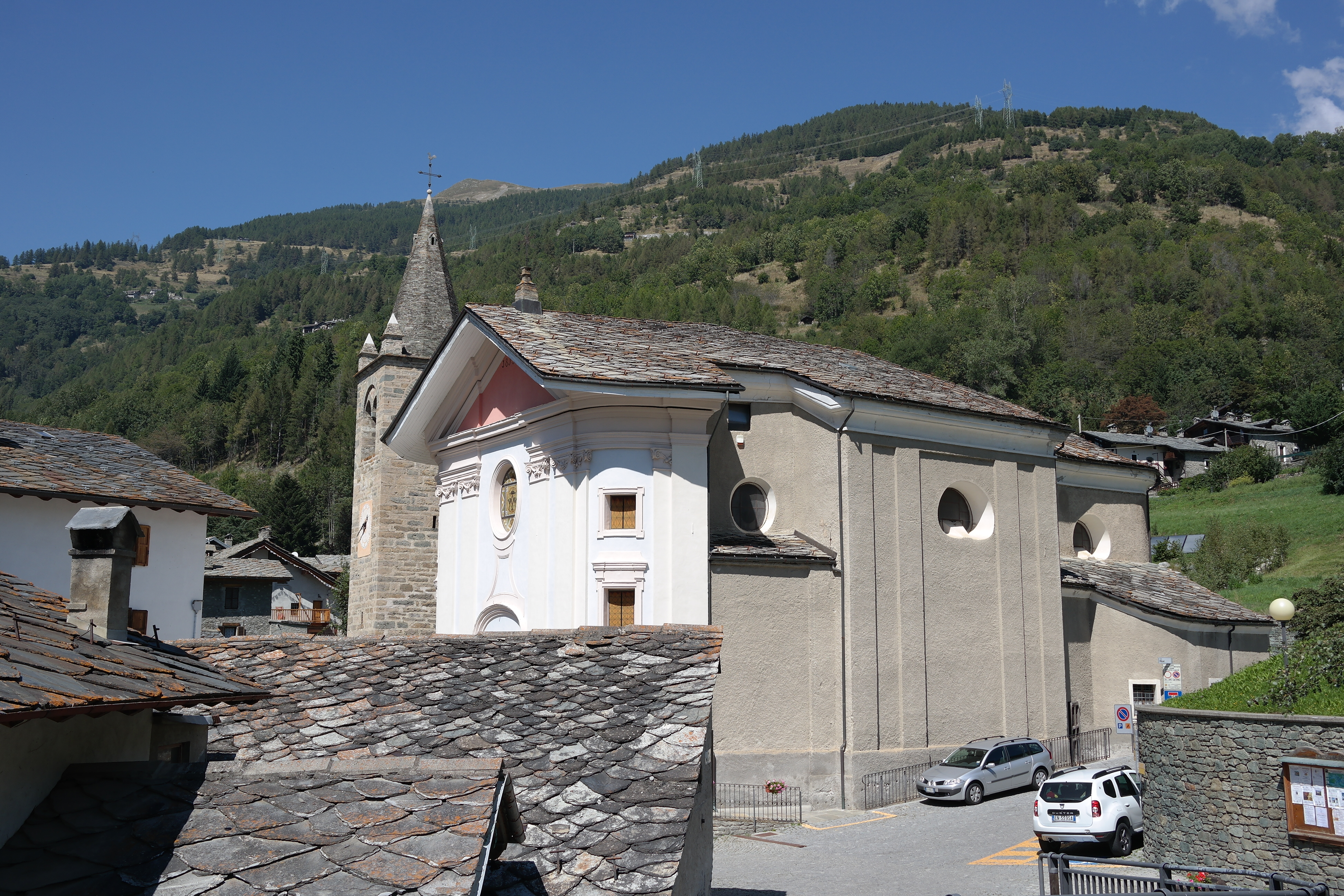
The parish church.

In Roman times, it was known as Restapolis and was the main centre in the Great St. Bernard Valley. It perhaps housed the local garrison watching the main access from Gaul. In medieval times, it was a stage on the Via Francigena.

Napoleon stayed at Étroubles on 20 May 1800, during his march to Marengo and the eponymous battle.
