= Doues =

Doues Doue (Valdôtain)
- Comune
- Comune di Doues; Commune de Doues
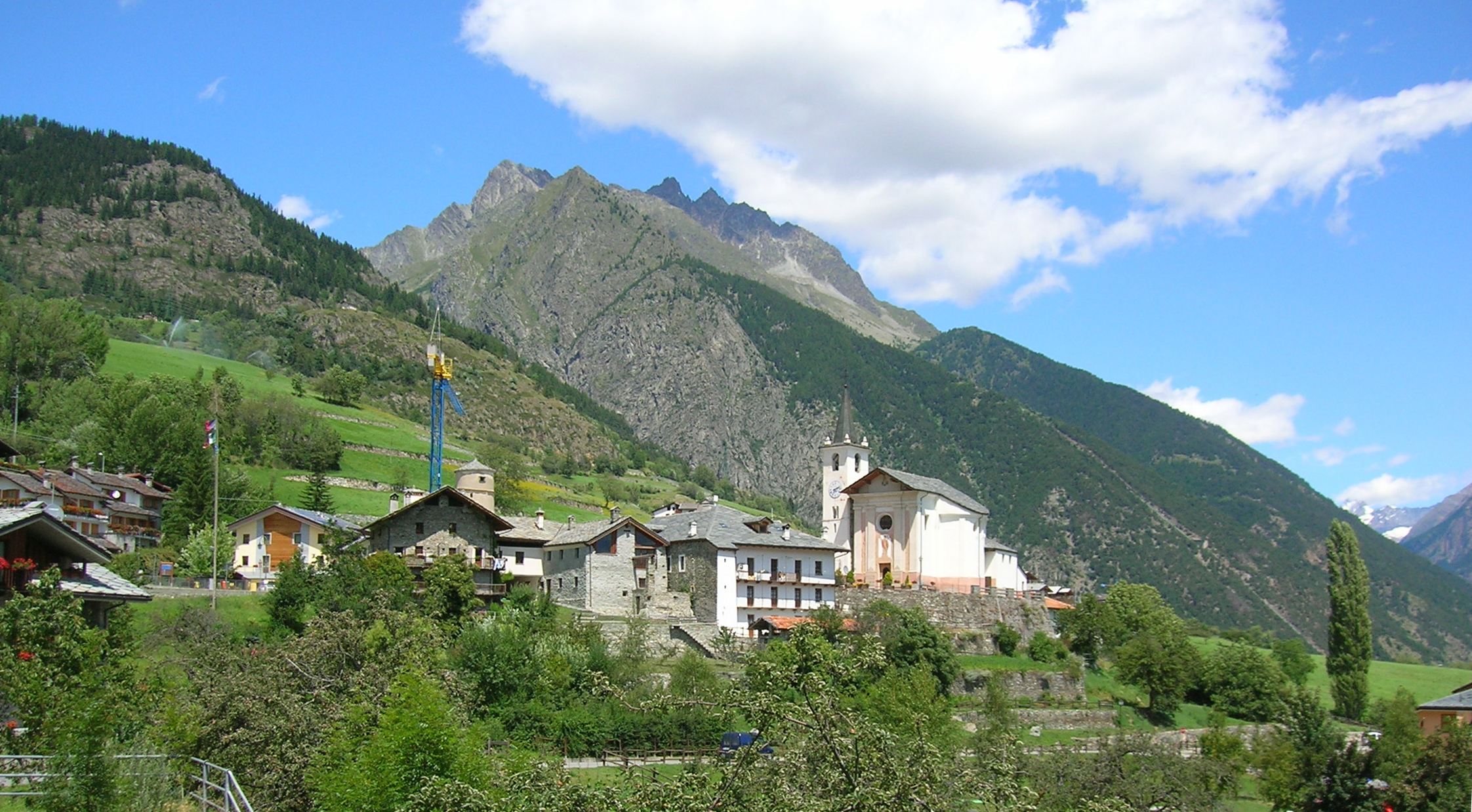

- Coat of arms

- Location within Italy Location within Aosta Valley
- Coordinates: 45°49′N 7°18′E
- Country: Italy
- Region: Aosta Valley
- Province: none
- Frazioni: Aillan, La Bioulaz, Le Bouvier, Champ-Mort, La Cerise, Le Chanet, La Chenal, Champsavinal, Châtelair, La Cleyvaz, Condémine, La Coud, Le Coudrey, Le Coudrey-Dessus, La Crétaz, Crêtes, Dialley, Le Haut-Prabas, Javiod, Le Lusey, Meylan, Orbaney, La Perrouaz, Planavillaz, Le Plan-d’Aillan, Plataz, Les Ploutres, Posseil, Prabas, Les Quelères, Le Torrent, Vers-chez-Croux

Area
  - Total: 16 km^{2} (6.2 sq mi)
- Elevation: 1,176 m (3,858 ft)

Population (31 December 2022)
  - Total: 512
  - Density: 32/km^{2} (83/sq mi)
- Demonym: Doyards or Douvains
- Time zone: UTC+1 (CET)
  - Summer (DST): UTC+2 (CEST)
- Postal code: 11010
- Dialing code: 0165
- Patron saint: Saint Blaise
- Saint day: 3 February

Doues (French: [duə]; Valdôtain: Doue) is a town and comune in the Aosta Valley region of north-western Italy.
