= Oyace =

- Comune
- Comune di Oyace; Commune d'Oyace
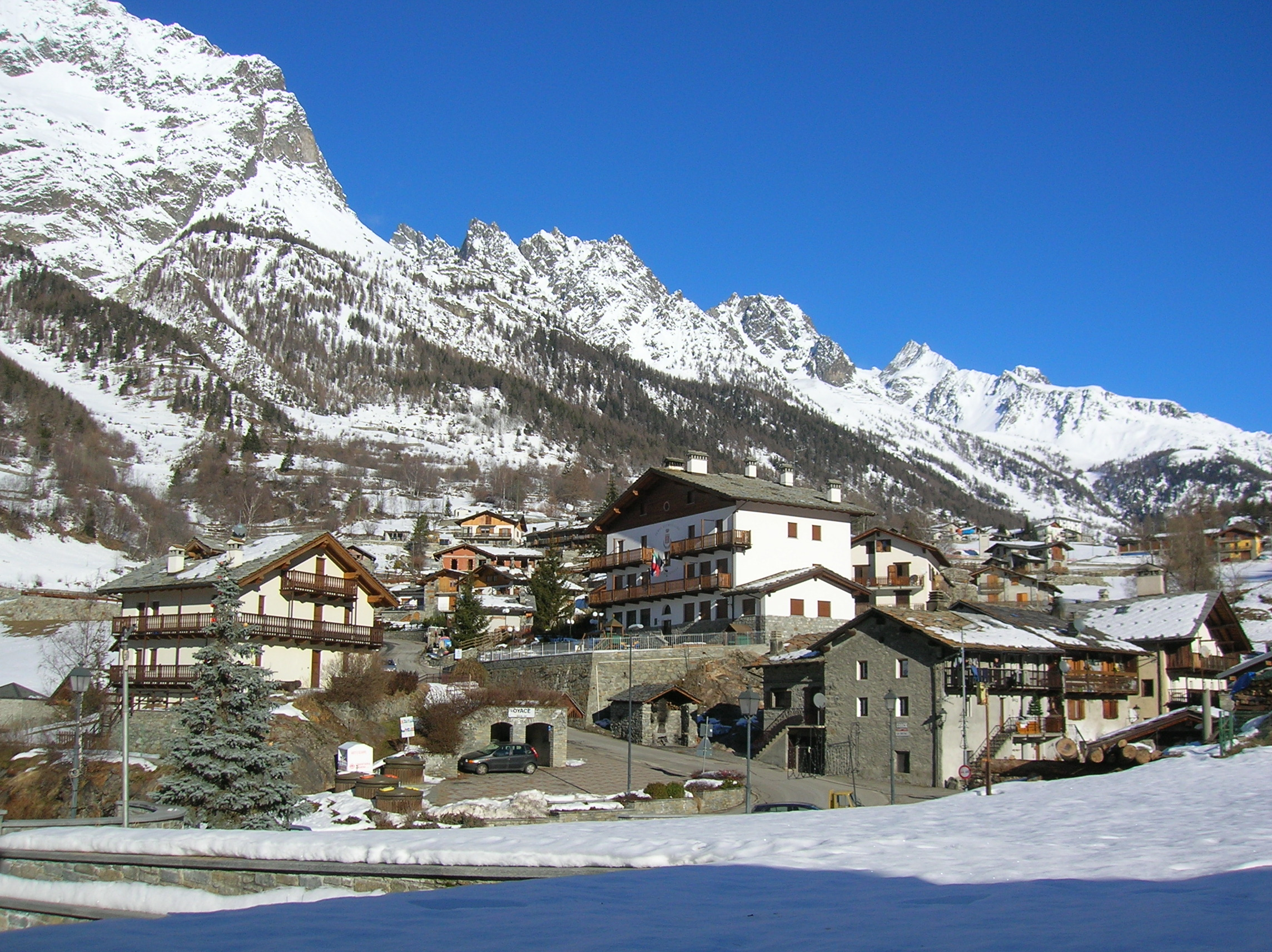

- Coat of arms

- Location within Italy Location within Aosta Valley
- Coordinates: 45°51′N 7°23′E
- Country: Italy
- Region: Aosta Valley
- Province: none
- Frazioni: Bérrioz, Chez les Brédy, Gallian, La Crétaz (chef-lieu), Sergnau, Condemine, Closé, Bouyoz, Chez les Chenaux, Grenier, Vernosse, Voisinal, Pied-de-Ville, La Rissaz

Area
  - Total: 30 km^{2} (12 sq mi)
- Elevation: 1,377 m (4,518 ft)

Population (31 December 2022)
  - Total: 209
  - Density: 7.0/km^{2} (18/sq mi)
- Demonym: Rossons
- Time zone: UTC+1 (CET)
  - Summer (DST): UTC+2 (CEST)
- Postal code: 11010
- Dialing code: 0165
- ISTAT code: 7047
- Patron saint: Archangel Michael
- Saint day: 29 September
- Website: Official website

Oyace (French: [ɔjas]) is a town and comune in the Aosta Valley region of north-western Italy.
