= Valdôtain dialect =

Dialect of Franco-Provençal

Valdôtain
- valdotèn
- Native to: Italy
- Region: Aosta Valley
- Native speakers: Approximately 68,000 people (2003)
- Language family: Indo-European: Italic; Latino-Faliscan; Latin; Romance; Italo-Western; Western Romance; Gallo-Iberian?; Gallo-Romance; Gallo-Rhaetian?; Arpitan–Oïl; Franco-Provençal; Valdôtain
- Writing system: Latin

Official status
- Official language in: Protected by statute in the Aosta Valley, Italy
- Regulated by: Bureau régional pour l'ethnologie et la linguistique (BREL)

Language codes
- ISO 639-3: –
- Glottolog: vall1249
- IETF: frp-u-sd-it23

Valdôtain (French pronunciation: [valdotɛ̃]; endonym: Valdotèn, Valdŏtèn, Valdouhtan) is a dialect of Arpitan (Franco-Provençal) spoken in the Aosta Valley in Italy, and the common language of the Aosta Valley. It is commonly known as patois or patoué. It is not an official language, the two regional official languages being French and Italian, though it is officially recognized.

== Distribution and classification ==
The Aosta Valley represents the only region of the Franco-Provençal area where this language is still widely spoken natively among all age ranges of the population, with a 2001 survey reporting almost 58% of the population know Franco-Provençal. A further 2003 study confirmed the status of Franco-Provençal as a main language for a majority of the population, with significant multilingualism.

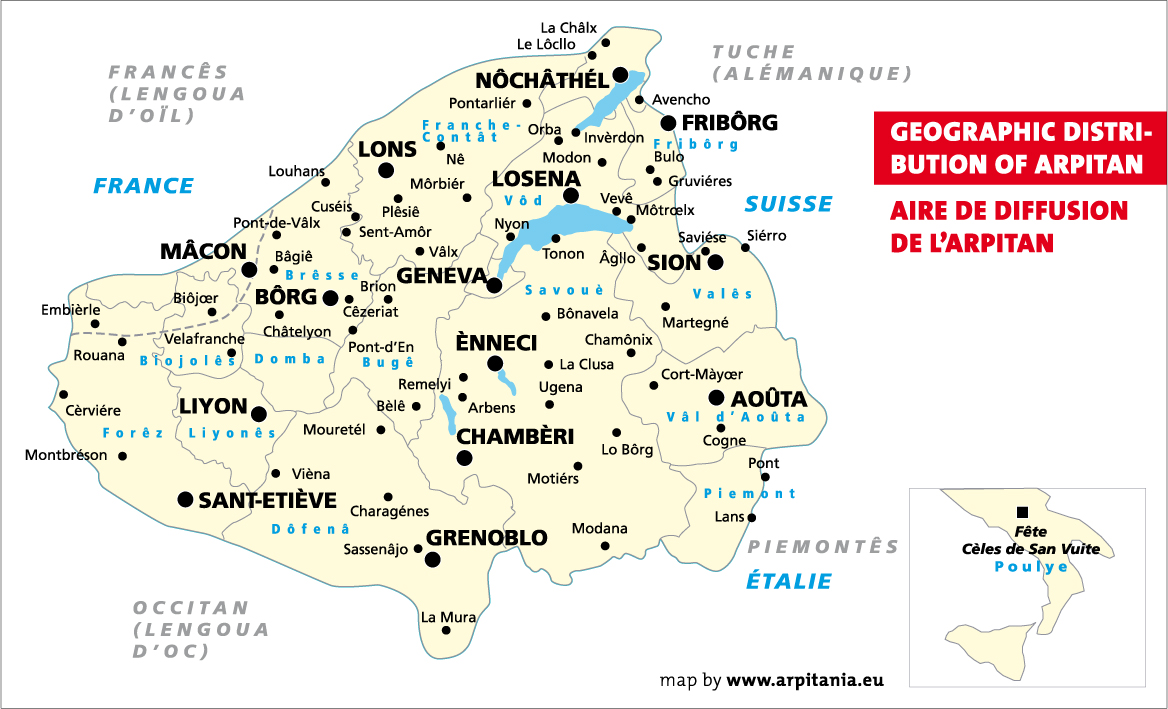
Map of the geographic distribution of Franco-Provençal, also known as Arpitan. The Aosta Valley, written as Vâl d'Aoûta, is on the right.

It has been said that in the Aosta Valley there are as many forms of patois as there are bell towers, in reference to the high linguistic diversity in the region within the Valdôtain varieties of Franco-Provençal. However, they can be broadly classified into two main branches: those of the Upper Valley (French: haute Vallée, Italian: alta valle) to the west and of the Lower Valley (French: basse Vallée, Italian: bassa valle) to the east of the city of Aosta. Valdôtain varieties from the Upper Valley tend to be more innovative and have more affinity with from varieties spoken in Savoy and in Valais, across the national borders; meanwhile, those from the Lower Valley tend to be more conservative, with influence from Piedmontese.

The urban variety of Aosta itself (Arpitan: patoué de la Veulla, lit. 'Patois of the City') has often been considered 'neutral', especially for the local-language media.

== Vocabulary examples ==
Several subdialects of Valdôtain exist that exhibit unique features in terms of phonetics and vocabulary.

Italian	French	West					Central-North				Central-Southeast		East				
Italian	French	La Thuile	La Salle	Rhêmes-Saint-Georges	Valsavarenche	Cogne	Sarre	Saint-Oyen	Oyace	Quart	Fénis	Champorcher	Valtournenche	Ayas	Emarèse	Arnad	Gaby
rastrello	râteau	rassi	râhé	rahi	rahi	raté	rati	râti	râti	raté	râti	rati	râté	rahtél	rahté	rahté	rahtél
fiore	fleur	flôr	fleu	fleur	fleure	fieur	fleur	flôr	fleu	fleur	fleur	fior	flour	fiour	fiour	fiour	fiour
volpe	renard, goupil	rèinâr	rèinâ	rèinar	rèinâr	rèinèar	rèinâr	rèinâ	rèinâr	rèinâr	rèinal	verpeuill	gorpeul	gorpéi	gorpeui	gorpeui	voulp
sì	oui, ouais	voué	vouè	vouè	ouè	vouài	ouè	ouè	vouè	vouè	ouè	ouèi	ò	òi	òi	òi	òi

== Linguistic studies ==
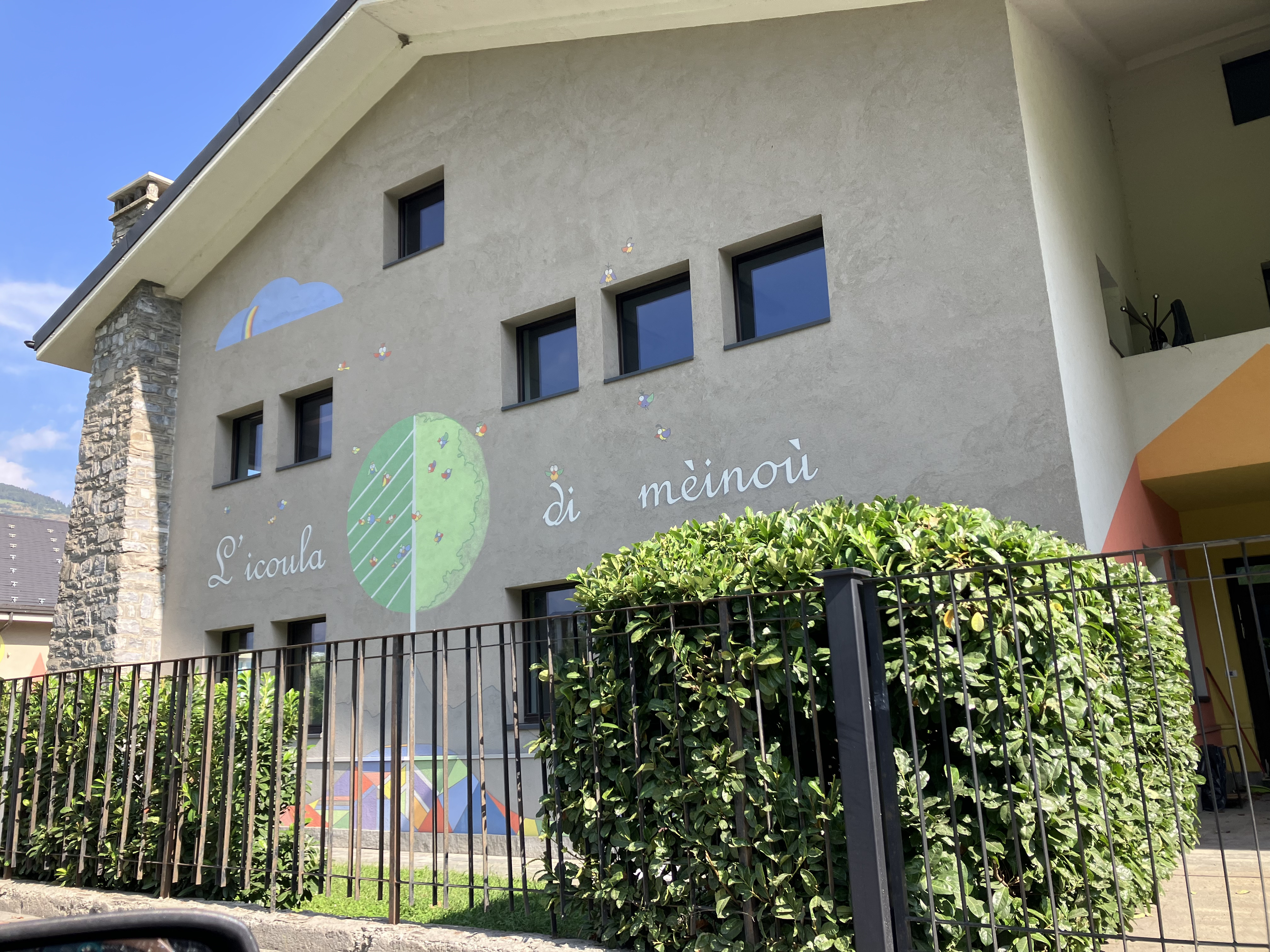
Valdôtain sign on primary school ("L'icoula di mèinoù", lit. meaning "children's school") at Plan-Félinaz, Charvensod.

Valdôtain has been the subject of detailed study at the Bureau régional pour l'ethnologie et la linguistique (BREL) in Aosta as well as in the Centre d'études francoprovençales in Saint-Nicolas.

== Music ==
The main modern singers and songwriters in Valdôtain are:

- Louis de Jyaryot, from Ayas;
- Maura Susanna, from Saint-Vincent;
- Magui Bétemps, from Valtournenche.

The traditional Aostan songs in Valdôtain and in French form the core of the activity of the band Trouveur valdotèn.

== Poetry ==
Here is a selection of some of the most important poets in Valdôtain:

Cllier et seren lo ten apré la piôdze
Cé bé soleil que torne égueeyìno la Val
I sorton le feumélle ch'achèté su la lôye
In precassèn de queut tant bien que mal[...]

— André Ferré (Saint-Vincent, 1904-1954)

Esplojon de meuseucca
Feusette de joèce
Tsarriemèn de note que chorton
Su lé, iou lé clliotse dzalaouse
Le vardon a catson [...]

— Palmyre Arbaney-Farcoz (Doues, 1900 - Aosta, 1980)

De nët euna leumiére
I berdzè l'at paru
Un andze vin leur dëre:
"Lo Saveur l'est neissu:
un pouro baou l'est son palatse
et sat pei de fen en traver
compouson lo deur matelatse
De ci gran Rei de l'univer;
et din la rigueur de l'iver
de dò trei lindzo l'est qeuveur

— La pastorala, Jean-Baptiste Celogne (Saint-Nicolas, 1826 - Saint-Pierre, 1910)

Y son vignà de bon matèn<
a désèi lo for
Adeline e Dzeusepèn
son lé prumì dou tor.
Pôrton lo bôch de biôla
é eun grou sac pesàn,
lo vouidon su la tôla
pé fare lo bon pan

— Césarine Binel (Champdepraz, 1897 - 1956)

Dz'é vu su 'na louye, quase se presta a à tsére ba,
Dé géragnon coleur lilà.
Dz'é vu su 'na viéille fenétra, flourì i soleil
Dé géragnon blan comme la nèi.
Dz'é vu pendre, de la terasse de 'na villà
Dé géragnon coleur fouà.
Fleur di pouro, fleur di reutso, géragnon,
Vo-éte la garniteura de totte le meison.
Vo no portade lo sourire di bon Djeu
Afen de no rendre tcheu moén malereu

— Anaïs Ronc-Désaymonet (Arpuilles, 1890 - Aosta, 1955)

== See also ==
- Aostan French
- Languages of Italy

== Bibliography ==
- (in French) Jules Brocherel, Le Patois et la langue française en Vallée d'Aoste éd. V. Attinger, Neuchâtel
- (in French) Aimé Chenal, Le franco-provençal valdotain. Morphologie et Syntaxe, Aoste, Musumeci éditeur, 1986, ISBN 8870322327
- (in French) Alexis Bétemps, La langue française en Vallée d'Aoste de 1945 à nos jours, Milan, T.D.L.,
- (in French) Hans-Erich Keller, Études linguistiques sur les parlers valdôtains, éd. A. Francke S.A., Berne, 1958.
- (in French) Ernest Schüle, Histoire linguistique de la Vallée d’Aoste, dans "Bulletin du Centre d’études francoprovençales" n° 22, Imprimerie Valdôtaine, Aoste, 1990.
- (in French) Xavier Favre, Histoire linguistique de la Vallée d’Aoste, dans "Espace, temps et culture en Vallée d’Aoste", Imprimerie Valdôtaine, Aoste, 1996.
- (in French) François-Gabriel Frutaz, Les origines de la langue française en Vallée d’Aoste, Imprimerie Marguerettaz, Aoste, 1913.
- (in French) Édouard Bérard, La langue française dans la Vallée d’Aoste, Aoste, 1861.
- (in French) Alexis Bétemps, Les Valdôtains et leur langue, préface de Henri Armand, Imprimerie Duc, Aoste, 1979.
- (in French) Alexis Bétemps, Le bilinguisme en Vallée d’Aoste : problèmes et perspectives, dans "Les minorités ethniques en Europe", par les soins de A.-L. Sanguin, l’Harmattan, Paris, 1993, pages 131-135.
- (in French) Bétemps, Alexis, Le francoprovençal en Vallée d’Aoste. Problèmes et prospectives, dans Lingua e comunicazione simbolica nella cultura walser, VI. Walsertreffen (6ème rencontre des Walsers), Fondazione Monti, Ausola d’Assola, 1989, p. 355-372
