= Verrès Castle =

14th-century castle in Verrès, Aosta Valley, Italy

- Castello di Verrès; Château de Verrès
- Italy
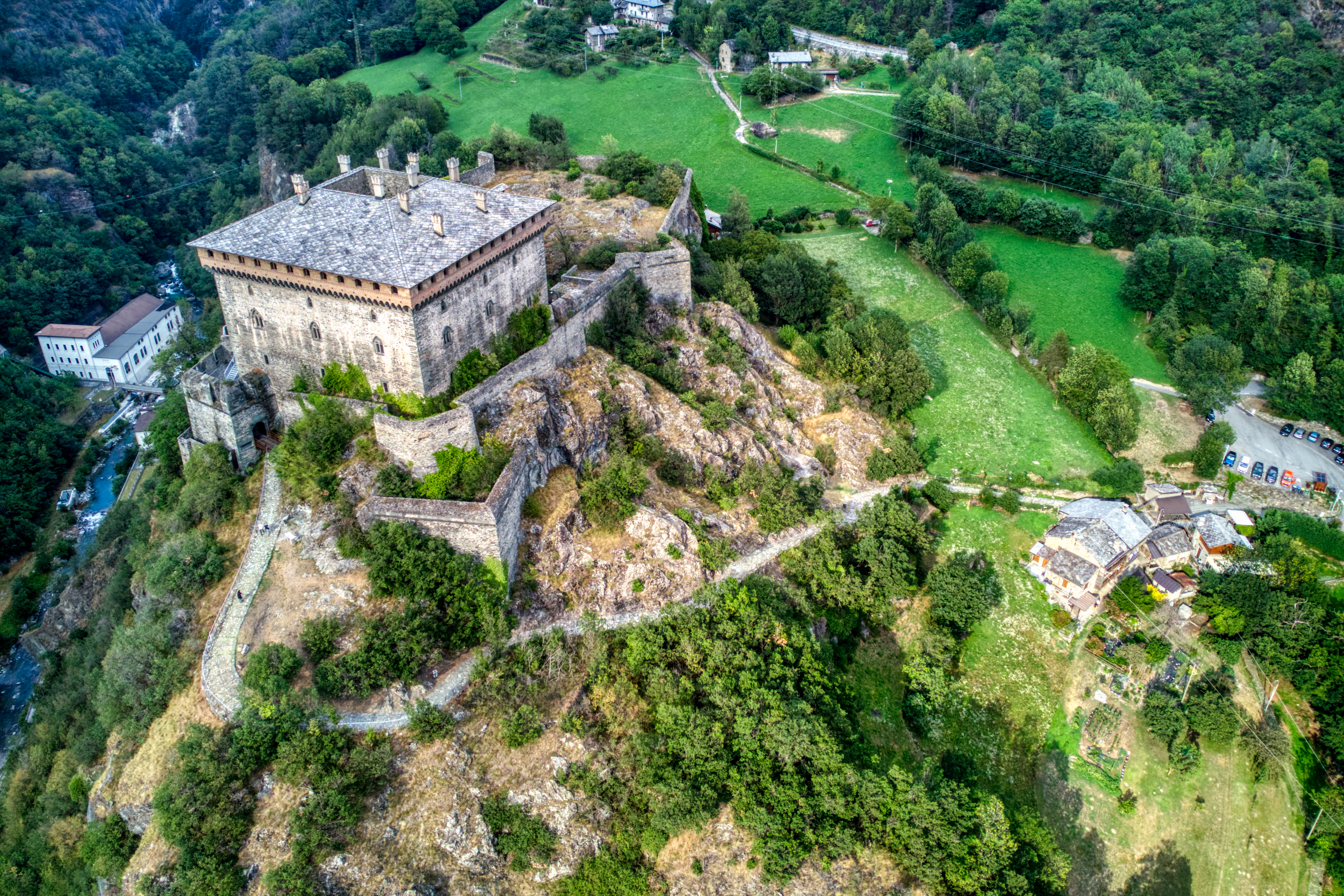
- View of Verrès Castle from above

Site information
- Type: Castle
- Owner: Autonomous Region Aosta Valley
- Controlled by: Challant family
- Open to the public: yes
- Condition: restored

Location
- Coordinates: 45.6700°N 7.6958°E

Site history
- Built: 1390
- Built by: Challant family (Yblet of Challant)
- In use: 1390–1661

Verrès Castle (Italian: Castello di Verrès, French: Château de Verrès) is a fortified 14th-century castle in Verrès, in the lower Aosta Valley, in north-western Italy. It has been called one of the most impressive buildings from the Middle Ages in the area. Built as a military fortress by Yblet de Challant in the fourteenth century, it was one of the first examples of a castle constructed as a single structure rather than as a series of buildings enclosed in a circuit wall.

The castle stands on a rocky promontory on the opposite side of the Dora Baltea from Issogne Castle. The castle dominates the town of Verrès and the access to the Val d'Ayas. From the outside it looks like an austere cube, thirty metres long on each side and practically free of decorative elements.

== History ==
=== Origins ===
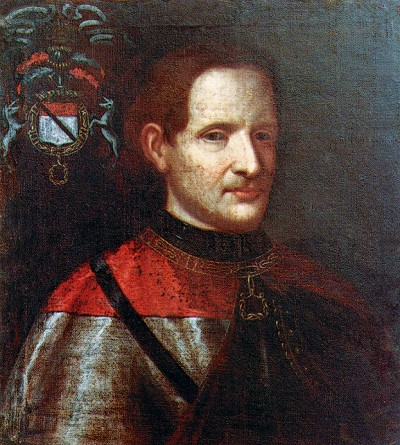
Portrait of Yblet de Challant

The earliest documents attesting the existence of a castle at Verrès (in the possession of the De Verretio family) date to 1287. At that time, control of the area was contested between the Bishop of Aosta and some noble families which were vassals of the Counts of Savoy: the De Turrilia, De Arnado, and De Verretio. The De Verretio in particular had harsh disagreements with the prelate over the years, which culminated in the episcopal casaforte in Issogne in 1333.

Around the middle of the fourteenth century, the De Verretio became extinct without leaving any possible heirs, so their property came into the possession of the counts of Savoy, who granted it to Yblet de Challant in 1372 as a reward for diverse duties discharged in their service.

Yblet entirely rebuilt the castle, producing a fortress that was practically impenetrable and distinct from most of the contemporary castles of the region which consisted of a number of buildings surrounded by a circuit wall.

An inscription in Latin on the architrave of the first gate as one approaches from the plain records the completion of Yblet's work in 1390:

MCCCLXXXX Magnific(us) D(omi)nus Eball(us) D(omi)nus Challandi Montioveti, etc. edificare fecit hoc castrum viventibus egregiis viris Francisco de Challand D(omi)nus de Bossonens et Castellionis et Joh(ann)e de Challand D(omi)no de Cossona ei(us) filiis.

Translation:

In 1390 the magnific[ent] L[or]d Ebal, L[or]d of Challant, Montjovet, etc. had this castle built when two excellent men were living: François de Challant, L[or]d of Bossonnens and Châtillon, and Jean de Challant, Lord of Cossonay - his sons

=== Fifteenth century ===
At the death of Yblet in 1409, the castle and his other possessions passed to his son François de Challant, who received the title of first Count of Challant from Amadeus VIII the Duke of Savoy on 15 August 1424. Verrès remained one of his most important properties, but he did not alter the castle in any substantial way.

François died in 1442 without male heirs and left his property to his daughters Marguerite and Catherine. Verrès castle thus became the centre of an inheritance dispute between Catherine who claimed it for herself under her father's will and some of her male cousins, including Jacques de Challant who contested the will on the basis of the Salic law, which did not permit succession in the female line.

Verrès became one of the strongholds of Catherine and her husband Pierre Sarriod d'Introd during this conflict with Jacques. Legend has it that, on Trinity Sunday 1449 Catherine and Pierre left the castle and went down to the town square, where they danced with the youth of the town. This noticeably increased the populace's support for Catherine and is reenacted annually in the historic carnival of Verrès.

In 1456, after the death of her husband in an ambush, Catherine was forced to surrender herself and her property, including the estate and castle of Verrès, which passed to Jacques de Challant who became the second count of Challant.

=== The sixteenth century fortress ===
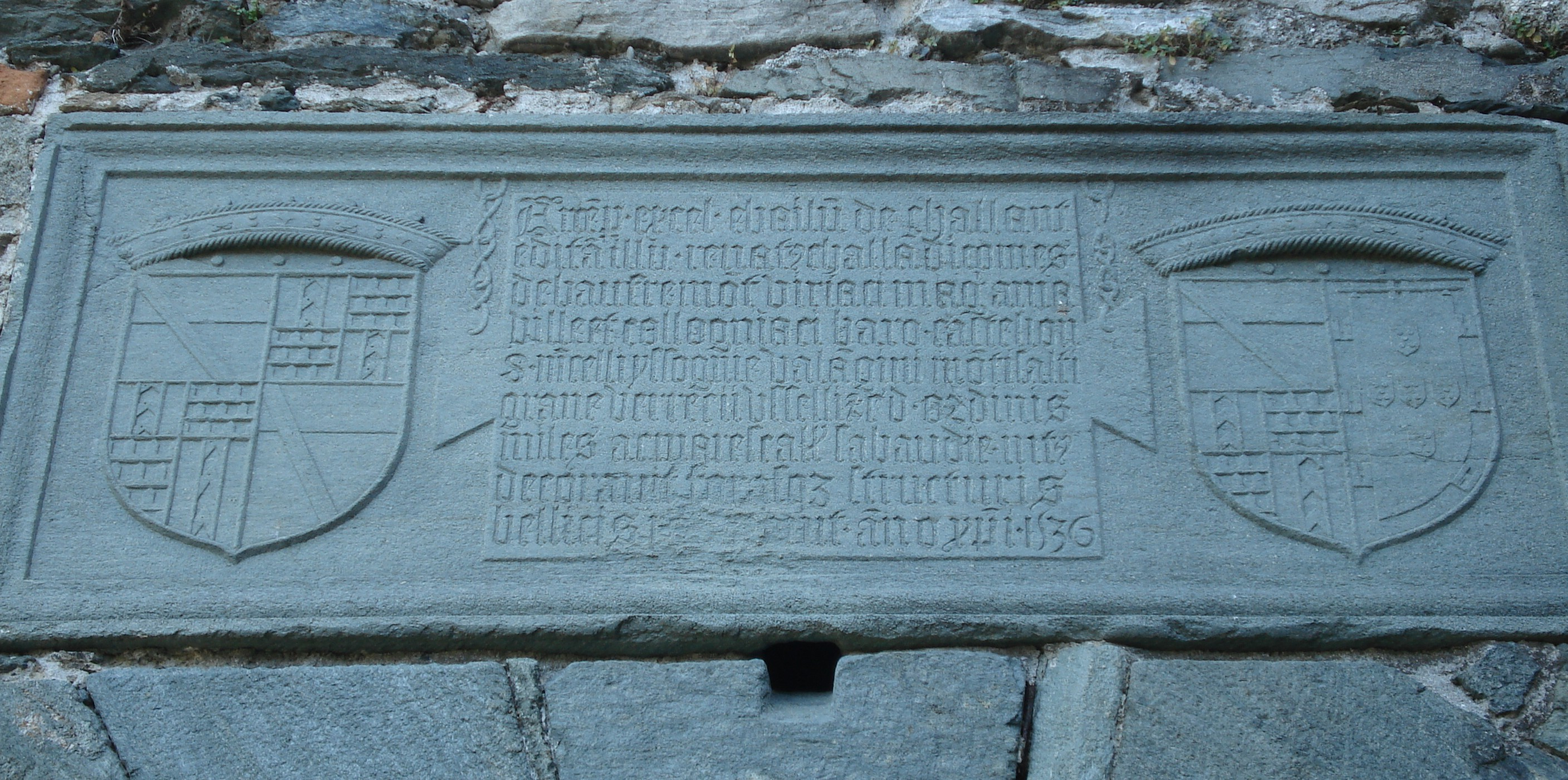
Inscription above the entrance to the castle's vestibule

The castle followed the vicissitudes of the descendants of Jacques thereafter, passing first to his son Louis, then to his nephew Philibert and then to Philibert's son René, who restored the more comfortable castle at Issogne and made that his residence.

Since its construction by Yblet about a hundred and fifty years earlier, the castle had not received any particular renovations or maintenance work. In 1536, René renovated the fortress to take account of the appearance of firearms, with the help of the Spanish captain Pietro de Valle, a famous military architect. He had the base of the cubic structure surrounded by a circuit wall with counterforts and polygonal turrets, adapted to cope with cannons and equipped with pieces of artillery brought from his fief of Valangin in Switzerland. René must also be responsible for the current vestibule, accessed by a drawbridge, for new windows and for new gates with Moorish arches.

The construction work is recorded on a stone inscription above the entrance to the vestibule, accompanied by the arms of René de Challant (on the left of the text) and those of his second wife Mencia de Braganza (on the right):

Arcem per excellentissimum Ebailum de Challant editam illustris Renatus Challandi comes de Baufremont, Viriaci Magni, Ama Ville et Collogniaci, baro. castellionis S. Marcelli, Yssognie, Valangini, Montisalti, Grane, Verrecii, Usselli etc. dominus ordinis miles ac marescallus Sabaudie. intus decorauit forasque structuris bellicis (muniu)it. anno Xpi. 1536.

Translation:

The illustrious René de Challant, Count of Beaufremont, Virieu-le-Grand, Aymavilles and Coligny, Lord of the castles of Saint-Marcel, Issogne, Valangin, Montalto Dora, Graines, Verrès, Ussel etc., Lord Knight of the Order and Marshal of Savoy decorated inside this citadel built by the most excellent Ybalt de Challant and (fortif)ied the exterior with military structures. In the 1536th year of Christ.

=== Decline and recovery in the nineteenth century ===
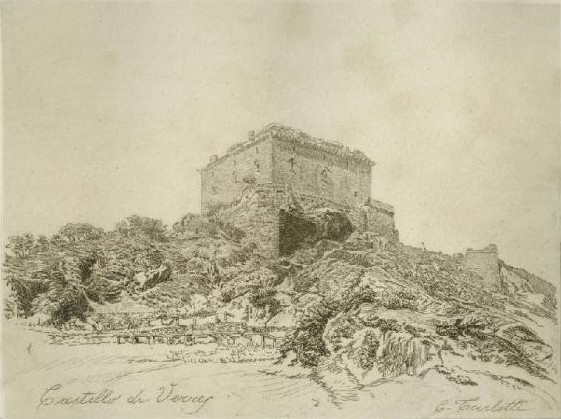
Verrès castle in a nineteenth century engraving by Celestino Turletti

At Rene de Challant's death without male heirs in 1565, his property passed to his son-in-law Giovanni Federico Madruzzo who was married to his daughter Isabel, beginning a long legal conflict with other male members of the Challant family, once again based on the Salic law, under which Isabel could not inherit her father's property.

Therefore, the House of Savoy took direct control of Verrès castle, turning it into a look out and military garrison, but in 1661 Duke Charles Emmanuel II had the armaments of the castle dismantled and transferred (along with those of Saint-Germain Castle) to Fort Bard, which was in a more strategic position for control of the Aosta Valley. Verrès was abandoned.

In 1696, the legal dispute between the heirs of Isabel de Challant and the Challant family finally came to an end and the castle returned to the Challant family. The castle remained their property until the extinction of their house in the nineteenth century, but it was no longer inhabited and fell into ruin. The strong exterior walls held up well, but the wooden roof was removed as punishment for not paying taxes, leaving the top floor exposed to the elements.

After a series of transfers it was finally acquired from Alfredo d'Andrade in 1894 by the Italian state in 1894 and placed under the Superintendency for monuments of Piedmont and Liguria, which carried out restoration work. After the Second World War, the castle was declared a Monument of Italy and came under the authority of the Aosta Valley which rebuilt the stone casing in the 1980s. A final restoration was undertaken in 1994.

In 2004 the castle was closed to allow strengthening and adjustment of the structure. Since it was reopened in 2007 it has been open to guided tours.

== Description ==
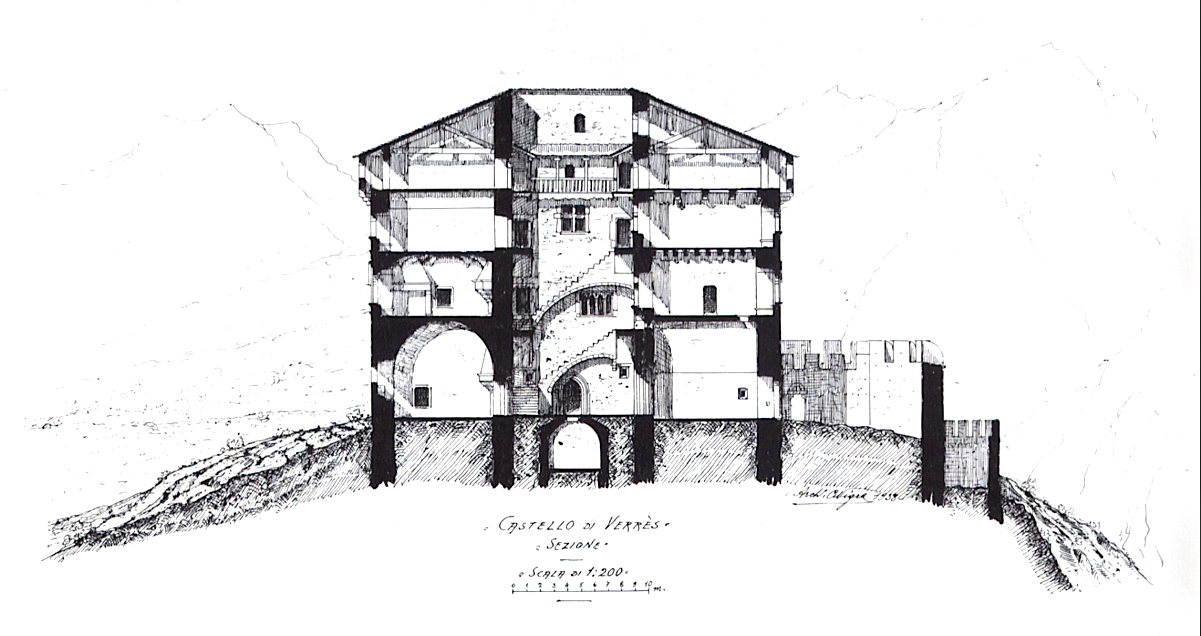
Cross-section of the castle

The castle, constructed as a military fortress, sits atop a rocky premonitory above the river Évançon and dominates the town of Verrès. In addition to being difficult to reach and easy to defend, its position allowed it to control the country below: the central valley and the Val d'Ayas pass which was then an important route. In the eighteenth century, the Aostan historian Jean-Baptiste de Tillier wrote about the castle, saying:

Et l'on peut dire sans exagération que c'est un des plus solides et plus fameux batiments qu'un vassal ait pu faire construire dans le domaine d'un prince souverain où celluy-cy tient le rang d'un des plus renommés

— Jean-Baptiste de Tillier, Historique de la Vallée d'Aoste
Translation:

And one can say without exaggeration that it is one of the most solid and most famous bastions that a vassal could have built in the domain of a sovereign prince – within which it is one of the most renowned.

Externally it is an austere cube, about 30 metres on each side, surrounded at the base by a circuit wall which encircles the entire summit of the peak. The walls (some more than 2.5 metres thick) are surmounted by a continuous line of battlements, which hide a storm drain, with Medieval mullioned and Renaissance cruciformed windows.

=== Entrance ===
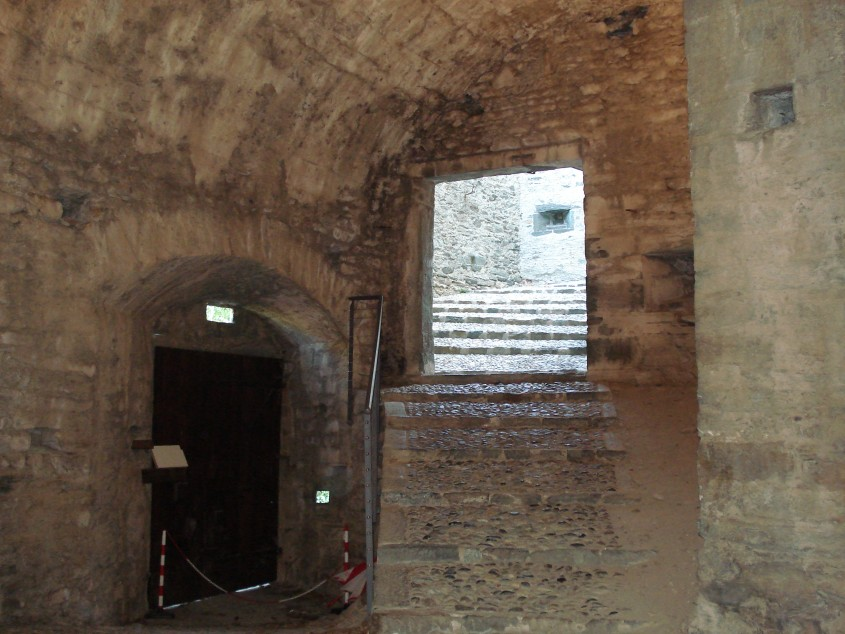
The entrance, on the way up from the vestibule

Every element of the castle seems to have been considered to make the fortress more defensible. The visitor ascends on foot along a mule track, which winds up the mountain until it reaches the entrance in the circuit wall, accessed by means of a drawbridge. This entrance, like the external circuit wall, was built by Rene de Challant in the sixteenth century, as indicated by the inscription above the gate.

As the visitor follows the path up to the castle, the fortress is always on his right side. This was another defensive feature, since the soldiers of the time usually carried their shield in their left hand and therefore the right side was exposed.

Beyond the gate there is a vestibule with a curving stairway to make it difficult to use a battering ram. In this space there is a door which leads to an inner compound, once occupied by the stables, and to the ramparts -not accessible to visitors.

Above the vestibule is the gatehouse, on top of the dungeon and now the location of the ticket office for visitors to the manor. Its front is the true entrance to the castle – a round arch and a pointed arch with a wooden door reinforced by nails in imitation of the original door.

=== Ground floor ===
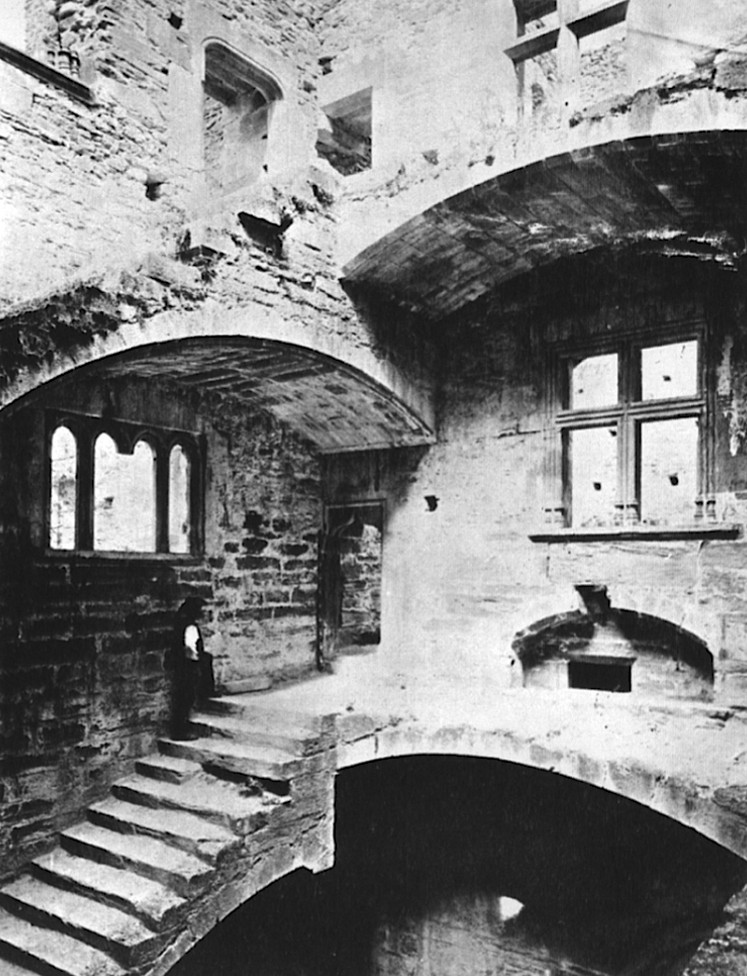
The weighty staircase which occupies the centre of Verrès castle (photo from the beginning of the twentieth century)

Inside the castle is a square entrance hall roofed by a vault of pointed arches, a further defensive element. Several loopholes look into the hall and there is a trapdoor in the ceiling from which it would have been possible to bombard any invaders trapped inside.

In order to actually enter the core of the manor it is necessary to pass through a double door with a round arch on the side facing into the entrance hall and a pointed arch on the side facing the inner courtyard – once protected by a portcullis separating the two doors.

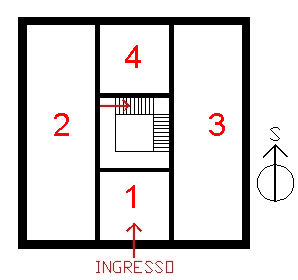
Plan of the ground floor: 1. Entrance hall; 2. Warehouse on the east side; 3. Barracks on the west side; 4. Kitchen

The inner courtyard of the castle is a simple square area from which two large halls, positioned on the east and west sides of the manor, can be accessed. The courtyard is open to the sky, allowing greater illumination of the rooms and the collection of rainwater in the grand cistern located below it. The pavement of the courtyard is sloped so that all the water converges at the centre, where there is an opening into the cistern. This reserve supply of water would be precious in the event of a siege.

The internal division of the castle is as simple as its exterior appearance. The ground floor is composed of three rooms in addition to the entrance hall, which surround the inner courtyard.

The entire eastern side of the castle is occupied by a large rectangular room covered by a round barrel vault. This was the only unheated room of the castle and most likely served as a warehouse and armoury. It is used as a ballroom during the annual celebration of the historic carnival.

On the opposite side is the large west hall, accessed by means of a gateway and covered by a pointed barrel vault. This hall, probably used for housing and dining by the soldiers and service personnel, was heated by two massive fireplaces and connected to the kitchen on the south side of the ground floor by a serving hatch and to the kitchen on the northwest of the floor above by a staircase.

A loophole looks into the entrance hall from this room. At some points here, the rocky ground pokes through: the castle is actually built into the naked rock and it would have been impossible to the remove the aforementioned rocks without compromising the structure's stability.

=== First floor ===
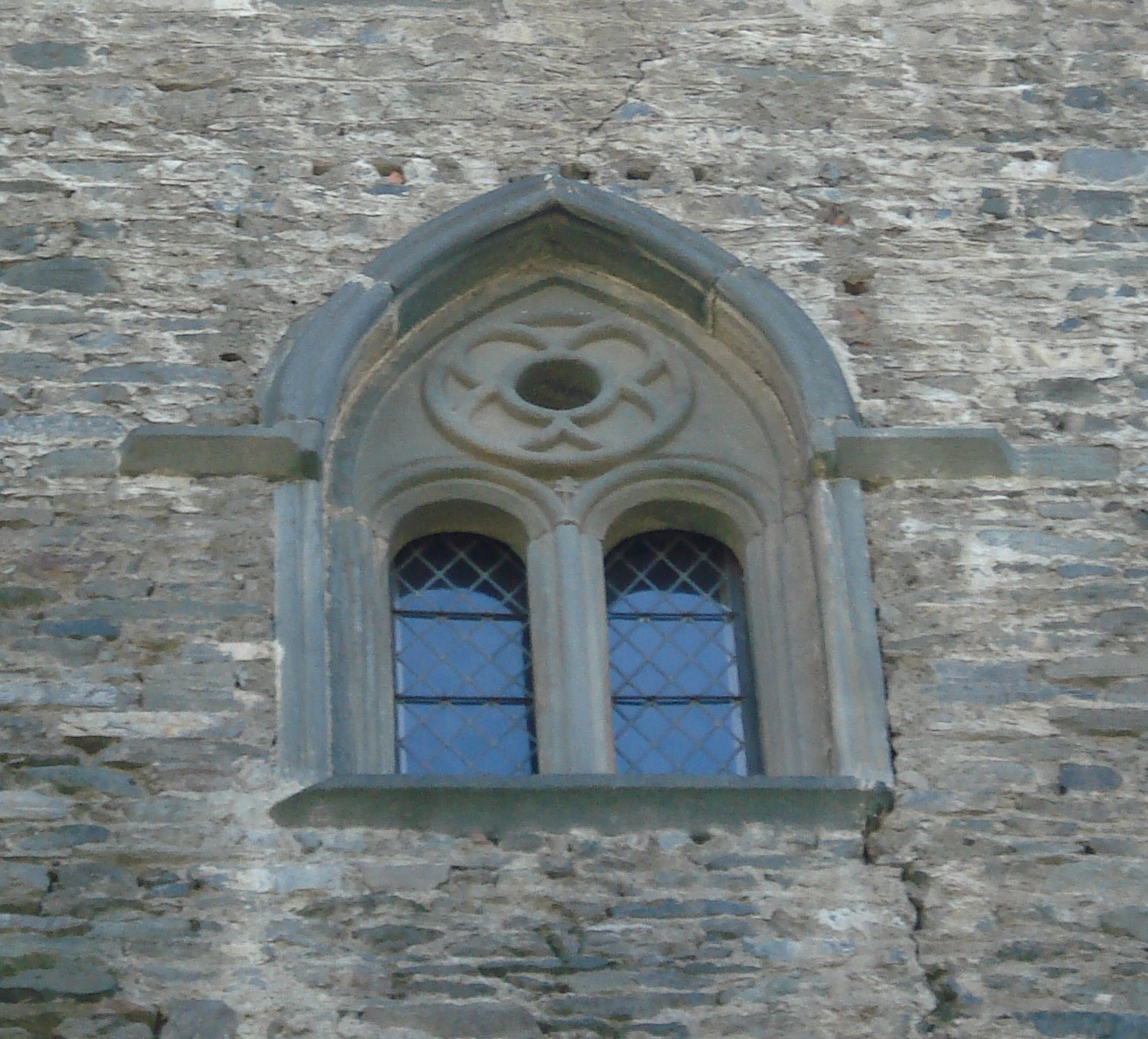
Detail of a mullioned window on the first floor

The first floor was reserved for the lord of the manor. It is reached by climbing up the monumental stairway on flying buttresses extending about two metres from the courtyard walls, which climb up the internal walls of the building.

The architrave of the first door which a person first meets as they climb the staircase bears the inscription which records that Yblet de Challant built the castle in 1390. The door itself leads to a room used as a gatehouse, which is located above the entrance hall. In the floor there is the trapdoor which allows bombardment of enemies in the room below. The room is lit by a window on the north side, through which it is possible to see Villa Castle in Challand-Saint-Victor.

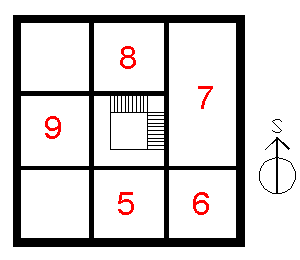
Plan of the first floor: 5. Room with the trapdoor; 6. Kitchen for the garrison; 7. Dining room; 8. Kitchen, connected by a hatch; 9. One of the bedrooms

A second kitchen for the garrison is accessed from this room, once connected to the hall on the ground floor by a staircase. The room is provided with a hatch which opens into the void on the northern side of the castle, like the rooms above and below – perhaps a form of secret escape route. The room also has a pantry in the wall, with a hole to allow the cold from outside to better conserve the food, and a fireplace in the wall which is shared with the lord's dining room, which had the double function of cooking the food and warming the adjacent room.

From the kitchen there is access to the room which served as the lord's dining room (also accessible from the staircase in the courtyard). This room occupied the rest of the waestern part of the floor. The hall was heated by two large brasiers located in the corners and was connected to the kitchen on the north side of the castle by a hatch. The room was lit from the outside by mullioned gothic windows and from the courtyard by a fourteenth century quadrifora window.

The lord's kitchen, located on the south side of the floor has three large fireplaces. The one on the side opposite the courtyard is of exceptional size and was originally designed to cook whole animals inside it. The room is covered by several ribbed vaults from the time of Rene de Challant, which have his coat of arms and the letters R and M (the initials of Rene and his wife Mencia) at the centre. This is the only part of the castle's roofing which is original – the rest was restored in the twentieth century. The eastern side of the kitchen is taken up by some cupboards on the wall and by a large pantry built into the wall.

The east side of this floor is taken up by the lord's bedrooms, heated by large stone fireplaces, covered by a cofferred wooden ceiling and equipped with a total of five latrines in the wall, which emptied onto the rocks below.

=== Second floor ===
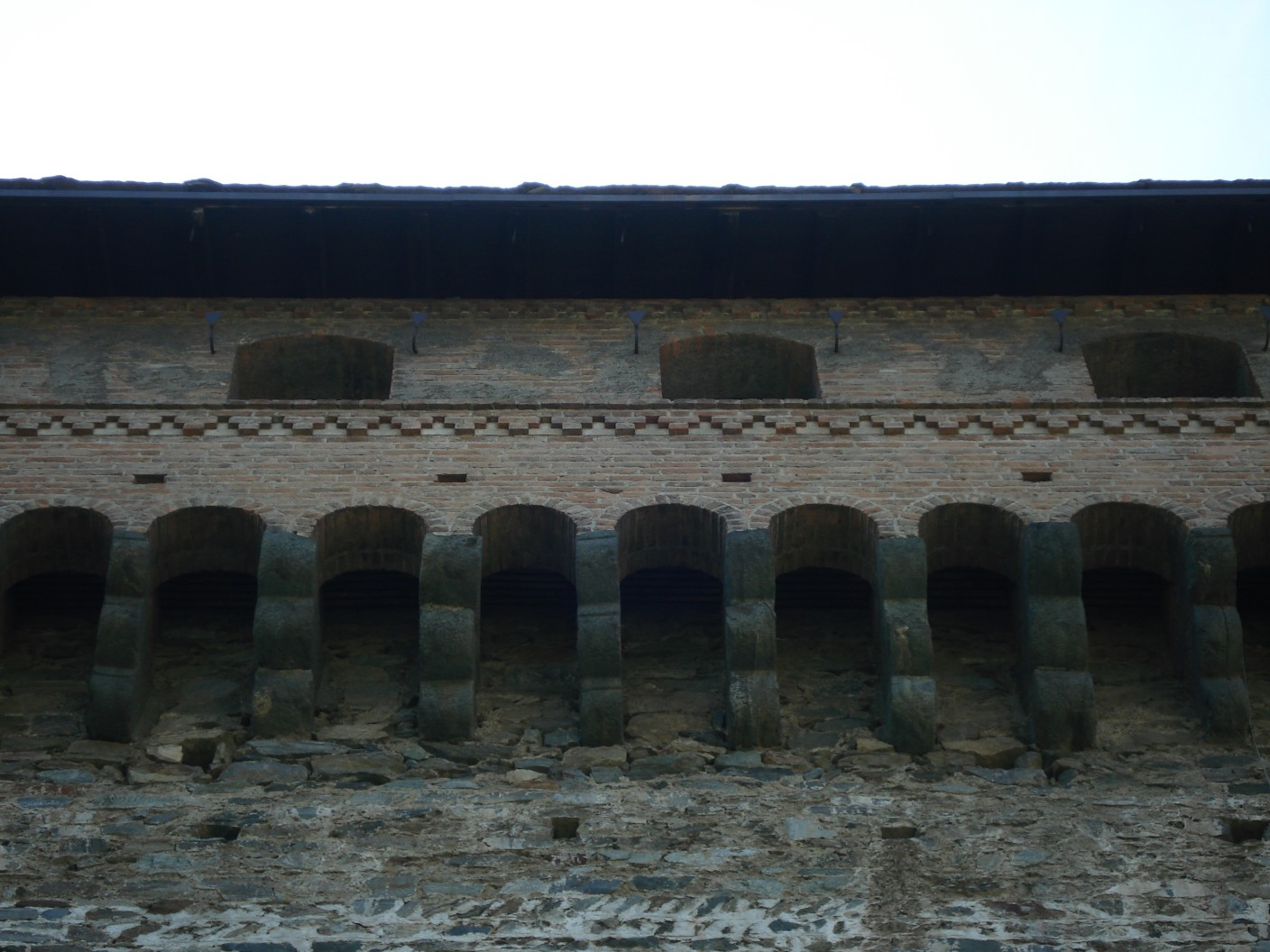
Detail of the corbels and machicolations which extend from the walls

The second floor of the bastion, which cannot be visited on the guided tour, replicates the division of the first floor and was probably used by functionaries and guests of the castle. Above the lord's dining hall is a hall, probably used at some point as a council hall. The wooden roof and stone fireplace of this hall, like those in the other rooms on this floor, were reconstructed and restored in the last few decades. They had been ruined by the weathering, to which they were exposed after the removal of the manor's roof. The rooms on the east side have two latrines like those on the first floor. The room above the kitchen in the northwest corner contains a hatch leading to a ledge on the outside, possibly used as a service exit or perhaps for signalling.

Wooden stairs, completely reconstructed, connect this floor to the attic. The rooms of the attic are subdivided in the same way as the floors below and were probably used by the soldiers and servants of the castle and for storing rocks. Going out from the attic, it is possible to access the Chemin de ronde which runs around the outside of the four sides of the building for about 120 metres and contains 148 machicolations. Going inwards there is a wooden gallery which faces the interior courtyard and whose roofing serves to drain rainwater into the courtyard. The stone roof was completely reconstructed in the 1980s.

== Verrès Castle in popular culture ==
Verrès Castle is one of the most visited monuments of the Aosta Valley. Between 2007 and 2009 it had around 20,000 visitors every year.

In 1884, the manor was used by Alfredo d'Andrade as one of his models for the Medieval Castle and Rock in Turin, which was built for the Italian General Artistic and Industrial Exhibition of that year.

Every year since 1949, on the occasion of the historic carnival, the people of Verrès celebrate the 31 May 1449, when Catherine de Challant and her husband Pierre d'Introd went down to the village square and began to dance with the townsmen. For the four days of the carnival, the castle hosts dinners, Masquerade balls, and performance of Giuseppe Giacosa's play, Una Partita a Scacchi (A Game of Chess).

== Bibliography ==
- Zanotto, André (1978). Guide des châteaux du Val d'Aoste. Éditions Musumeci. ISBN 88-7032-039-1.
- Frutaz, François-Gabriel (1900). Le château de Verrès et l'inventaire de son mobilier en 1565 (in French). Torino: Stamperia Reale della Ditta G. B. Paravia e C.
- Giacosa, Giuseppe (1905). I Castelli Valdostani. Casa editrice L.F. Cogliati Milano.
- Giacosa, Giuseppe (1972). Castelli Valdostani e Canavesani. Edizione Piemonte in Bancarella, Torino Fiorni, Corso Siccardi 4.
- Bona, Enrico D.; Costa Calcagno, Paola (1979). Castelli della Valle d'Aosta. Istituto geografico De Agostini-Serie Görlich.
- Ferrero, Anna Maria (1983). La rocca di Verrès. Torino: Editoriale Pedrini.
- AA.VV. (1993). Verrès et son château : sei secoli di storia, 1390-1990 : atti della tavola rotonda, Verrès 15 giugno 1991. Issogne: imprimerie paroissiale.
- Gatto Chanu, Tersilla; Cerutti, Augusta Vittoria (2001). Guida insolita ai misteri, ai segreti, alle leggende e alle curiosità della Valle d'Aosta. Newton & Compton Editori. ISBN 88-8289-564-5.
- Corni, Francesco (2008). Segni di pietra. Torri, castelli, manieri e residenze della Valle d'Aosta. Associazione Forte di Bard. ISBN 88-87677-33-6.
- Minola, Mauro; Ronco, Beppe (2002). Valle d'Aosta. Castelli e fortificazioni. Varese: Macchione ed. p. 22. ISBN 8883401166.
- Nigra, Carlo (1974). Torri e castelli e case forti del Piemonte dal 1000 al secolo XVI. La Valle d'Aosta. Quart (AO): Musumeci. pp. 62–68.
