= List of museums in the Aosta Valley =

This is a list of museums in the Aosta Valley, Italy.

image	name	address	city	coordinates
	Fort Bard	Via Vittorio Emanuele II, 89; 89, rue Victor-Emmanuel II	Bard	45.60894167°N 7.74546944°E
	Fénis Castle	Chez-Sapin	Fénis	45.737365°N 7.489551°E
	Issogne Castle	La Place	Issogne	45.65527778°N 7.68861111°E
	Verrès Castle	Localité Château, 1	Verrès	45.6697°N 7.69556°E
