= Évançon =

Stream in the Aosta Valley of Italy

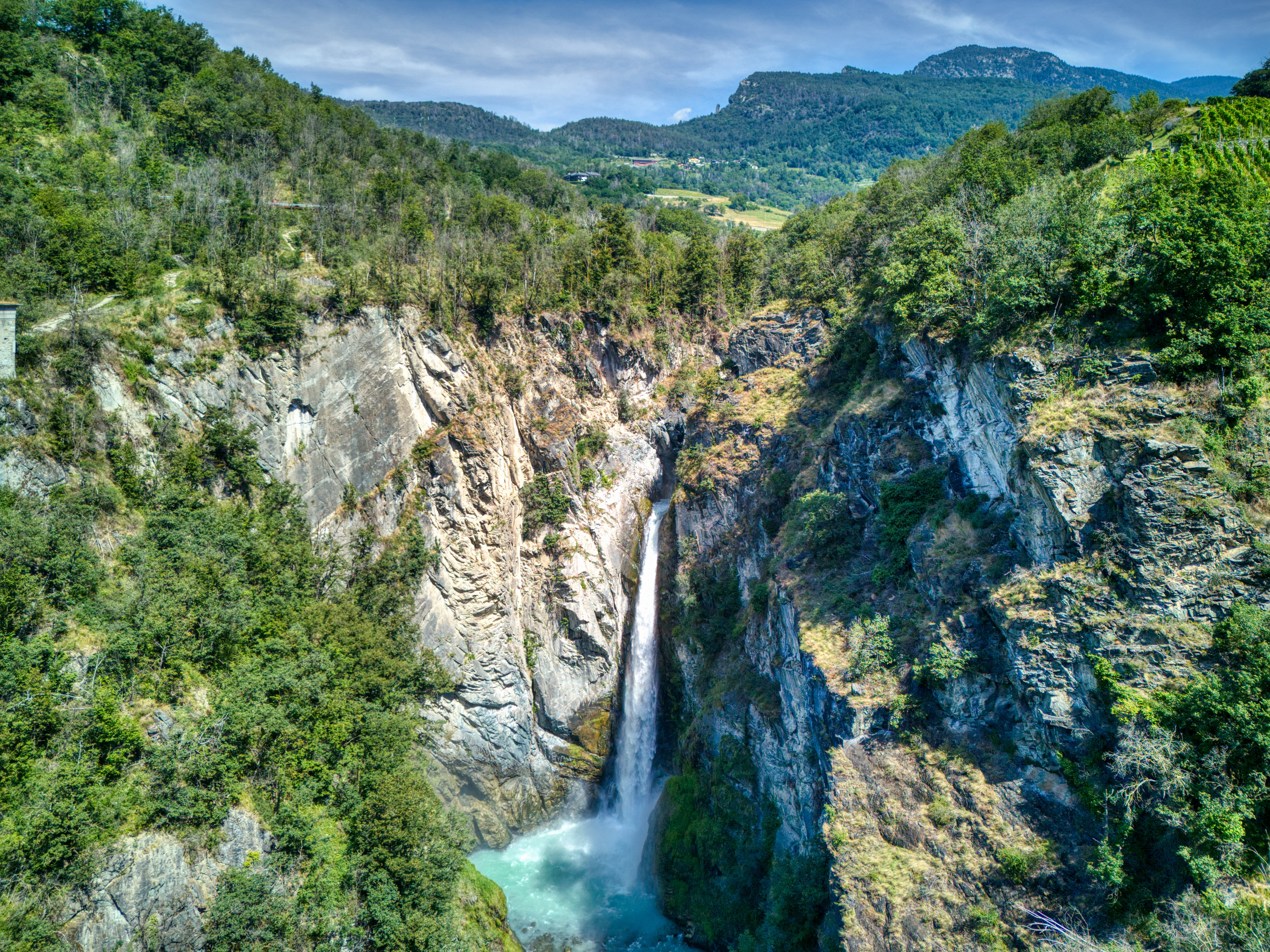

Location
- Country: Italy
- Region: Aosta Valley

Physical characteristics
- Source
  - location: Great Glacier of Verra
- Mouth
  - location: Doire baltée
  - coordinates: 45.663188°N 7.680705°E
- Length: 31 km (19 mi)
- Basin size: 245.82 km^{2} (94.91 sq mi)

Basin features
- Progression: Dora Baltea→ Po→ Adriatic Sea

The Évançon (French: [evɑ̃sɔ̃]; sometimes written Évençon as homophone) is the stream which flows through the val d'Ayas and flows into the Doire baltée. Its name in Franco-Provençal might mean "Grand River" or "River from the Mountaintops" (eva d'en som). In archival documents it is often referred to as l'eau blanche (French for "White water").

The Unité des communes valdôtaines de l'Évançon takes its name from the stream.

== Course ==
The stream has its origin in the Great Glacier of Verra at the top of the val d'Ayas. After coursing right through the valley, the Évançon flows into the Dora Baltea in Verrès, near the bridge of Fleuran. It flows through: Ayas, Brusson, Challand-Saint-Anselme and Challand-Saint-Victor. Near Targnod in the commune of Challand-Saint-Victor, the stream flows through the Gorge de Brisecou (French for "Breakneck Gorge") where it feeds the Isollaz Falls. Their base can be reached by a short walk from the road to Isollaz and a good observation spot can be reached by car on the road which leads to Verrès Castle.

The Évançon is a typical glacial river, which means that maximum flow is reached in the summer and the maximum flow occurs in winter. The colour of the water in the stream varies from azure in the morning and when it is cold through to a grey-white towards the evening and after a hot day. Only in winter the river is transparent, while in summer it is more or less clouded by sediment and sand from the glacier.

== Fauna ==
The stream is inhabited exclusively by trout (both brown and rainbow, repopulated annually by the regional fish consortium. Among the wildlife must be mentioned the white-throated dipper which is present in great numbers.

== Human activity ==
To protect the inhabited area of the plain which has suffered from flooding in the past, protective walls have been built. Unfortunately, in addition to harming the naturalness and aesthetic appearance of the stream, these have made it less hospitable to the trout.

Along its course the stream is used to produce hydroelectric power. In Brusson is located the Isollaz dam.
