= Émarèse =

Émarèse Émarésa (Valdôtain)
- Comune
- Comune di Émarèse; Commune d'Émarèse
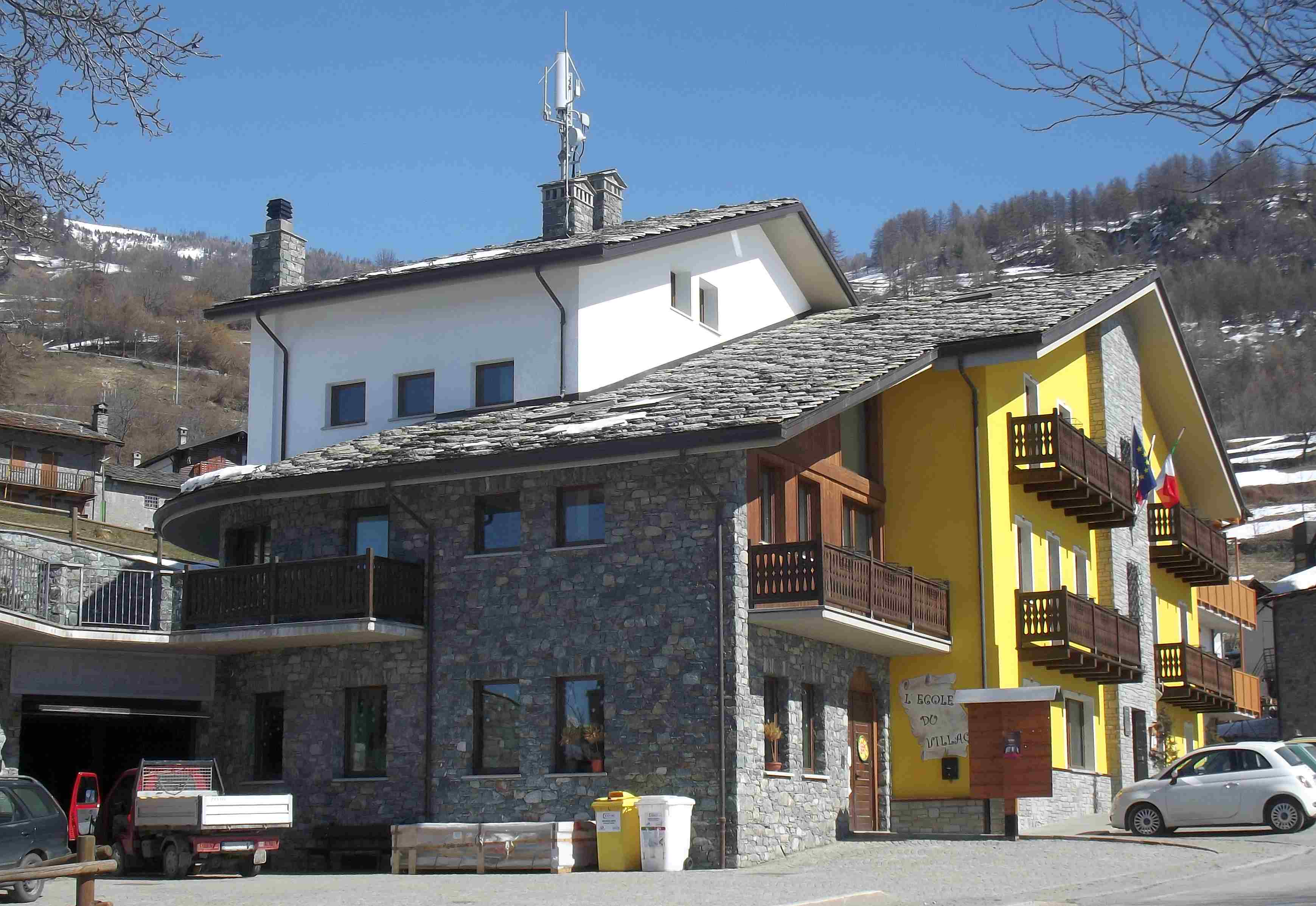
- Town hall in Érésaz

- Coat of arms

- Location within Italy Location within Aosta Valley
- Coordinates: 45°43′N 7°42′E
- Country: Italy
- Region: Aosta Valley
- Frazioni: Cheissan, Émarèse, Érésaz, Fontillun, Longeon, Ravet, La Saléraz, Sommarèse, Settarme

Government
  - Mayor: Lucina Grivon

Area
  - Total: 10.23 km^{2} (3.95 sq mi)
- Elevation: 1,170 m (3,840 ft)

Population (31 December 2022)
  - Total: 231
  - Density: 22.6/km^{2} (58.5/sq mi)
- Demonym: Émarésots
- Time zone: UTC+1 (CET)
  - Summer (DST): UTC+2 (CEST)
- Postal code: 11020
- Dialing code: 0166
- Website: Official website

Émarèse (French: [emaʁɛz]; Valdôtain: Émarésa) is a town and comune in the Aosta Valley region of north-western Italy. It has 213 inhabitants.

== Geography ==
The situation of the territory, located on the Northern part of Aosta Valley, favours sunlight conditions and landscape sightseeing. The elevation varies from 700 m to 2,107 m of Testa di Comagna.

The Tzecore Pass links Émarèse and Challand-Saint-Anselme.

The comune is composed by a small group of villages sitting in a wide valley overlooking Saint-Vincent, with a sunny climate that is shielded from the wind. The area was quite well known during the mid half of 18th century because its gold and asbestos mines. It has a mainly agricultural vocation, with recent development in tourism.

The landscape offers a large view to the summits of Becca di Viou and Mont Torché, to the mountain chain that from Rose des Bancs stretches to Mont Émilius and Rutor, as well as Mont-Blanc. Downwards, the landscape shows the towns in the central valley and the Dora Baltea river.

It is close to the Tzecore and to the Joux passes, at 1,640 m above sea level. The Joux Pass offers alpine ski facilities and cross-country slopes.

== Sights ==
- Parish Church of Saint Pantaleon, acknowledged since 1176, from 1373 merged with the church of Saint-Germain, then separated in 1747 by the bishop Pierre-François de Sales. The reconstruction, between 1882 and 1883, also raised the bell-tower. It hosts two wooden altars: one of the Madonna with two twisted columns, probably end of 17th century, in carved wood partly gilded; the other of St. Joseph from the beginning of the 18th century, also carved and gilded, restored after 1786.
- Chapelle de Saint-Roch, chapel existing before 1713, with an annexed building renewed in 1978–1979, celebrating the Holy Family.
- Borna de ghiasa, (Arpitan for "the iced hole"), natural cooler site, used in the past to keep ice and for food conservation in summertime.
- Abbé Trèves study center, located in the hamlet of Érésaz, it hosts documents and objects of Joseph-Marie Trèves.
