= Testa di Comagna =

Mountain in Italy

- (in French) Tête de Comagne
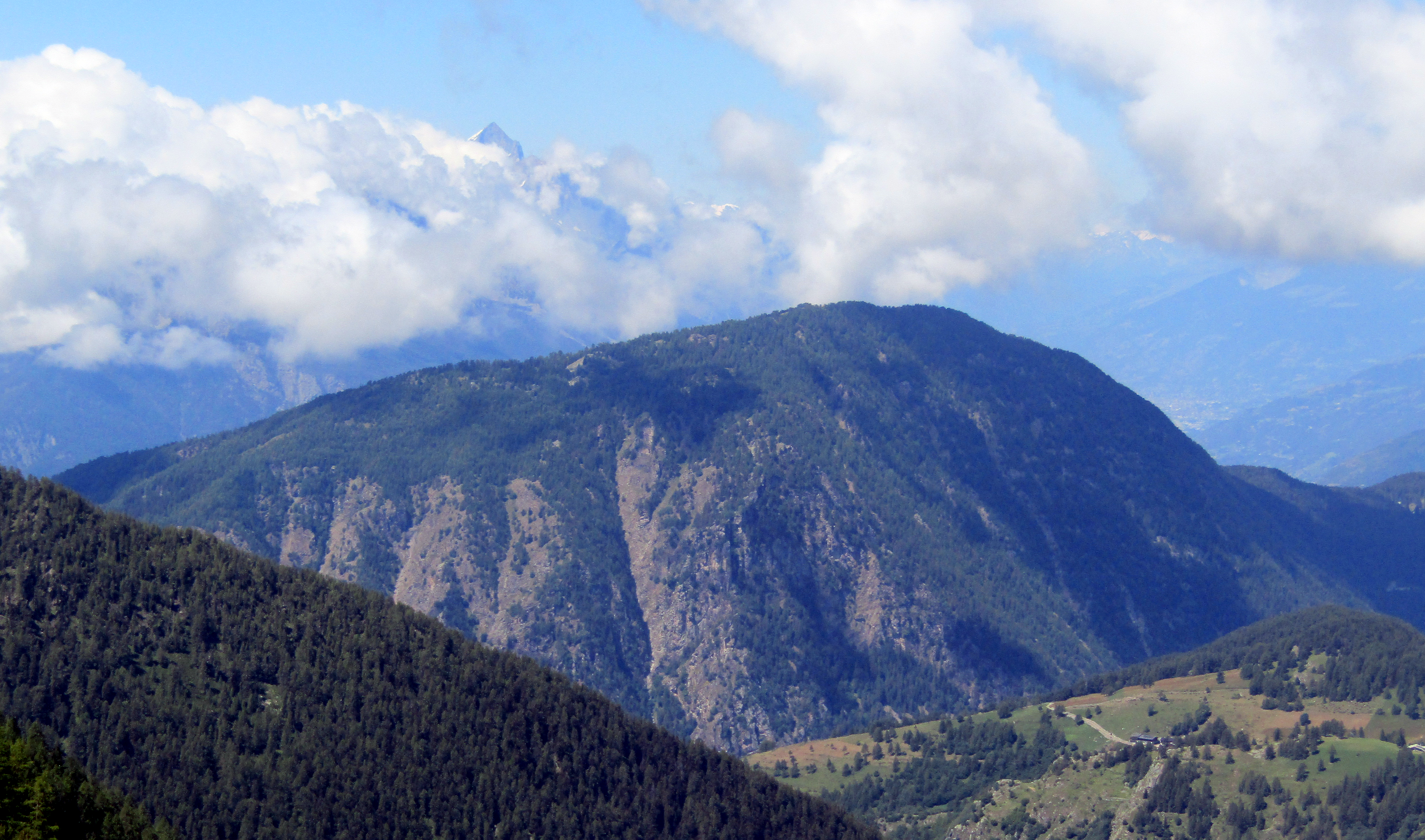
- Northern slopes of the mountain

Highest point
- Elevation: 2,106 m (6,909 ft)
- Prominence: 439 m (1,440 ft)Key col: Col de Joux (1640 m)
- Listing: Alpine mountains 2000-2499 m
- Coordinates: 45°44′41″N 7°43′20″E

Geography
- Location within Alps
- Location: Aosta Valley, Italy
- Parent range: Pennine Alps

Climbing
- Easiest route: Hike

The Testa di Comagna (French: Tête de Comagne) is a 2,106 metres high peak on the Italian side of the Pennine Alps.

== Geography ==
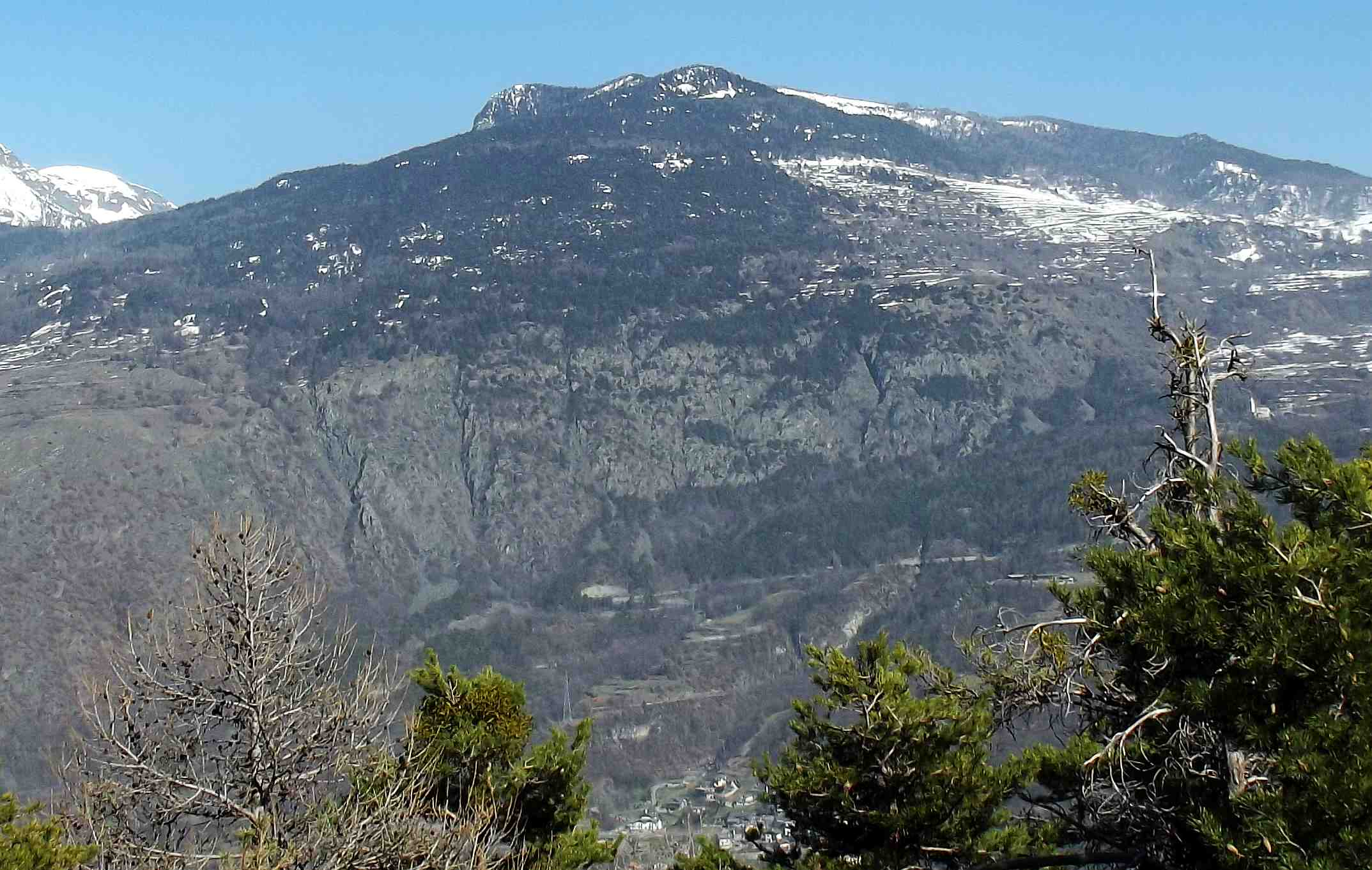
View from Rodoz.

The mountain is located on the water divide between the main Aosta Valley and the Val d'Ayas, one of its tributary valleys. The long stretch of the water divide linking towards NW the Testa di Comagna with monte Zerbion touches its lowest point with Col de Joux (1.640 m). In the opposite direction the water divide continues with the saddle of Col Tzecore (1.607 m}) and then rises up to the Mont d'Arbaz (1.651 m).

Close to the summit of the Testa di Comagna stands a summit cross, sustained by a masonry basement. The mountain, thanks to its central position in the Aosta Valley and its isolation from higher mountains, offers a very wide panorama including many of the main summits of the area such as Monte Emilius, Mont Néry, monte Bianco and Matterhorn.

=== SOIUSA classification ===
According to SOIUSA (International Standardized Mountain Subdivision of the Alps) the mountain can be classified in the following way:

- main part = Western Alps
- major sector = North Western Alps
- section = Pennine Alps
- subsection = Monte Rosa Alps
- supergroup =Contrafforti valdostani del Monte Rosa
- group = Costiera Tournalin-Zerbion
- code = I/B-9.III-B.4

== Access to the summit ==
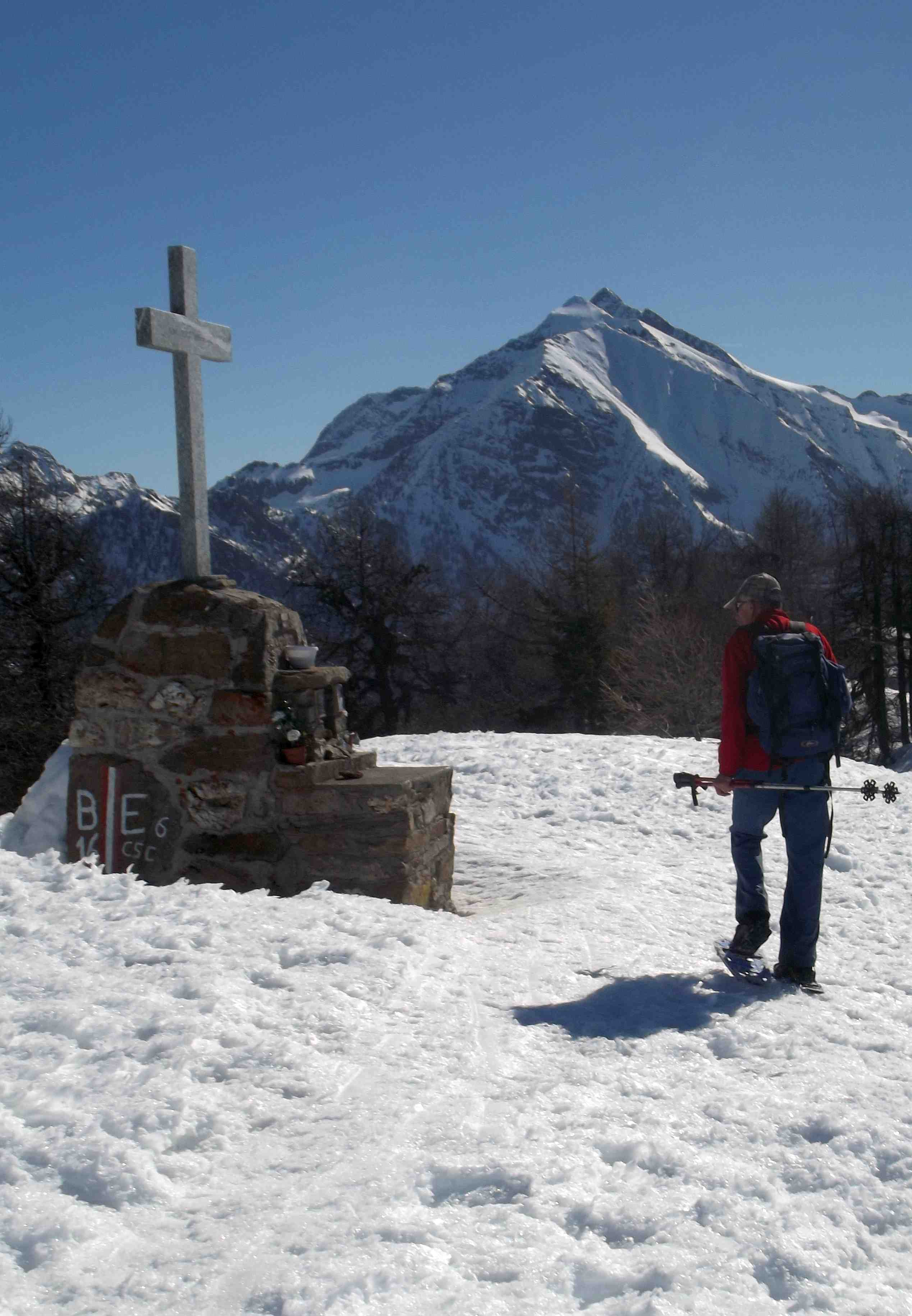
Sumit cross.

=== Summer ===
The mountain does not have special alpinistic interest but is a popular hiking destination because of its access and the panorama which offers on the Aosta Valley mountains. In order to reach the summit a good starting point is the col de Joux, but one can also start from Sommarèse or from Plésod. On the contrary reaching the summit by mountain bike requires good skills.

=== Winter ===
The Testa di Comagna is also a classical destination for Ski mountaineering, considered of medium difficulty. and hiking with snow shoes. Winter routes follow more or less the same itineraries used for summertime access to the summit.

== Maps ==
- Military Geographic Institute (IGM) official maps of Italy, 1:25.000 and 1:100.000 scale, on-line version
- Carta dei sentieri e dei rifugi scala 1:50.000 n. 5 Cervino e Monte Rosa, Istituto Geografico Centrale - Torino
