= Ernesto Pochintesta =

Italian painter (1840–1892)

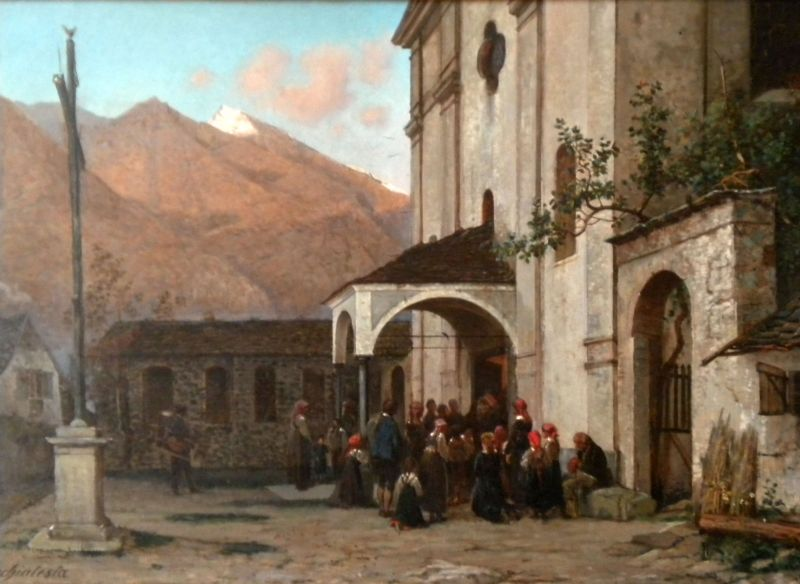

Ernesto Pochintesta (Stradella, Lombardy, Italy, January 18, 1840 – Turin, January 13, 1892) was an Italian painter, active as a landscape artist and watercolor painter in a Realist style.

== Biography ==
His parents were owners of farmland of some means; and were able to sponsor his education. He trained in Turin at the Accademia Albertina under Antonio Fontanesi. His colleagues were Carlo Pollonera, Vittorio Bussolino, Carlo Stratta, and Giovanni Piumati. In 1873, Pochintesta invested and was involved in the restoration of the Castle of Issogne belonging to Vittorio Avondo. In 1874, he became an associate in the Society of Acquafortisti. In 1875–77, he travelled to Paris, where Stratta, Pasquini, Pollonera, and Calandra had moved to; here he was influenced by Camille Corot. He was able to exhibit at the Salons of 1876 and 1877. However, he did not find great success in Paris. In 1880, he returned to Turin.

At Milan, in 1881, exhibited Un brutto incontro; at Turin, in 1884, Campagna ferrarese, at Venice, in 1887, another canvas titled: Arei campi. He married in 1887 a woman twenty years younger, however, because of failed investments, he died poor.
