= Isollaz Falls =

Coordinates: 45°41′05″N 7°42′41″E

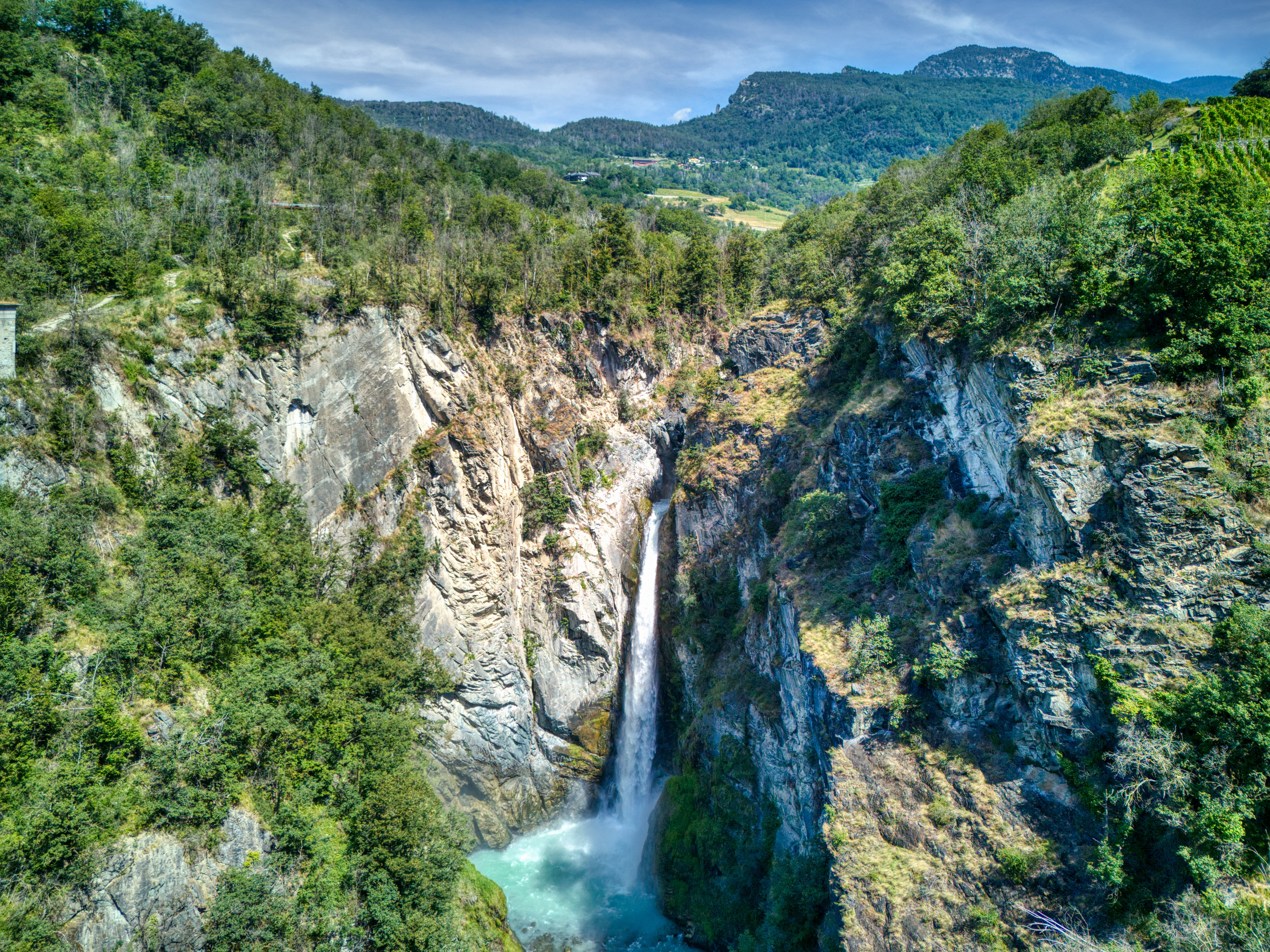
- Isollaz Falls in 2024
- Interactive map of Isollaz Falls
- Location: Challand-Saint-Victor, Italy
- Total height: 50 m (160 ft)
- Number of drops: 1

The Isollaz Falls (Italian: Cascata di Isollaz; French: Cascade d'Isollaz) is a waterfall along the Évançon river near Challand-Saint-Victor in the Aosta Valley, Italy. It has a drop of about 50 meters, making it one of the highest in the region.
