= Issogne Castle =

Castle in Issogne, in lower Aosta Valley

Coordinates: 45°39′19″N 7°41′19″E

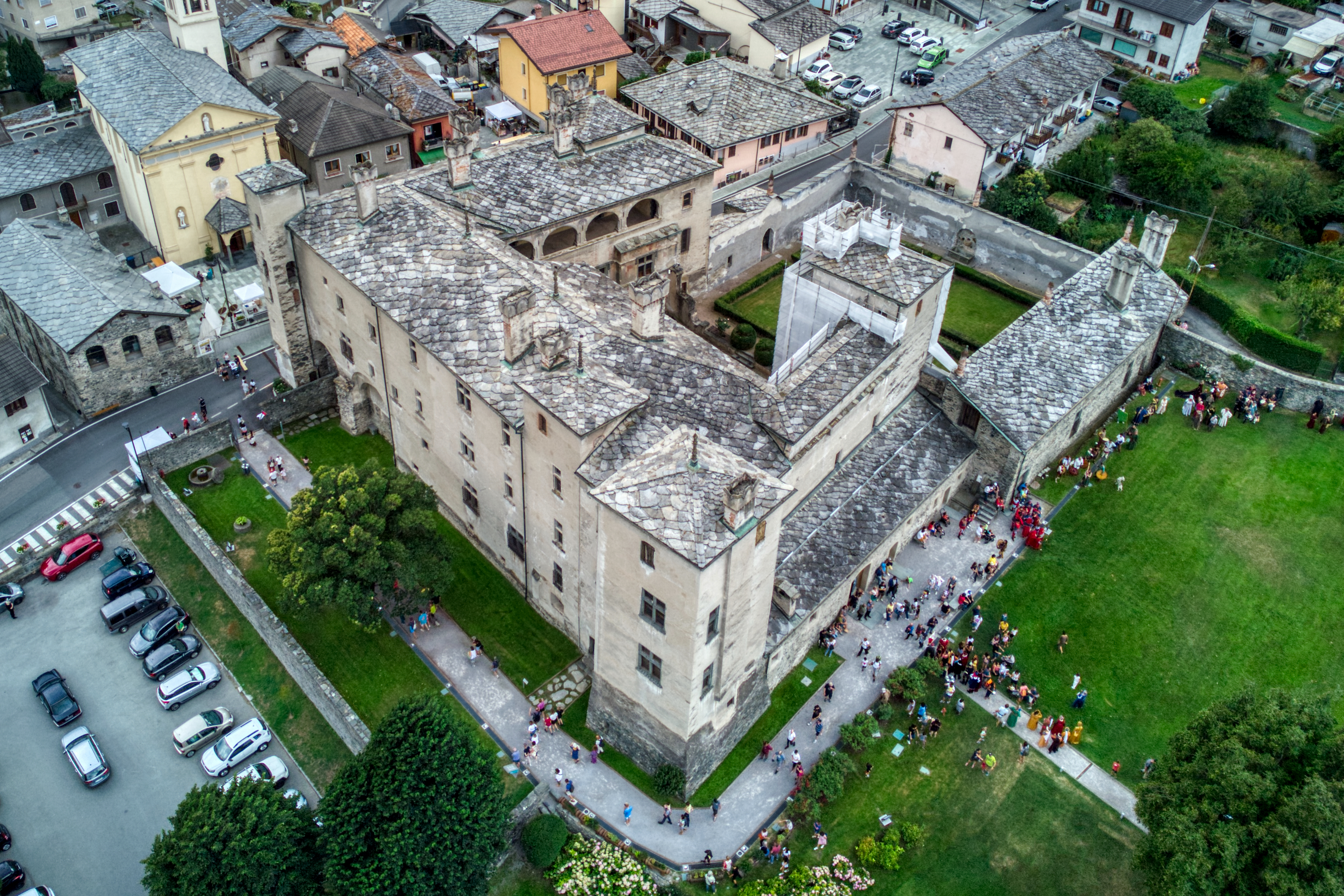
Issogne Castle

Issogne Castle is a castle in Issogne, in lower Aosta Valley, in northwestern Italy. It is one of the most famous manors of the region, and is located on the right bank of the Dora Baltea at the centre of the inhabited area of Issogne. As a seigniorial residence of the Renaissance, the Castle has quite a different look from that of the austere Verrès Castle, which is located in Verrès, on the opposite bank of the river.

Issogne Castle is most noteworthy for its fountain in the form of pomegranate tree and its highly decorated portico, a rare example of medieval Alpine painting, with its frescoed cycle of scenes of daily life from the late Middle Ages.

== History ==
=== Middle ages ===
The earliest mention of the castle of Issogne is in a papal bull issued by Pope Eugene III in 1151, which refers to a fortified building at Issogne, the property of the Bishop of Aosta. Some walling discovered in the cellars of the current castle may be evidence of a Roman villa, dating from the 1st century BC, on the site.

Tensions between the Bishop of Aosta and the De Verrecio family, lords of the nearby town of Verrès, reached boiling point around 1333, when the castle of Issogne, the episcopal seat, was attacked and damaged by fire. Issogne remained the seat of the bishop until 1379, when the bishop of Aosta submitted to the jurisdiction of the then lord of Verrès, Yblet of Challant. Ibleto transformed the episcopal stronghold into an elegant princely residence in Gothic style, with a series of towers and buildings enclosed by an encircling wall.

When Yblet died in 1409, the feud and castle of Issogne passed to his son Francis of Challant (French: François de Challant), who in 1424 received the title of Count of Challant from the Duke of Savoy. Francesco died in 1442, leaving no male heir. A long succession struggle between Francesco's daughter Catherine of Challant and her cousin James of Challant-Aymavilles (French: Jacques de Challant-Aymavilles) was won by James, who thus became the second Count of Challant and the new lord of Issogne.

=== Renaissance ===
From about 1480, further alterations were made to the Castle by James's son Luigi di Challant, and continued after his death in 1487 by his cousin, the prior George of Challant-Varey (French: Georges de Challant-Varey), to whom James's wife Marguerite de la Chambre had granted custody of his sons Philibert and Charles. George had new wings erected to connect the already existing buildings, unifying the complex into a single horseshoe shape surrounding a central courtyard. The decorations of the portico and the celebrated pomegranate fountain date to this period. The Castle hosted many illustrious guests, including the future emperor Sigismund of Luxemburg as he returned to Germany in 1414, and King Charles VIII of France in 1494.

Work on the Castle ended with the death of George of Challant in 1509. Philibert of Challant became the new lord of Issogne, and made the Castle a residence for himself, his wife Louise d'Aarberg and his son René of Challant, under whom the Castle reached its greatest splendour and hosted a rich and refined court.

=== Decline and rebirth ===
Renato di Challant left no male heir at his death in 1565. His possessions passed to Giovanni Federico Madruzzo, husband of René's daughter Isabelle, giving rise to an inheritance dispute between the Madruzzo family and Isabelle's cousins of the Challant family that lasted for more than a century. The lordship of Issogne and its Castle passed from the Madruzzo family to the Lenoncourt family, then in 1693 to Cristina Maurizia Del Carretto di Balestrina, and was finally returned to the Challant family in 1696.

In 1802, the last count of Challant, Giulio Giacinto, died, and the Challant family was extinguished. The Castle, already abandoned for some years, fell into decay and its furniture was removed. In 1872 the owner of the Castle, Baron Marius de Vautheleret, was forced to sell it at auction. It was acquired by the Turin painter Vittorio Avondo, who restored it, furnishing it with some of its original furniture bought back from the antique market, and with copies of furniture of the period. Avondo donated the Castle to the Italian state in 1907; in 1948 it passed to the Aosta Valley region.

The Castle may be visited by guided tour.

== Interior of the Castle ==
From the exterior, the Castle looks like a fortified residence of fairly unprepossessing appearance, without any particular decoration, with angular turrets a little higher than the rest of the building. The Castle is situated at the centre of the inhabited area of Issogne.

The Castle was built to a quadrangular plan, three sides of which are occupied by the building and the fourth, oriented towards the south, comprises an Italian Garden, enclosed within a surrounding wall.

=== The courtyard and portico ===
The internal courtyard, enclosed within the three sides of the building, and the garden form one of the most interesting spaces of the Castle. At one time, one reached this space by passing from the countryside through principal gate and under a portico. Today, for practical reasons, the secondary entrance on the west side is used. This entrance faces an expansive field.

On the facades that face the courtyard, one finds the so-called "Miroir pour les infants de Challant", a series of frescoed heraldic arms that show the diverse branches of the Challant family and the principal matrimonial alliances of the house. The "miroir" was created in order to preserve a record of the family history and to transmit it to future generations. The surrounding wall of the garden, on the other hand, was decorated with monochromatic images of legends and heroes of antiquity, now unfortunately almost entirely obliterated.

At the centre of the courtyard, one finds the celebrated 'pomegranate fountain'. From the octagonal stone bowl of the fountain emerges a pomegranate tree made of wrought iron from which jets of water are sprayed. Strangely, although the fruit of the tree is clearly to be understood as that of the pomegranate the leaves, perhaps for symbolic reasons intended by the artist, are those of another tree - the oak. George of Challant probably had the fountain constructed as a wedding gift for the wedding of his favourite, Philibert of Challant, when Philibert married Louise d'Aarberg in 1502. It appears that the tree is to be read symbolically as the expression of the desire to unite the fertility and unity of the family represented by the pomegranate, with its seed-filled fruit, with the strength and antiquity signified by the oak. Amongst the branches of the pomegranate-oak, and somewhat difficult to discern, tiny dragons have been inserted.

The east side of the courtyard is occupied by the portico with its round arches and cross-vaults. The principal entrance of the Castle opens onto this portico and the interior of the building is nowadays also reached from this portico. The geometric decoration of the ribbing of the cross-vaults is typical of the rate of the fifteenth century.

The lunettes of the portico are decorated with frescoes giving realistic and humorous depictions of scenes daily life and the trades of the period. They represent an important iconographic testament to life between the fifteenth and sixteenth centuries. The 'lunette of the guard house' shows some soldiers, accompanied by some prostitutes, seated at a table and intent on playing cards or tric-trac. Their weapons and armour (including cuirasses, crossbows and halberds) are hung up on a rack attached to the wall. In the 'lunette of the bakery', recently kneaded bread is being pushed into an oven; a butcher turns meat on a spit while a cat tries to steal it from him. In the 'lunette of the tailor's shop', pieces of cloth are measured and cut, while on the shelves of the rear of the apothecary's shop, numerous jars of herbs and other medicines are shown. The 'lunette of the market' shows a fruit and vegetable market busy with numerous customers and vendors dressed in costumes of the period. Lastly, in the 'lunette of the small goods seller's shop', some forms of the typical Fontina cheese are shown; these are considered to the oldest representations of this cheese.

Besides their æsthetic function, these frescoes probably have a celebratory function, and are probably intended to show the abundance and peace obtained in the region thanks to the leadership of the lord of the Castle. The entire cycle has been attributed to an artist known as 'maître Colin' due to a graffito in the 'lunette of the guard house' that identifies 'Magister Collinus' as the author of the work. The same artist is known as the author of some paintings in the chapel on the first floor of the Castle.

=== The ground floor ===
The Castle comprises a total of about fifty rooms, although only about ten of them may visited with the guided tour. A door in the portico leads to the dining room, roofed by a vault and furnished with nineteenth-century furniture that Vittorio Avondo had made on the basis of Renaissance models. The dining room was joined to the kitchen by means of a service-hatch. The kitchen is divided into two parts by a wooden grate, creating two distinct spaces probably originally intended for the preparation of different types of food. The larger space, adjacent to the dining room, is provided with a large fireplace and an oven, while the smaller part includes a fireplace of smaller dimensions and a sink.

On the northern side, next to the staircase that leads to the second floor, one finds the so-called 'hall of justice' or 'lower halls', the principal presentation space of the Castle. It is a large hall on a rectangular plan, with the walls completely covered in a fresco of a fictive loggia with columns of marble, alabaster and transparent crystal. Scenes of the hunt, courtly life and northern landscapes are represented. The cycle of decoration culminates with the judgement of Paris, in which the commissioner of the work, George of Challant, is actually represented as Paris. The frescoes of this hall, probably completed before the death of George of Challant in 1509, have been attributed to the Master of Wuillerine, an artist thought to have been of the Franco-Flemish school, as may be deduced from the presence in the landscapes of houses with sharply-pitched roofs and windmills of the type typical in northern Europe. The Master of Wuillerine is also the author of an "ex voto" for the collegiate church of Saint Ursus at Aosta. The ceiling is of wood with the trusses left exposed. Placed along the walls on the long sides of the hall are placed carved wooden stalls, nineteenth-century recreations of the late-Gothic originals conserved in the Turin City Museum of Ancient Art. The rear wall of the hall is pierced by a large stone fireplace decorated by a griffin and a lion that hold the arms of the Challant family aloft.

The other rooms of the ground floor, which may not be visited, house the dispensary of the Castle, service rooms for the use of the kitchen (including a small goods store), the prisoner, the room reserved for the use of pilgrims, and rooms for the falconer, the guards, as well as other service rooms.

=== The first floor ===
The first floor of the Castle contains the rooms of the lords of the manor. They were also adapted by Vittorio Avondo when he acquired the Castle in the 19th century to his own personal use. One reaches this floor by means of a stone spiral staircase adjoining the 'hall of justice'. The same spiral staircase also provides access to the rooms of the ground floor as well as directly to the courtyard. The staircase if formed from a series of stone steps of trapezoidal shape. The wider part of the step is immured into the wall and the narrower part finished with a cylindrical element. Overlapping vertically in a series of steps, these cylindrical elements form a central column that give the staircase a significant static strength. The ceiling of the ramp is created by leaving the lower surface of the upper steps exposed, thus giving the appearance of a continuous ribbon that draws one on as one ascends the staircase.

One of the first rooms that one encounters as one climbs the staircase is the so-called 'chamber of Marguerite de la Chambre'. This was the private room first of Marguerite de la Chambre, wife of Luigi of Challant, and then of Mencia de Bragança, the wife of René of Challant. The room is covered by a wooden ceiling with exposed trusses. At the top of the wall, and located in the spaces between the exposed trusses, a frieze showing Marguerite's arms can be found. The furnishings of the room include a large stone fireplace and a canopied bed, a nineteenth-century copy of an original to be found in the Ussel Castle.

Next to the bedchamber can be found the private oratory of Marguerite de la Chambre, a small square room covered by a cross vault. This oratory is entirely covered in fresco, with scenes showing the Assumption of the Virgin, the martyrdom of St Catherine and St Margaret. One of these frescoes shows Marguerite herself praying in the company of her two daughters-in-law and her three sons. The entire cycle was repainted in 1936.

Next to Marguerite's room, and accessible either through it or by means of the staircase, is the large rectangular hall covered with a wooden ceiling called the 'chambre de Savoie' (the Savoy Chamber) in the inventory compiled at the death of Renato di Challant in 1565. At the back of this hall there is a large stone fireplace upon which are depicted the arms of the Savoy family, after which the room was originally named, and the united arms of the Challand and La Palud families, brought together by virtue of the wedding of Amadeus of Challant-Varey and Anne de La Palud, parents of the Prior George of Challant. The furnishings of this room reflect its organisation in the nineteenth century by Vittorio Avondo, who displayed his collection of antique arms and armour him; for this reason, the room has been called the 'hall of arms'. Completing the furnishing of the room is a series of pieces of furniture that are nineteenth-century copies of Late Gothic originals.

The last space that may be visited on the first floor is the chapel, situated in the eastern wing of the Castle, above the portico of the courtyard. This is a long and narrow room, covered by a series of cross-vaults that divide the space into five bays. A wooden railing divides the room into two spaces, thus probably separating the lords of the manner from their services. The wooden stalls in this room, placed against the wall, are nineteenth-century copies that Vittorio Avondo had made, while the winged altar is original to the Castle, having been made at the start of the sixteenth century. Avondo bought this altar back on the antique market after it had been sold by the previous proprietors of the manor. The wings of the polyptych and the frescoes of the chapel, showing scenes of the Nativity, the Prophets, the Apostles and the Doctors of the Church, have been attributed to Maître Colin, the same artist who created the lunettes of the portico in the courtyard and who had worked on the decoration of the collegiate church of Saint Ursus in Aosta, of which George of Challant was prior.

Among the spaces that cannot be visited on the guided tour there are the private rooms of René of Challant, of his daughters Philiberte and Isabelle, of Cardinal Cristoforo Madruzzo (uncle of Giovanni Federico Madruzzo, the husband of Isabella di Challant) and their antechambers and access spaces.

=== The second floor ===
The second floor is reached by continuing to ascend the stone spiral staircase. Corresponding to the rooms of Marguerite de la Chambre we find those spaces reserved to George of Challant. One of George's rooms, also known as the 'Chambre de Saint Maurice' because of the coffered ceiling, the coffers of which contain the cross of the Order of Cavaliers of Saint Maurice, is furnished in a way corresponding to the furnishings of Marguerite's room underneath it. The room features a canopied bed of the sixteenth century and a credenza and a commode made in the nineteenth century at the direction of Avondo but in the late Gothic style. The room is warmed by a large stone fireplace decorated with the arms of George of Challant upheld by a griffin and a lion.

From the room of George of Challant, one enters his private oratory, located again in correspondence to that of Marguerite. This, too, is a small space on a quadrangular plan, covered with a cross vault and completely frescoed. The frescoes, the work of the same anonymous Northern artist who decorated Marguerite's chapel, show the scene of the crucifixion, a pietà, and the entombment of Christ. George, the commissioner of the work, is depicted kneeling at the foot of the cross. As with many other paintings in the manor, the frescoes of George's oratory were repainted during a restoration in 1936.

From the principal staircase, one reaches the so-called 'Hall of the King of France', situated next to the rooms of George of Challant and over the 'hall of arms'. Its name would seem to have derived from probably having been the room in which Charles VIII of France stayed during his passage through Italy in 1494. In the sixteenth century, this was the wedding chamber of René of Challant and his wife Mencia.

The room is covered by a coffered ceiling and is warmed by a fireplace decorated with the lilies of the royal arms of France. The room is furnished with furniture in part bought back by Avondo, as for example the canopied bed with the arms of the Challant-Aymavilles branch acquired from a peasant in Ussel, and in part by nineteenth-century reconstructions.

Passing through the room of the King of France and through a series of access rooms, one reaches the 'Chamber of the Tower', situated in the north-west corner of the manor in the most ancient part of the Castle. The different windows of the room permitted a view of the Castles of Arnad and Verrès as well as of the Villa Castle in Challand. This space was probably used as a signalling tower. In case of danger, the lords of manor would have been able to take securer refuge in the more easily defended Verrès Castle.

To reach the last room that can be visited on this floor, it is necessary to pass through a loggia covered with a cross vault. This last room is located at the south-west extremity of the Castle. In an inventory of 1565, it is called the 'Chamber of the Emperor', probably in honour of the stay of the Emperor Sigismond of Luxemburg in 1414. The room is now called the 'Chamber of the Little Countess' in honour of the countess Isabelle of Challant, the daughter of René of Challant and Mencia de Bragança. It is furnished with a sixteenth-century bed of Tyrolese origin, reconstructed furniture commissioned by Avondo in the nineteenth century and a stone fireplace decorated with the arms of George of Challant.

In the eastern wing of the Castle, which may not be visited, one finds a loggia roofed with a cross vault and positioned in a location corresponding to the chapel, some rooms and access spaces, and the stairs that lead to the roof of the castle. According to a legend, the ghost of Bianca Maria Gaspardone would appear on the roof on moonlit nights. Gaspardone was the first wife of René of Challant. Gaspardone abandoned her marriage René after only some months, having become tired of the long absences of her husband. She was subsequently condemned to death for procuring the assassination of her former lover Ardizzino Valperga by Don Pietro di Cardona, her then current lover; she was executed at Milan in 1526.

=== The graffiti ===
One of the characteristic features of the Issogne Castle, apart from the famous frescoes and the pomegranate fountain, is the numerous graffiti that have been left in the course of centuries by visitors to and guests of the Castle, the servants and lords of the manor themselves. These graffiti have been preserved because the Castle has never undergone major change, and they provide valuable evidence about daily life in the Castle. These graffiti, usually incised on the walls, are present throughout the Castle but in particular are visible in the portico of the courtyard, in the corridors, and in the embrasures of the doors and windows.

The graffiti are mostly in French or Latin, and amongst them one finds visitors' reflections on how sad or happy they are to be leaving the Castle, a great number about life or money, confessions of being in love, and mocking jibes. The frescoed lunettes of the portico show, in addition to the signature of the painter Master Colin, comments on one or other of the professions depicted, while in the gallery that leads from the 'Chamber of the Little Countess', one may read an epitaph for the death of Count René de Challant ('XI julii 1565/obiit Renatus/comes de Challant', i.e. 'On the 11th of July 1565, René, count of Challant, died') and expressions of sadness on the occasion of the anniversary of that date.

== See also ==
- George of Challant
