= Vittorio Avondo =

Italian antiquarian and painter

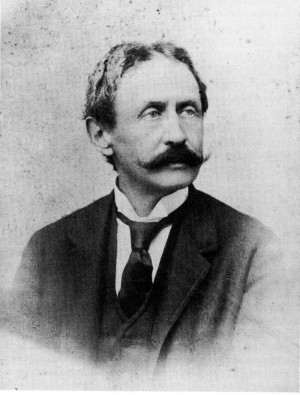
Vittorio Avondo (c.1890)

Vittorio Avondo (August 10, 1836 – December 14, 1910) was an Italian antiquarian and painter born in Turin, where he served as a member of the city council. In his painting, he depicted mainly landscapes from his native Piedmont. He is considered one of the painters of the School of Rivara, which included Carlo Pittara.

== Biography ==
Son of a docent at the college of Law at the University of Turin, he trained in painting in Tuscany, Switzerland and France. In Switzerland, he studied under Alexandre Calame. He worked briefly for a commission associated with the Bargello in Florence.

Returning to Turin in 1861, he became a city councillor. In 1883, he was appointed to the commission responsible for selecting works for the Civic Museum. In 1872, he bought the Issogne Castle in Valle d’Aosta. With the help of Alfredo d'Andrade, Giuseppe Giacose, and Ernesto Pochintesta, he restored the castle. In 1882, he helped restore the medieval neighborhood in Turin. He also worked to help restore Emanuele Tapparelli d’Azeglio's Casa Cavassa in Saluzzo. In 1890 he replaced Tapparelli d’Azeglio as director of the Museo Civico. Avondo died in Turin in 1910.
