= Mont Néry =

Mountain in Italy

- Töitschu: Neryschthuare
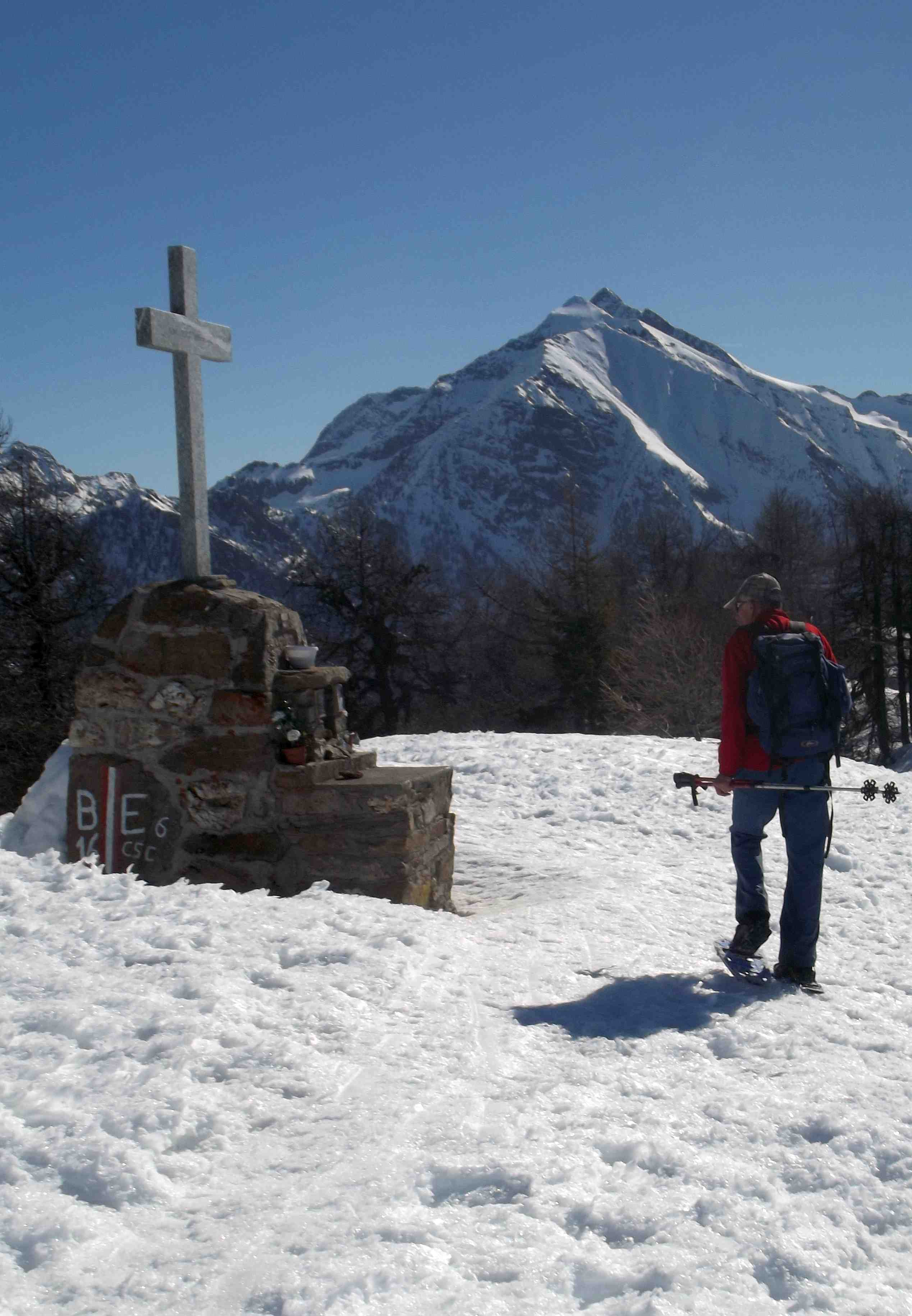
- Mont Néry from the Testa di Comagna

Highest point
- Elevation: 3,075 m (10,089 ft)
- Prominence: 906 m (2,972 ft)
- Listing: Alpine mountains above 3000 m
- Coordinates: 45°43′00″N 7°49′09″E

Geography
- Location within Alps
- Location: Aosta Valley, Italy
- Parent range: Pennine Alps

Climbing
- First ascent: 1873

Mont Néry (in Töitschu Neryschthuare - 3,075m) is a mountain of the Pennine Alps in Aosta Valley, northwestern Italy.

== Features ==
The mountain si located between the Ayas Valley and the Lys Valley. It is the highest summit of the Frudière Range, part of the larger Monte Rosa Massif. The mountain is formed from a mixture of gneiss and schist rocks. It was first climbed in 1873.
