= Casa Cavassa =

Renaissance-style palazzo in Piedmont, Italy

Coordinates: 44.64449°N 7.48601°E

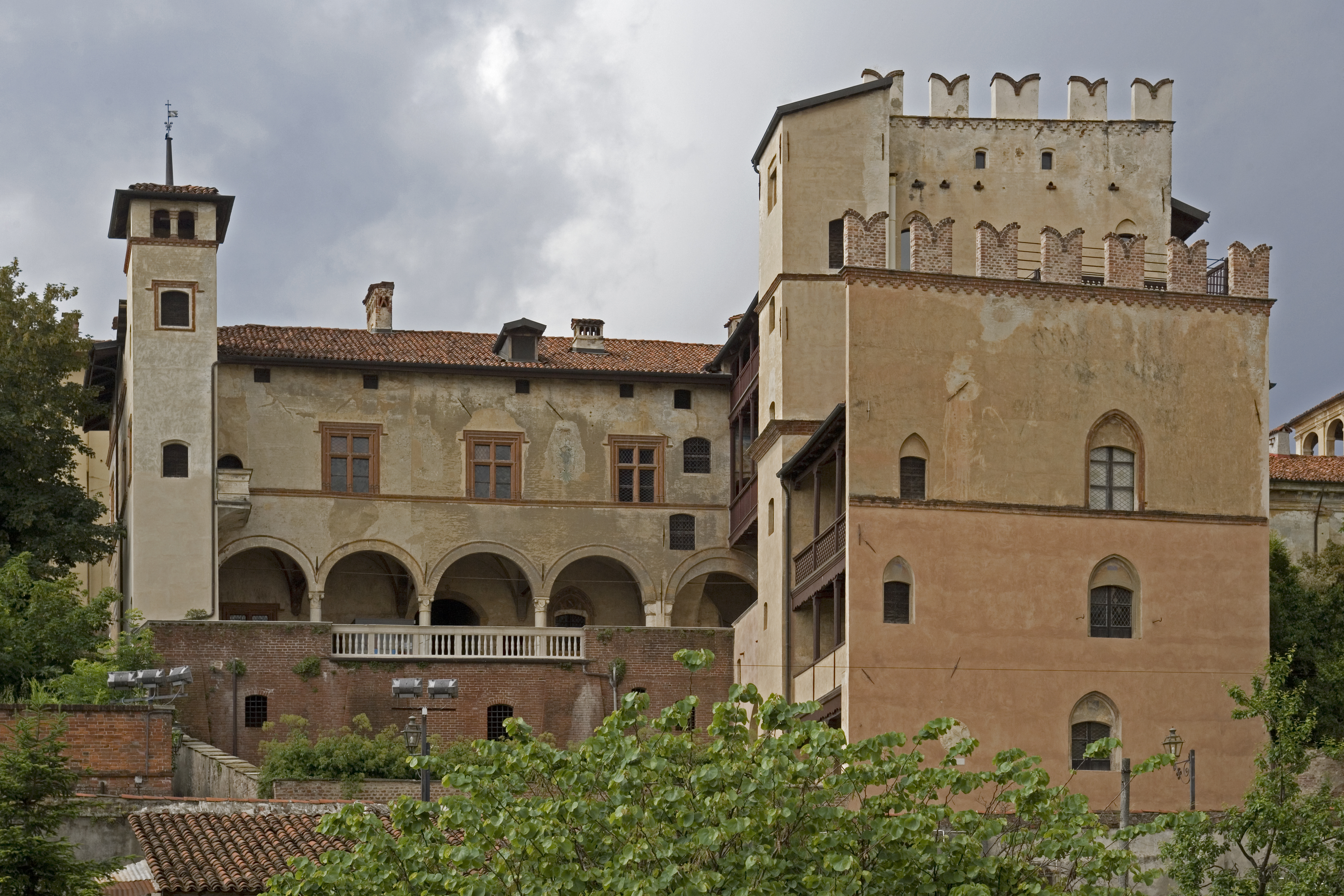

Casa Cavassa is a Renaissance-style palazzo in Saluzzo, region of Piedmont, Italy, and the site of the city's museum, the Museo Civico Casa Cavassa. It is situated in the San Martino village.

== History ==
Casa Cavassa was the residence of Galeazzo Cavassa and his son Francesco, members of a family (ennobled in 1460) native of Carmagnola and both general vicars of the marquisate of Saluzzo. Traces of a building dating back to the Middle Ages can be found in the basements and in the ogival windows of the façade overlooking Via San Giovanni. Since 1505 it became ownership of Francesco, vicar first during the rule of Ludovico II of Saluzzo (died 1504) and then during the Marguerite of Foix’s regency.

Francesco Cavassa refurbished the building in a Renaissance style based on the new trends of the contemporary Padan area. After the restoration and enlargement, the layout took the semblance of an L, with the bodies joined by spiral stairs. The edifice took advantage of the sloping ground in order to extend over six floors, three underground included kitchens, cellars and servants’ rooms, while the reception halls and the private apartments were on the upper floors.

A rapid dilapidation started when Francesco, hostile to the new Marquis Giovanni Ludovico, was confined for political reasons and died a violent death. The edifice remained to the Cavassa heirs until the 18th century; later the house was divided into private apartments and the deterioration of the structures increased.

In 1883 the edifice was purchased by Marquis Emanuele Tapparelli d’Azeglio (nephew of the writer Massimo), a cosmopolitan diplomat, a lover of art and antiques. The Marquis entrusted Vittorio Avondo (painter, collector and future director of the Museums of Turin) and the engineer Melchiorre Pulciano with the restoration. They tried to recover the Renaissance appearance of the edifice, supported by numerous workshops located in Saluzzo and following the principle known as "completion according to style": eliminated of what was considered irrelevant and addition of what thought to be necessary in a 16th-century maison.

For the fitting out of the chambers, which had been deprived of their original furnishings during the pillages following Francesco Cavassa's death, many objects of art were acquired, some documenting the Cavassa family, others dating back to the 15th or 16th century and coming from the antique market or bestowed by collectors. Then, in order to complete the decor, the Marquis commissioned creation of pieces of furniture which could reproduce Renaissance and late Gothic works of art.

At Tapparelli d'Azeglio's death in 1890, the municipality inherited the edifice and opened it to the public the following year. The present arrangement, as far as possible, replicates one projected by Marquis Tapparelli, which was recreated on the basis of the inventory drawn up by the notary Gullino in 1890 (after the Marquis' death) and according to some photographs taken at the end of the 19th century restoration works. Later some important works of art have been added to the Tapparelli collection.
