= Ussel =

Ussel may refer to:

== France ==
- Ussel, Cantal
- Ussel, Corrèze
  - Ussel station
- Ussel, Lot
- Ussel-d'Allier, Allier
- Arrondissement of Ussel, Corrèze
- Canton of Ussel, Corrèze
- Ussel, part of Le Brignon, Haute-Loire
- Ussel, part of Vensat, Puy-de-Dôme

== Germany ==
- Ussel (river), of Bavaria

== Italy ==
- Ussel Castle, Châtillon

== See also ==
- d'Ussel, a surname
