= Ussel Castle =

Castle in Aosta Valley, Italy

- Castello di Ussel (Italian); Château d'Ussel (French)
- Ussel, Aosta Valley, Italy
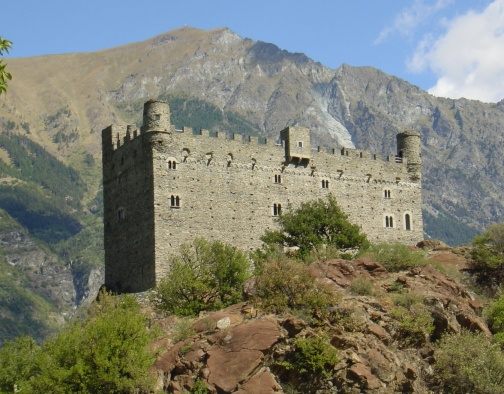
- Ussel Castle in 2009

Site information
- Type: Castle

Location
- Location within Italy
- Coordinates: 45°44′29.6″N 7°37′42.6″E

Ussel Castle (Italian: Castello di Ussel, French: Château d'Ussel) is a castle located in Ussel, Châtillon, Aosta Valley, Aosta Valley, Italy.

== History ==
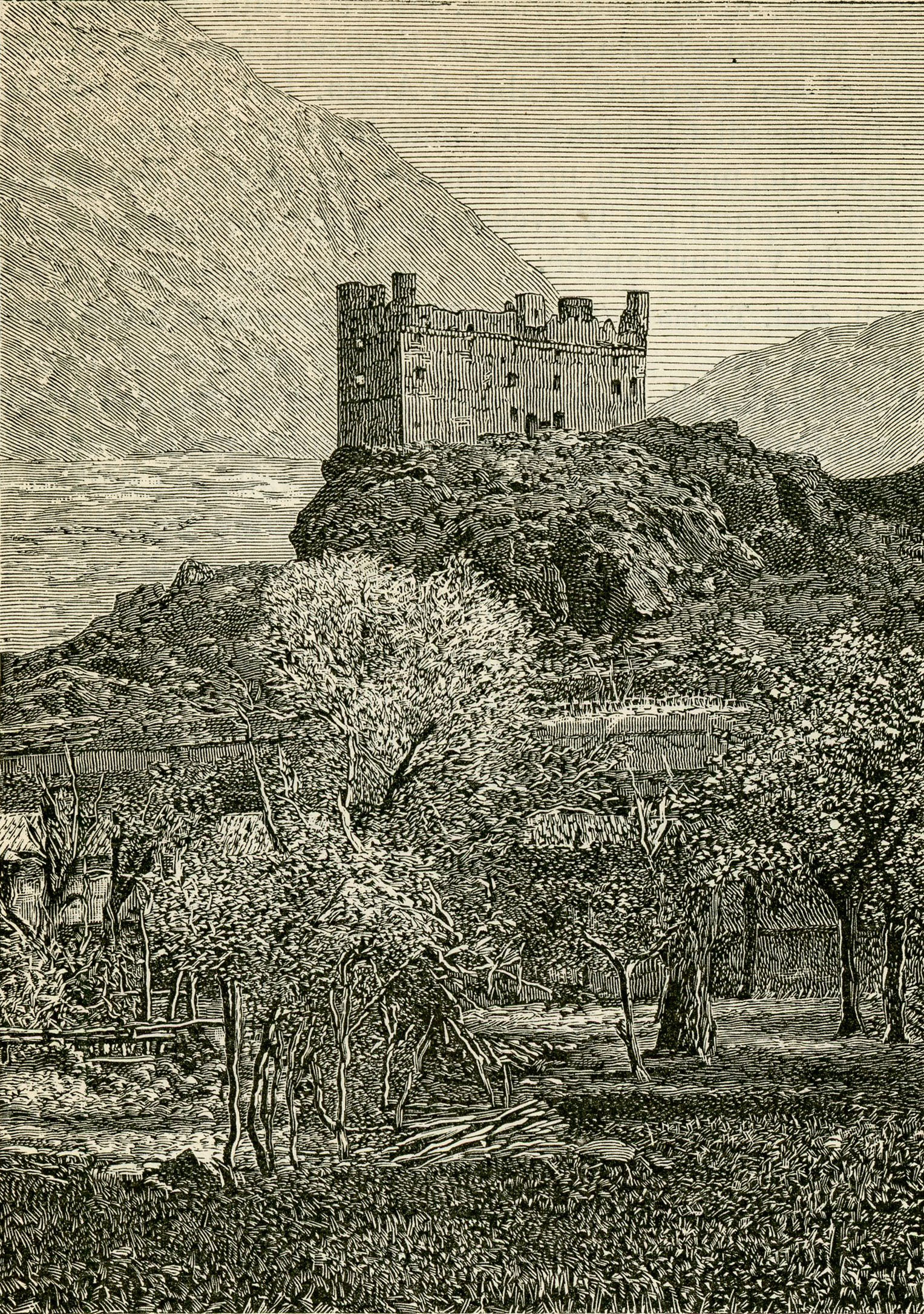
Late 19th century woodcut

The castle was built from the ground up by Ébal II of Challant starting in 1343, following a long and complex inheritance dispute that arose within the Challant family after the death of Ébal the Great. When Ébal the Great died in 1323, he named as his heirs his four sons Pierre, Jacques, Boniface, and Jean, as well as the two sons of his eldest son, Godefroy, who had predeceased him. Under the terms of his will, his grandsons Ébal II and Aymon were to receive half of the entire estate. A settlement was finally reached in 1337, when Ébal the Great's sons recognized Aimone's rights to the fief of Fénis and granted Ébal II the fiefs of Saint-Marcel and Ussel.

Ébal II was also granted the right to build a castle at Ussel, although construction could not begin until six years after the agreement, in 1343. Over the following centuries, the castle shared the fate of many other strongholds in the Aosta Valley. In 1470, after the death of François of Challant, the last lord of Ussel, it was converted into a prison and military barracks before eventually falling into disuse.

Following the extinction of the Challant family in 1846, the castle, together with the family's other local estates, passed to the Passerin d'Entrèves family, who ultimately donated it to the Aosta Valley Autonomous Region in 1983. Restoration work began five years later and was completed in 1999, thanks to funding from Marcel Bich, the industrialist from Châtillon renowned worldwide as the creator of the iconic Bic ballpoint pen. In accordance with Bich's wishes, the castle now serves as a venue for exhibitions celebrating the art and culture of the Aosta Valley.

== Gallery ==
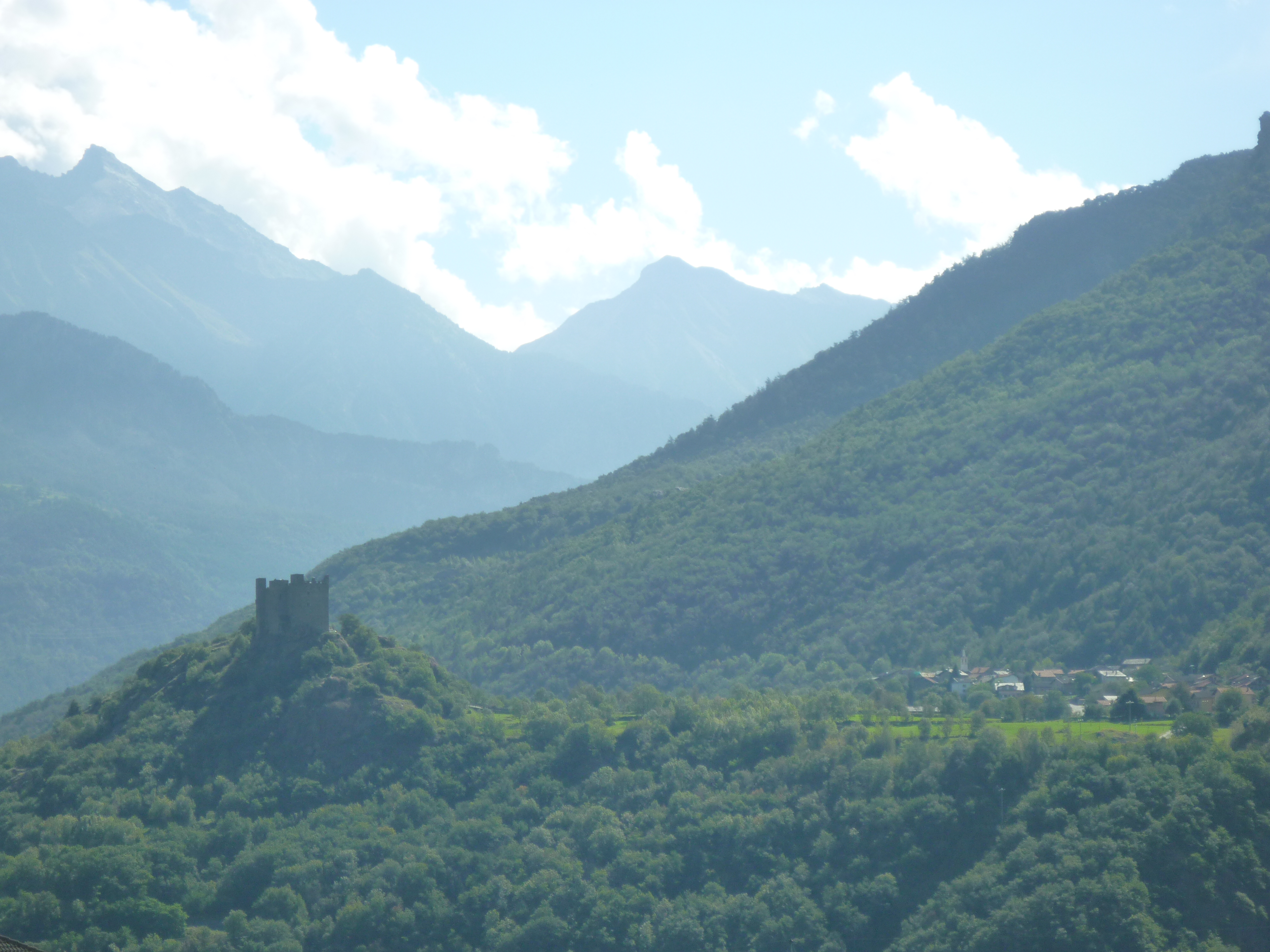

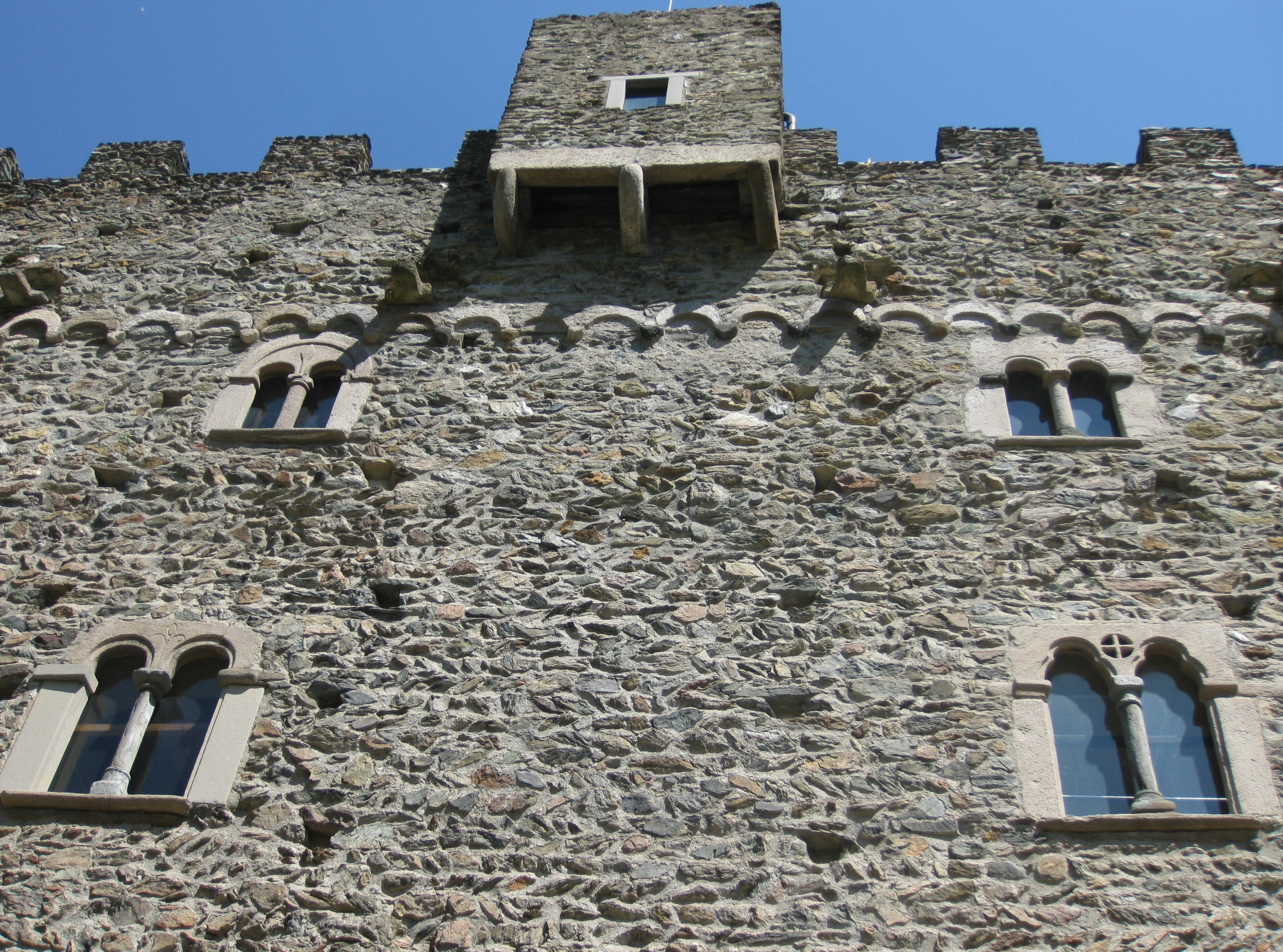

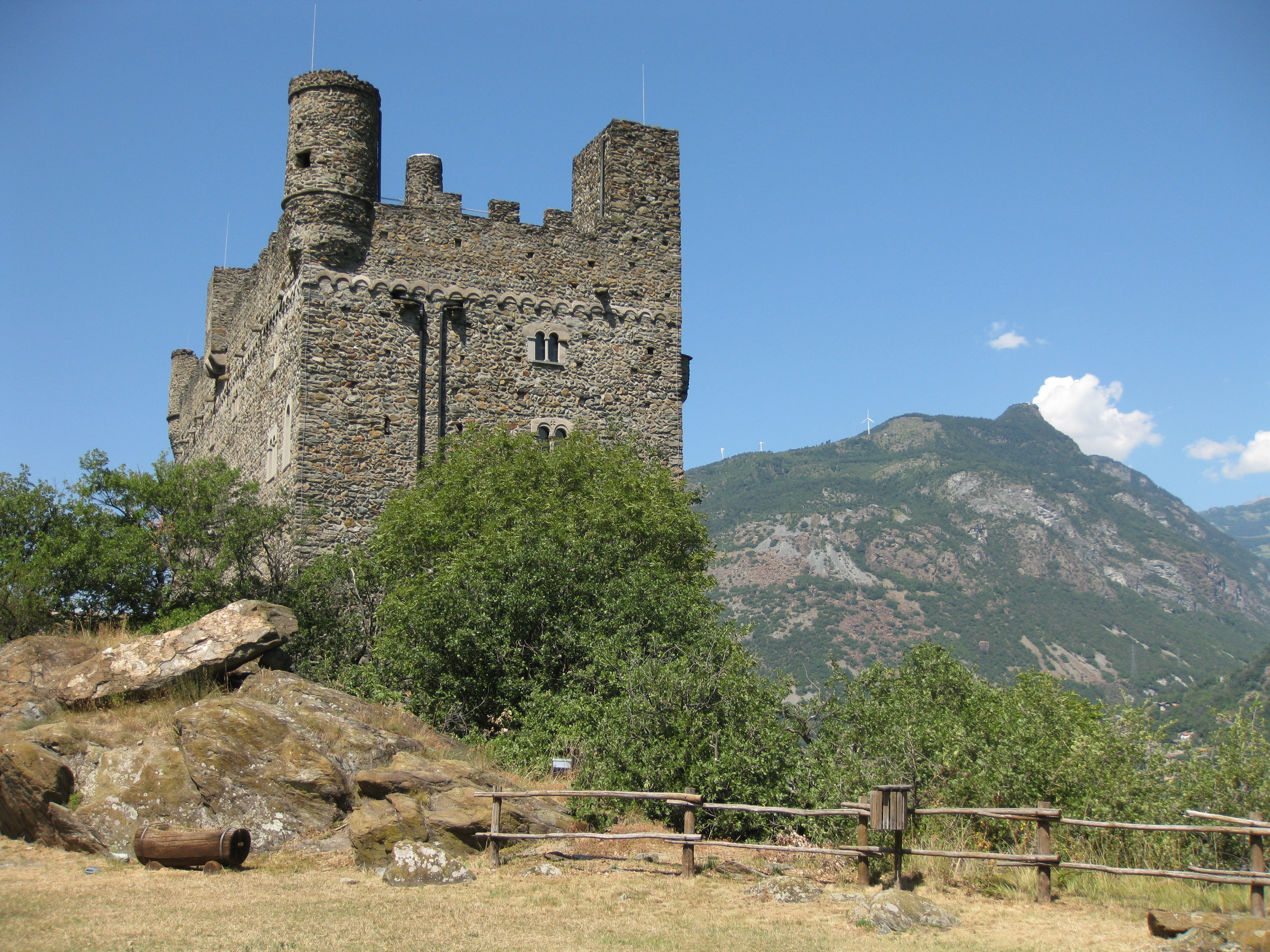
