= Montjovet =

Montjovet Mondzouèt / Mondjouèt (Valdôtain)
- Comune
- Comune di Montjovet; Commune de Montjovet
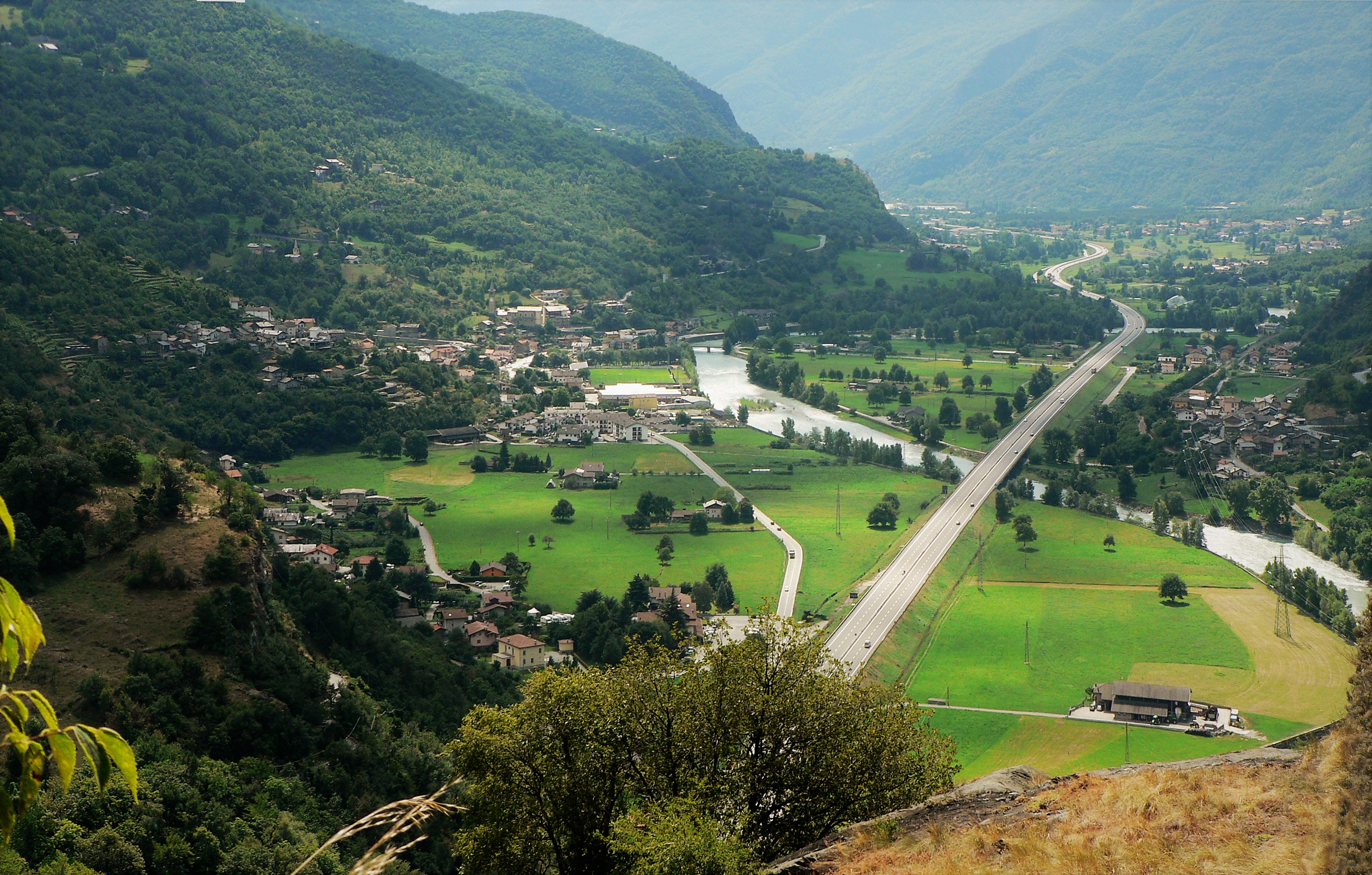
- The municipality of Montjovet seen from the Mont-Saint-Germain.

- Coat of arms

- Location within Italy Location within Aosta Valley
- Coordinates: 45°42′N 7°41′E
- Country: Italy
- Region: Aosta Valley
- Province: none
Frazioni / Hameaux
Frazioni	Les Balmes, Barmachande, Barmataz, Berger, Berriat (chef-lieu), Le Bourg, Brocard, Le Brun, Chambis, Champérioux, Champ-Sitirou, Chenal, Chénoz, Chosaley, Ciséran, Le Creston, Croux, Devin, Estaod, Fénillettaz, Fiusey, Fornet, Gaspard, Gettaz, Guat, Le Grand-Hoël, Janton, Laval, Le Laveché, Lillaz, Lorial, Méran, Montat, Montquert, Muret, Oley, Plangerp, Perral, Le Petit-Hoël, Le Petit-Monde, Plout, Le Provaney, Quignonat, Reclou, Rodoz, Ros, Ruelle, Saint-Germain, Tavernaz, Toffoz, Traversière, Le Tron, Verval, Vianad, Vignolaz

Area
  - Total: 18.7 km^{2} (7.2 sq mi)
- Elevation: 406 m (1,332 ft)

Population (31 December 2022)
  - Total: 1,754
  - Density: 93.8/km^{2} (243/sq mi)
- Demonym: Montjouvains
- Time zone: UTC+1 (CET)
  - Summer (DST): UTC+2 (CEST)
- Postal code: 11020
- Dialing code: 0166
- ISTAT code: 7043
- Saint day: 8 September
- Website: Official website

Montjovet (French: [mɔ̃ʒɔvɛ]; Valdôtain: Mondzouèt) is a comune in the lower Aosta Valley region of north-western Italy. Though it only has an area of 18.7 square kilometers, the commune has several villages and hamlets. The highest point is mont Lyan (2174 metres).

== History ==
The parish of Montjovet was mentioned as being under the control of the Bishop of Aosta in Pope Alexander III's ecclesia sancti Eusebii de Plubeio of 20 April 1176. In the 13th century, a massive landslide altered a lot of the terrain in the commune, destroying the original parish church. It was ceded in 1433 to the provost of Saint-Gilles of Verrès, which it remained under until the mid 18th century when it was returned to Borso.

== Landmarks ==
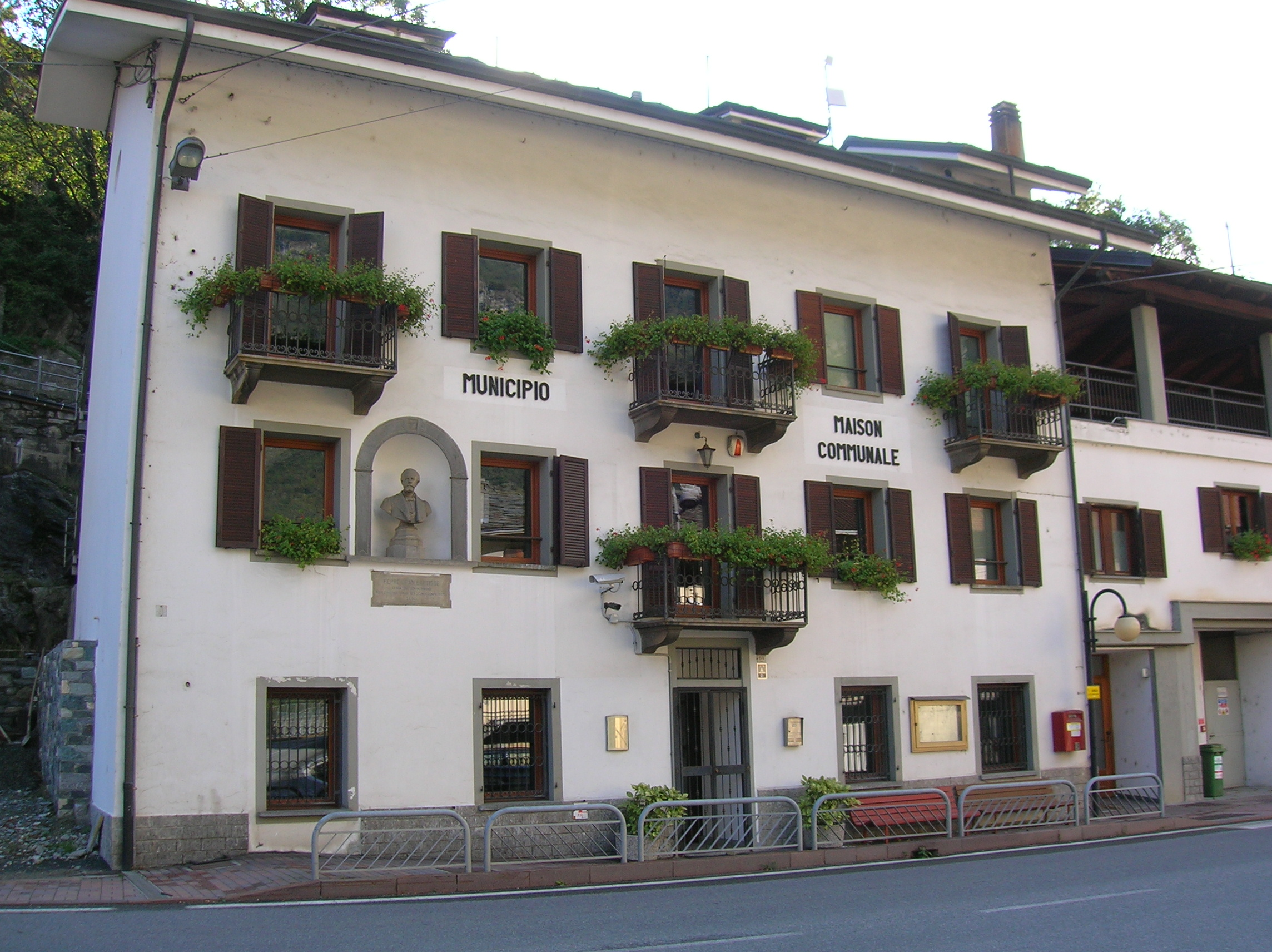
The Town Hall

- Saint-Germain castle
- Chenal tower
