= Issogne =

Issogne Issoueugne (Valdôtain) Issinji (Walser)
- Comune
- Comune di Issogne; Commune d'Issogne
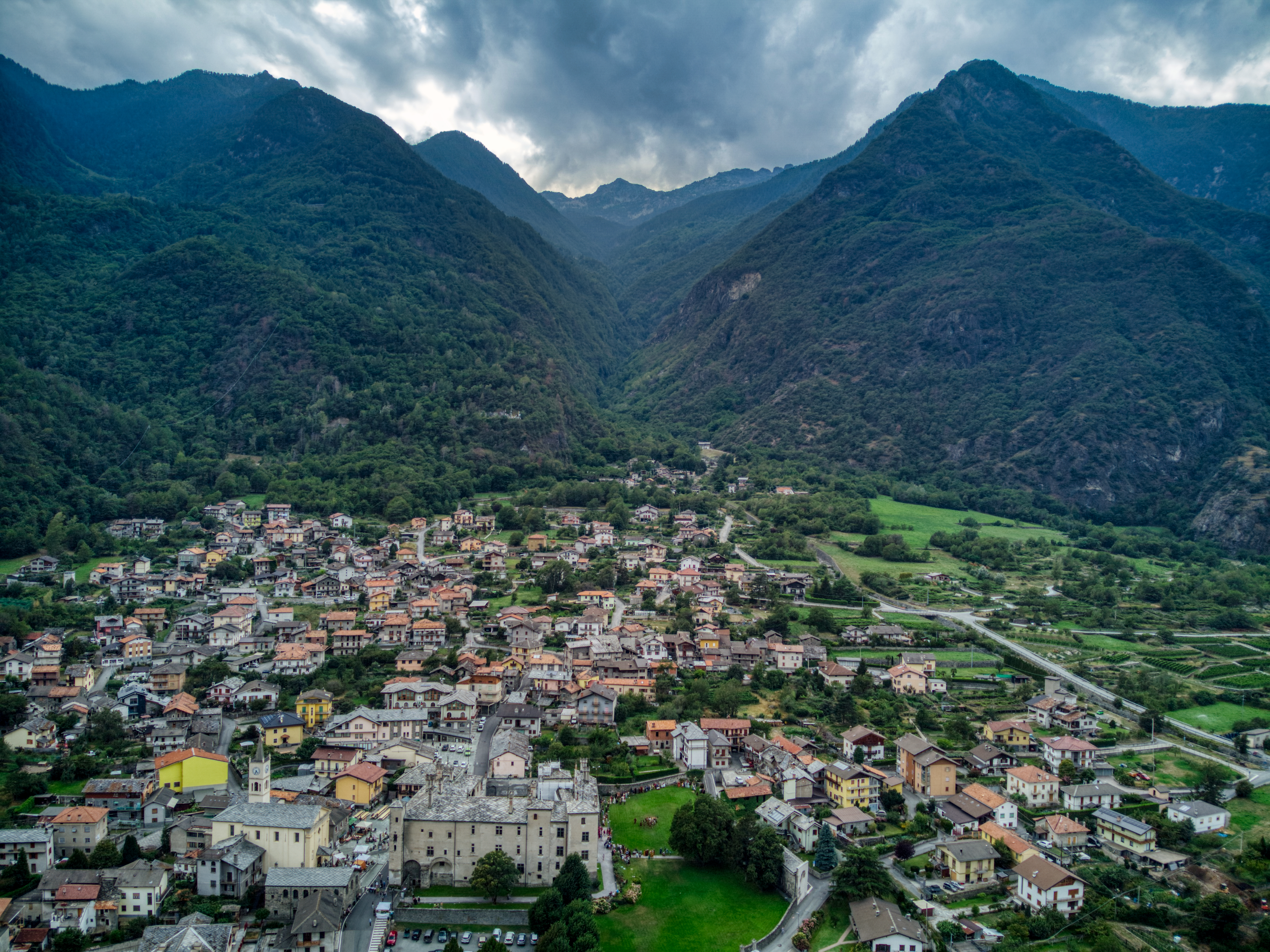

- Location within Italy Location within Aosta Valley
- Coordinates: 45°39′N 7°41′E
- Country: Italy
- Region: Aosta Valley
- Province: none
- Frazioni: Barmet, Clapeyas, Favad, Fleuran, Follias, La Colombière, La Place, La Ronchaille Dessous, La Ronchaille Dessus, Les Garines, Les Genot, Les Magaret, Les Mariette, Les Magot, Les Perruchon, Mure, Pied-de-ville, Sommet-de-ville

Area
  - Total: 23.61 km^{2} (9.12 sq mi)
- Elevation: 387 m (1,270 ft)

Population (31 December 2022)
  - Total: 1,301
  - Density: 55.10/km^{2} (142.7/sq mi)
- Demonym(s): Issognesi (Italian); Issogneins (French)
- Time zone: UTC+1 (CET)
  - Summer (DST): UTC+2 (CEST)
- Postal code: 11020
- Dialing code: 0125
- ISTAT code: 7037
- Patron saint: Assumption of Mary
- Saint day: 15 August
- Website: Official website

Issogne (French: [isɔɲ]; Valdôtain: Issoueugne; töitschu Walser: Issinji) is a town and comune in the Aosta Valley region of north-western Italy. It has 1422 residents and it is known for Issogne Castle.

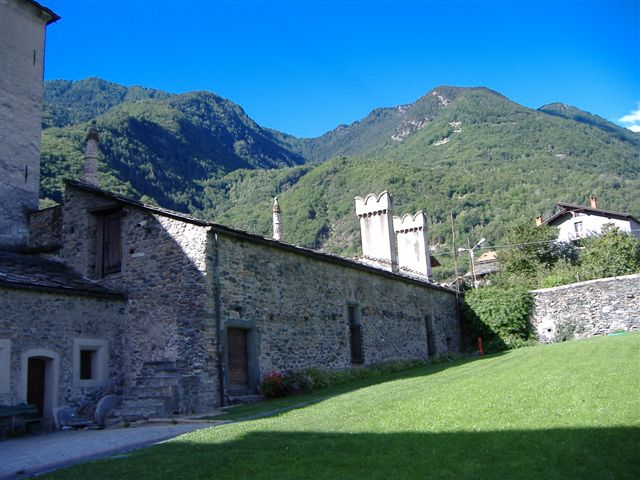
Issogne Castle.
