= Challand-Saint-Anselme =

Challand-Saint-Anselme Tchallàn damoùn (Valdôtain) z'uabra Tschallanh (Walser)
- Comune
- Comune di Challand-Saint-Anselme; Commune de Challand-Saint-Anselme
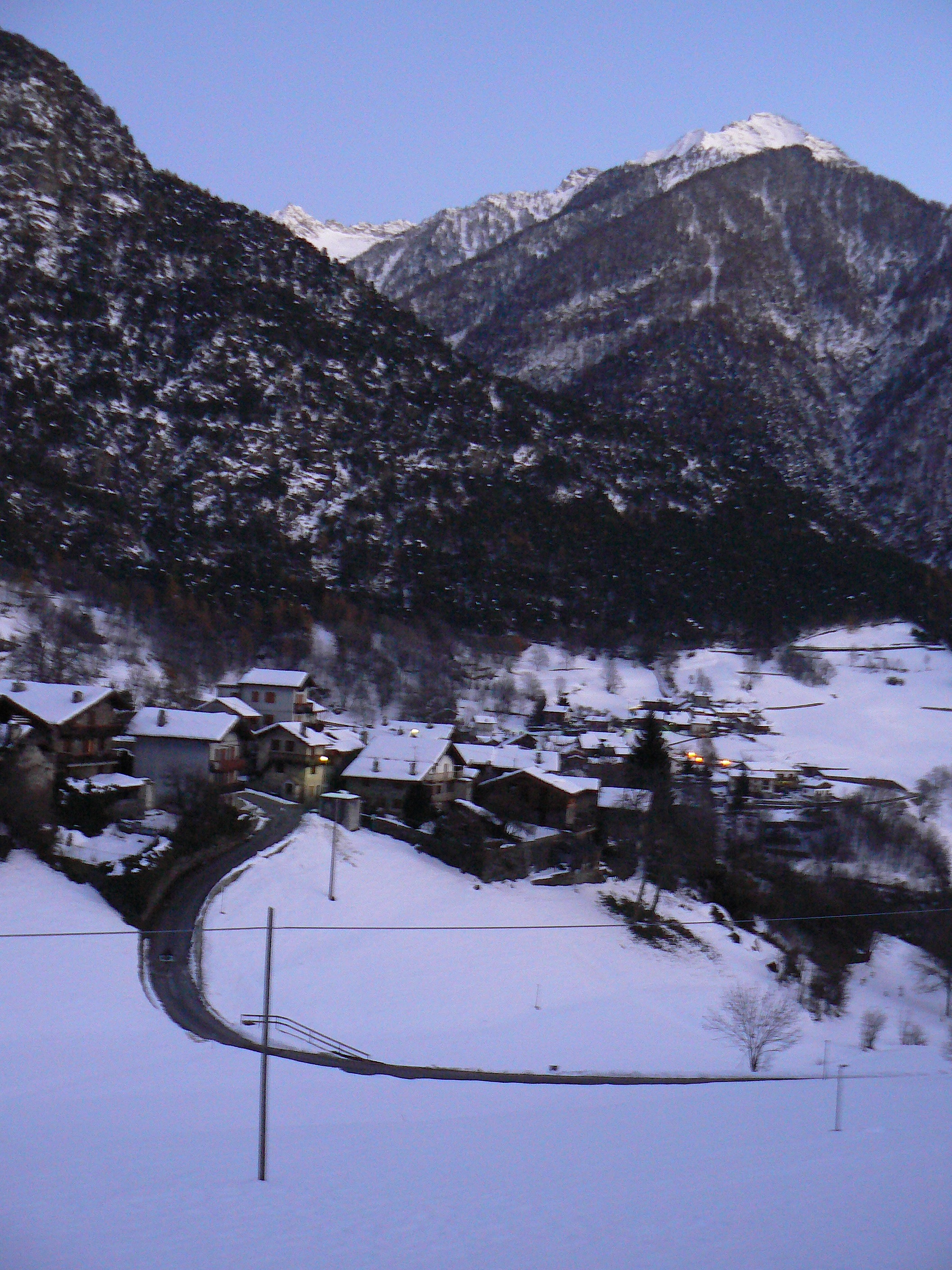
- Challand-Saint-Anselme (hamlet Maé) in winter.

- Coat of arms

- Location within Italy Location within Aosta Valley
- Coordinates: 45°43′N 7°44′E
- Country: Italy
- Region: Aosta Valley
- Province: none
- Frazioni: Allésaz, Arbaz, Bachamp, Châtillonet, Corliod, Maé, Moussanet, Orbeillaz, Pésan, Plésod, Quinçod (chef-lieu), Ruvère, Tilly, Tollégnaz

Government
  - Mayor: Piero Dufour

Area
  - Total: 27.99 km^{2} (10.81 sq mi)
- Elevation: 1,030 m (3,380 ft)

Population (31 December 2022)
  - Total: 746
  - Density: 26.7/km^{2} (69.0/sq mi)
- Demonym: Challandins
- Time zone: UTC+1 (CET)
  - Summer (DST): UTC+2 (CEST)
- Postal code: 11020
- Dialing code: 0125
- Patron saint: Anselm of Aosta
- Saint day: 21 April
- Website: Official website

Challand-Saint-Anselme (French: [ʃalɑ̃ sɛ̃t‿ɑ̃sɛlm]; Valdôtain: Tchallàn damoùn; Issime Walser: z'uabra Tschallanh); is a town and comune in the Aosta Valley region of northwestern Italy.

== Main sights ==
- Church of Saint-Anselme
- Shrine of Sainte-Anne
- Historical mills in Quinçod and Ruvère
