= Challand-Saint-Victor =

Challand-Saint-Victor Tchallàn Dézot (Valdôtain) z'undra Tschallanh (Walser)
- Comune
- Comune di Challand-Saint-Victor; Commune de Challand-Saint-Victor
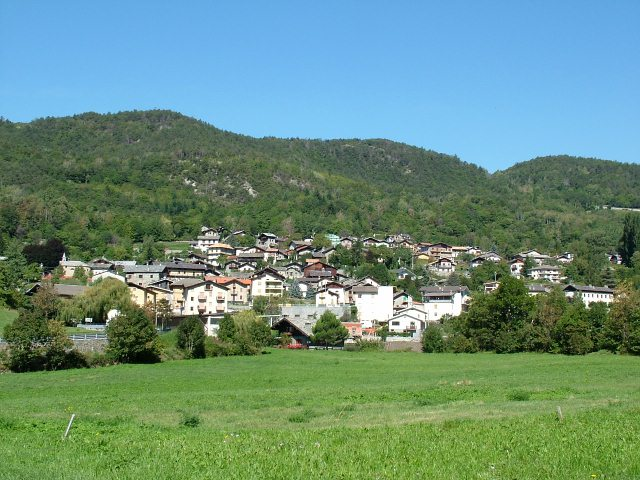

- Coat of arms

- Location within Italy Location within Aosta Valley
- Coordinates: 45°41′N 7°42′E
- Country: Italy
- Region: Aosta Valley
- Province: none
- Frazioni: Abaz, Champeille, Châtaignères, Isollaz, Nabian, Sizan, Targnod, Vervaz, Ville, Viranº

Government
  - Mayor: Michel Savin

Area
  - Total: 25 km^{2} (9.7 sq mi)
- Elevation: 744 m (2,441 ft)

Population (31 December 2022)
  - Total: 551
  - Density: 22/km^{2} (57/sq mi)
- Demonym: Challandins
- Time zone: UTC+1 (CET)
  - Summer (DST): UTC+2 (CEST)
- Postal code: 11020
- Dialing code: 0125
- Patron saint: Saint Victor de Soleure
- Saint day: 30 September
- Website: Official website

Challand-Saint-Victor (French: [ʃalɑ̃ sɛ̃ viktɔʁ]; Valdôtain: Tchallàn Dézot; Issime Walser: z'undra Tschallanh) is a town and comune in the Aosta Valley region of northwestern Italy.
