= Verrès =

Verrès Vérès (Valdôtain) Verez (Walser)
- Comune
- Comune di Verrès; Commune de Verrès
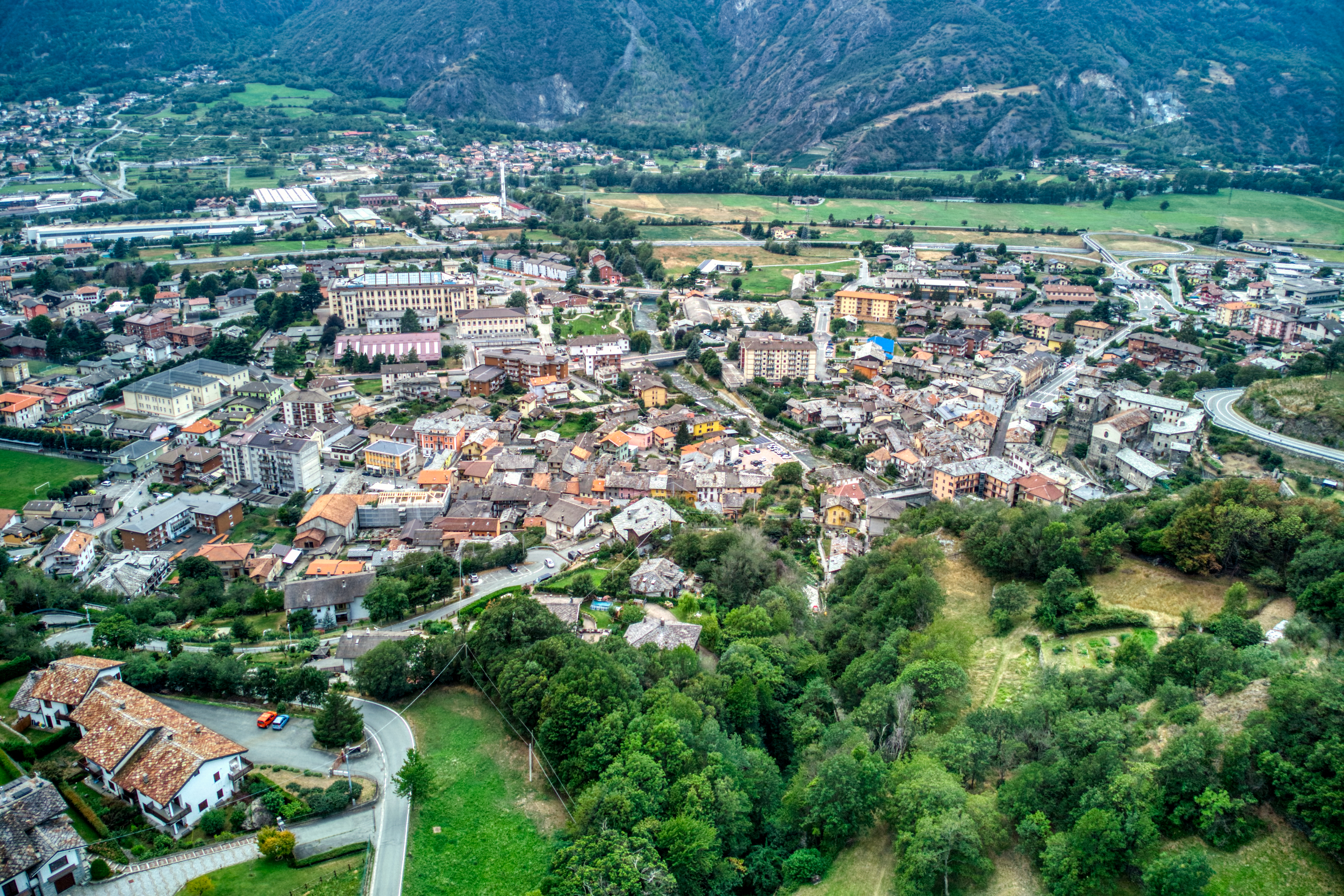

- Coat of arms

- Location within Italy Location within Aosta Valley
- Coordinates: 45°40′N 7°42′E
- Country: Italy
- Region: Aosta Valley
- Province: none
- Frazioni: La Barmaz, Le Baracon, Bérat, Carogne, Casset, Champore, Chapine, Chavascon, Le Crest, Le Glair, Le Gramonier, La Grange Neuve, La Murasse, La Nâche, Omeins, Piet, Polarey, Possuey, Praz-Ussel, Couassod, Roléchon, Riorte, Riverolaz, Rovarey, Sérémont, La Tour, Torille, Vert, Vianad, Vigne-Gard, Veusoz

Area
  - Total: 8.21 km^{2} (3.17 sq mi)
- Elevation: 391 m (1,283 ft)

Population (31 December 2022)
  - Total: 2,539
  - Density: 309/km^{2} (801/sq mi)
- Demonym(s): Verressiens (in French) verrezziesi (in Italian)
- Time zone: UTC+1 (CET)
  - Summer (DST): UTC+2 (CEST)
- Postal code: 11029
- Dialing code: 0125
- ISTAT code: 007073
- Patron saint: Saint Giles
- Saint day: 1 September
- Website: Official website

Verrès French pronunciation (Valdôtain: Vérès; töitschu Walser: Verez) is a town and comune in the Aosta Valley region of north-western Italy.

== Landmarks ==
- Verrès Castle
