= Blue Lake (Italy) =

Mountain lake of the Pennine Alps

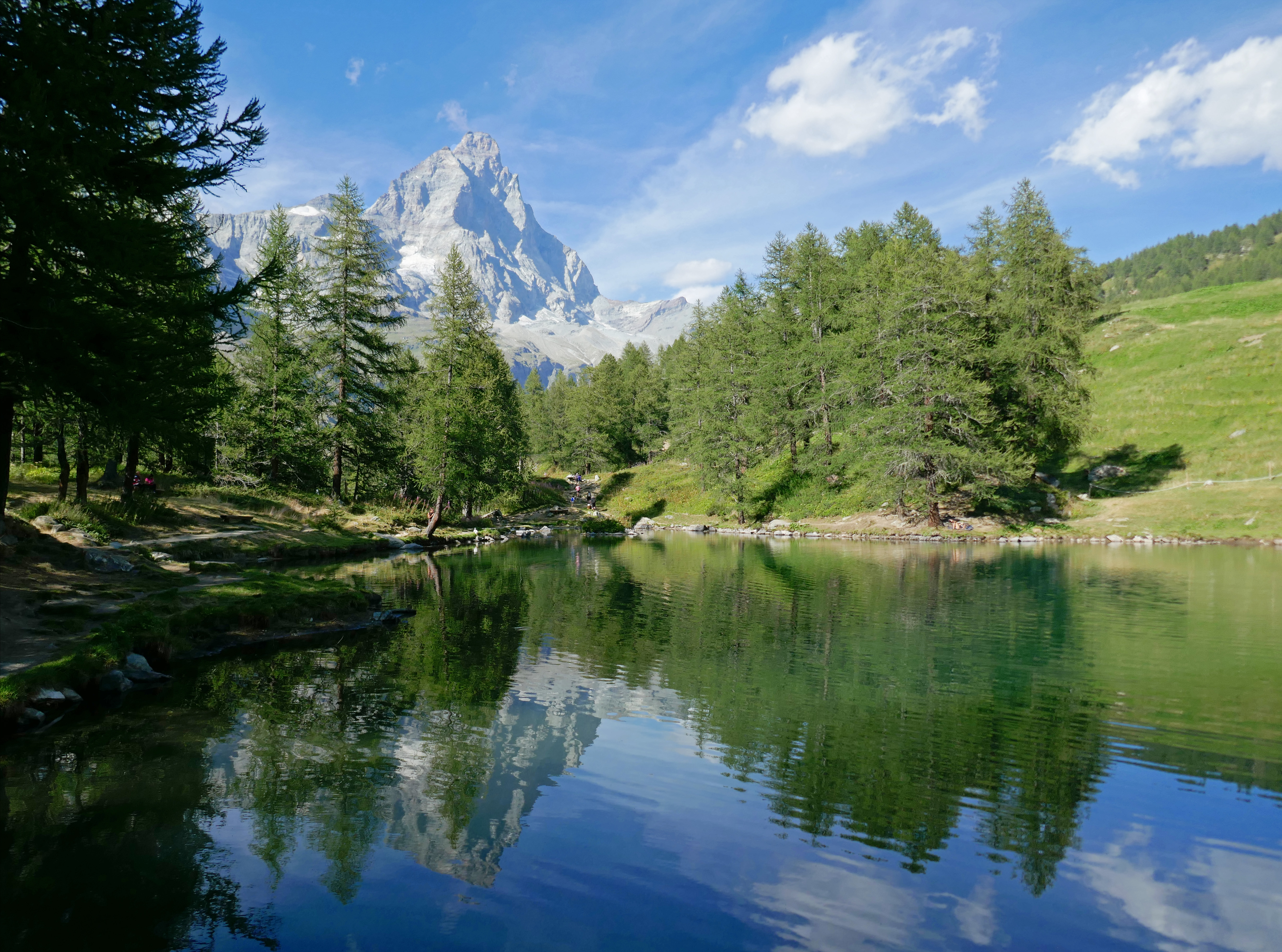
- The lake with the Matterhorn in the background

- Location within Aosta Valley Location within Italy Location within Alps
- Interactive map of Blue Lake
- Location: Valtournenche, Aosta Valley, Italy
- Coordinates: 45°55′21″N 7°37′05″E
- Basin countries: Italy
- Surface elevation: 1,980 m (6,500 ft)

The Blue Lake (Italian: Lago Blu, French: Lac Bleu) is a mountain lake of the Pennine Alps, located not far from the Breuil-Cervinia ski resort in Valtournenche, Aosta Valley, Italy.

The lake is located at a height of 1,980 metres above sea level. Its pristine waters are known for reflecting the Matterhorn.
