= Flag of Aosta Valley =

- Proportion: 2:3
- Adopted: 16 March 2006
- Design: A vertical bicolour of black and red

The flag of Aosta Valley is one of the official symbols of the region of Aosta Valley, Italy. The current flag was adopted on 16 March 2006.

== History ==
The flag was created in 1942 from an idea by canon Joseph Bréan, who proposed its use in an anti-fascist brochure from 1942 entitled "The Great Aosta Valley". Joseph Bréan drew the colours of the 16th-century coat of arms of the Duchy of Aosta, a silver lion on a black shield with a red tongue, and a two-colour flag. Shortly afterwards, the resistance movements in the Valle d'Aosta adopted these colours for themselves, creating a flag halved vertically ("per pale"). However, after the liberation, this flag was never formally ratified, both because of widespread fear that it might fuel desires for independence and because of its similarity to some banners of the anarchist movement.

The flag was in unofficial use from 1947 until it was officially adopted under the Regional Law of 2006.

Coat of arms of the Duchy of Aosta

Coat of arms of Challant family

Proposed flag of Aosta Valley by Lega Nord
