= Aymavilles Castle =

Castle in Aosta Valley, Italy

- Castello di Aymavilles (Italian); Château d'Aymavilles (French)
- Aymavilles, Aosta Valley, Italy
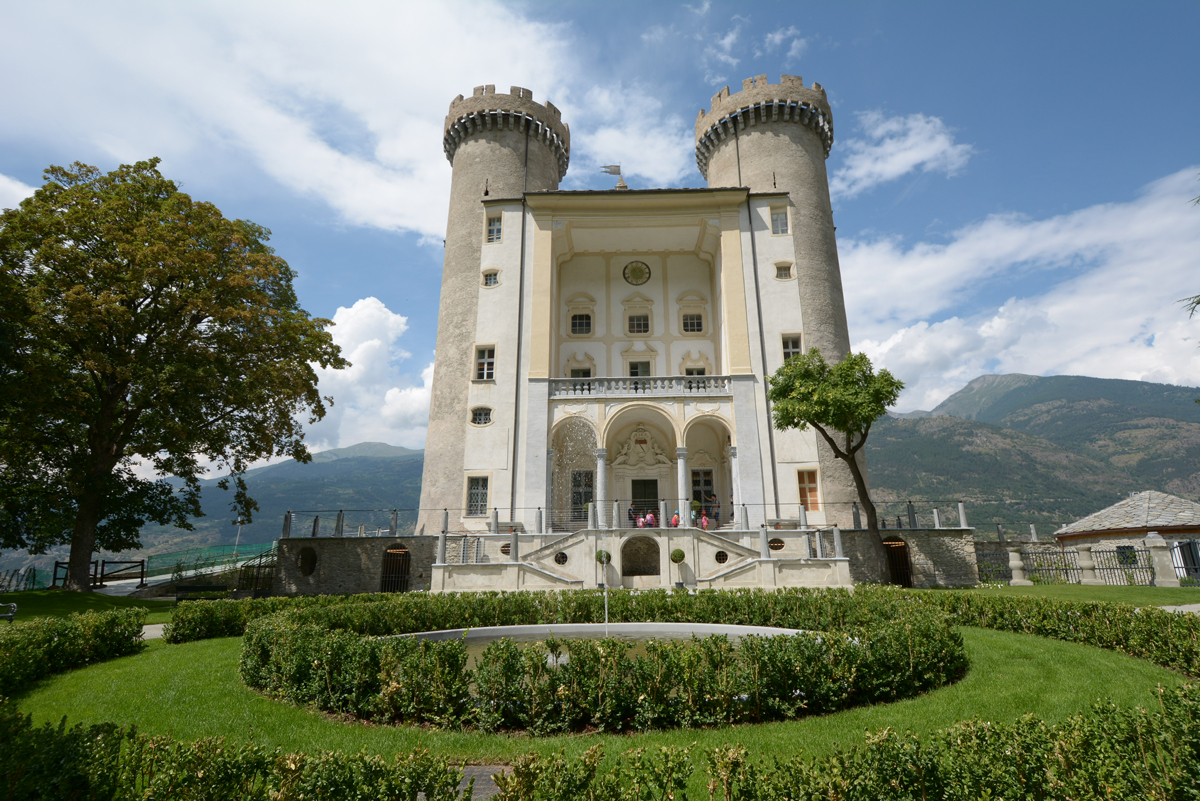
- Aymavilles Castle in 2018

Site information
- Type: Castle

Location
- Coordinates: 45°42′08.59″N 7°14′53.46″E

Aymavilles Castle (Italian: Castello di Aymavilles, French: Château d'Aymavilles) is a castle located in Aymavilles, Aosta Valley, Italy.

== History ==
The castle was built in a strategic position on top of a moraine hill, allowing it to control the passage through the central Aosta Valley where the Via delle Gallie passed connecting Italy and France, and to monitor access to the Cogne Valley, where stone was anciently quarried.

The earliest traces of the building date back to 1287. This ancient and original structure was very different from its current appearance, as it resembled more a fortified house, whose features can still be recognized today in Écours Castle in La Salle or La Mothe Castle in Arvier.

The structure was then equipped with a surrounding wall to shelter and protect the population in case of danger, following the model of Cly Castle and Graines Castle.

In 1354, the Counts of Savoy entrusted the castle to a branch of the Challant family, which for this reason would later be known as the Challant-Aymavilles line. A new floor was added and the keep was extended westwards. Aimone of Challant ordered the construction of a second defensive wall, a moat, and a drawbridge.

At the beginning of the 15th century, at the request of Amedeo of Challant, four circular towers were added. These towers were preserved through later renovations and would come to define the castle's distinctive exterior appearance. The stones used for the construction are tuff and marble. A few years later, Amedeo's son, Giacomo of Challant, added one floor as well as corbels and battlements.

In 1728, Giuseppe Felice of Challant converted the castle into a residence, dismantling its external fortifications. Since then, the castle has remained largely unchanged.

== Gallery ==
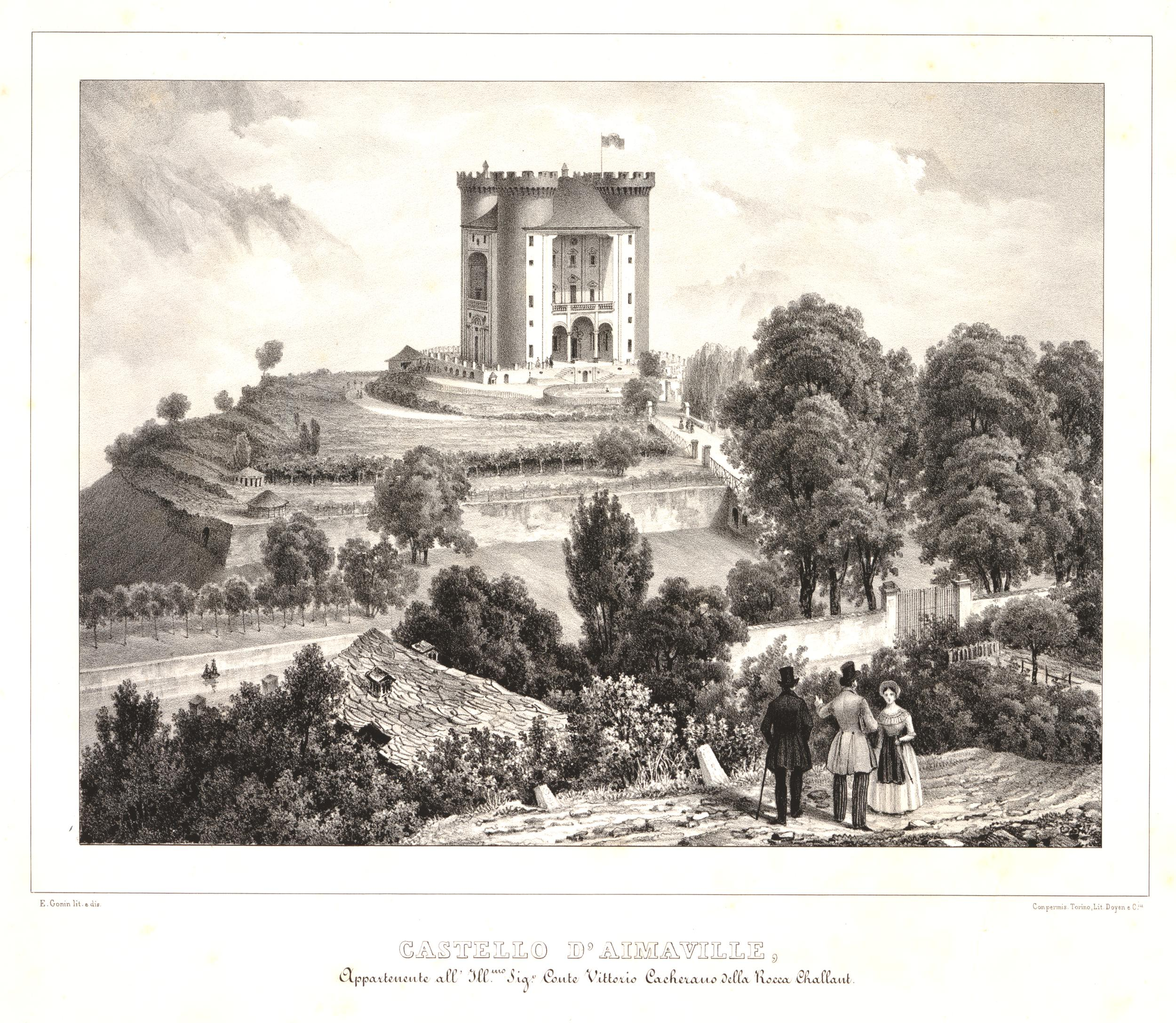

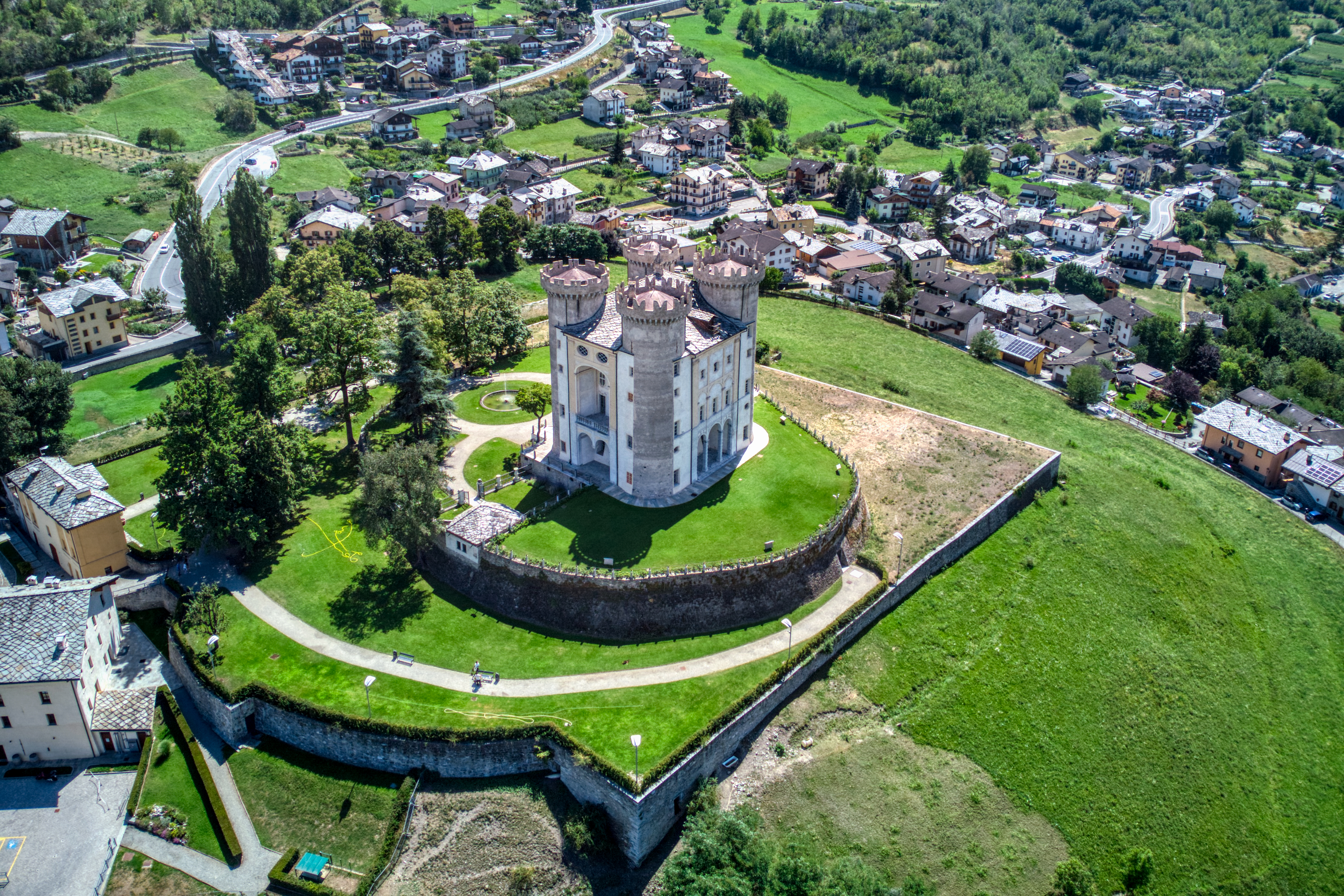

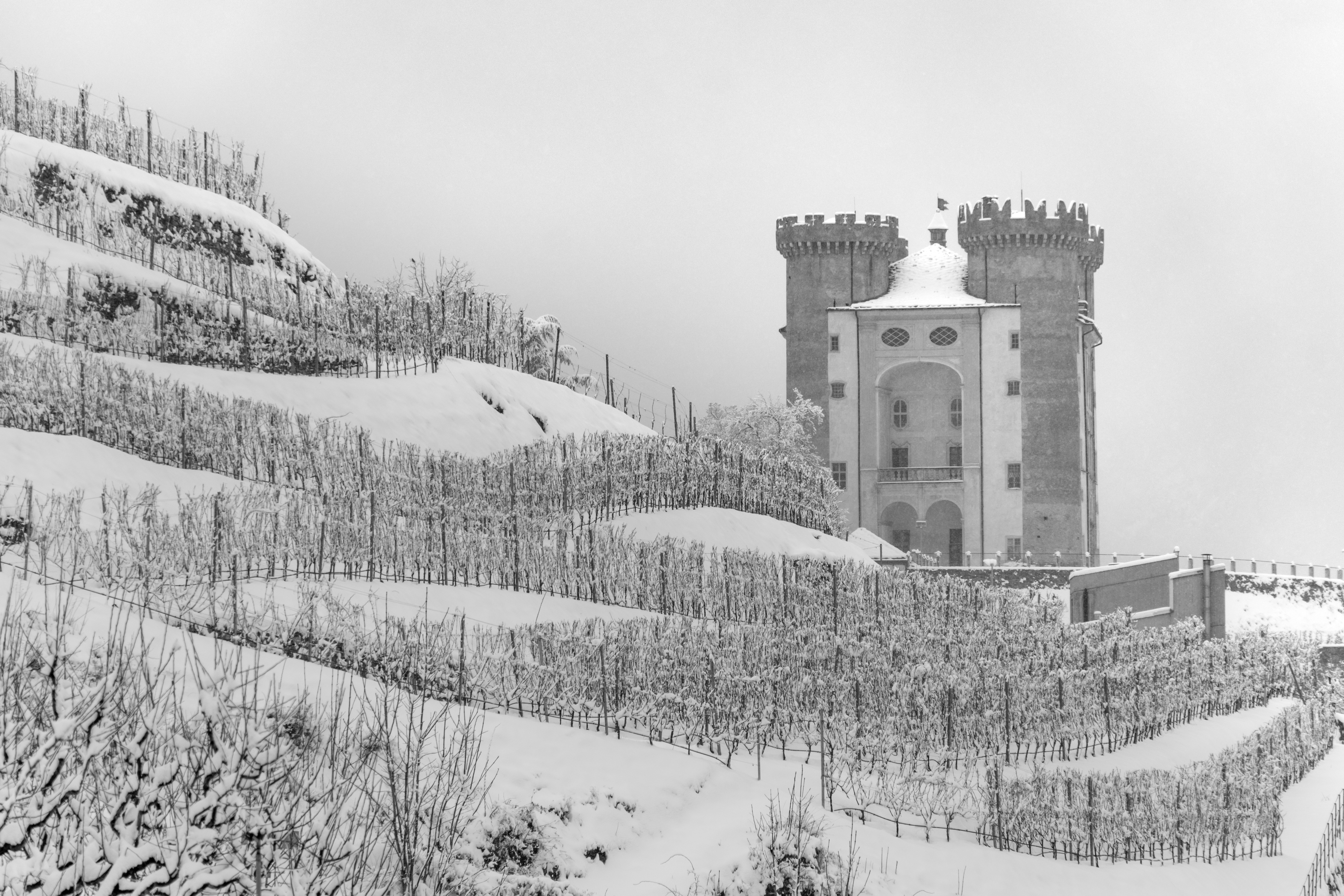
