= Saint-Pierre Castle =

12th century castle located at Saint-Pierre in the Aosta Valley, Italy

- Aosta Valley, Italy
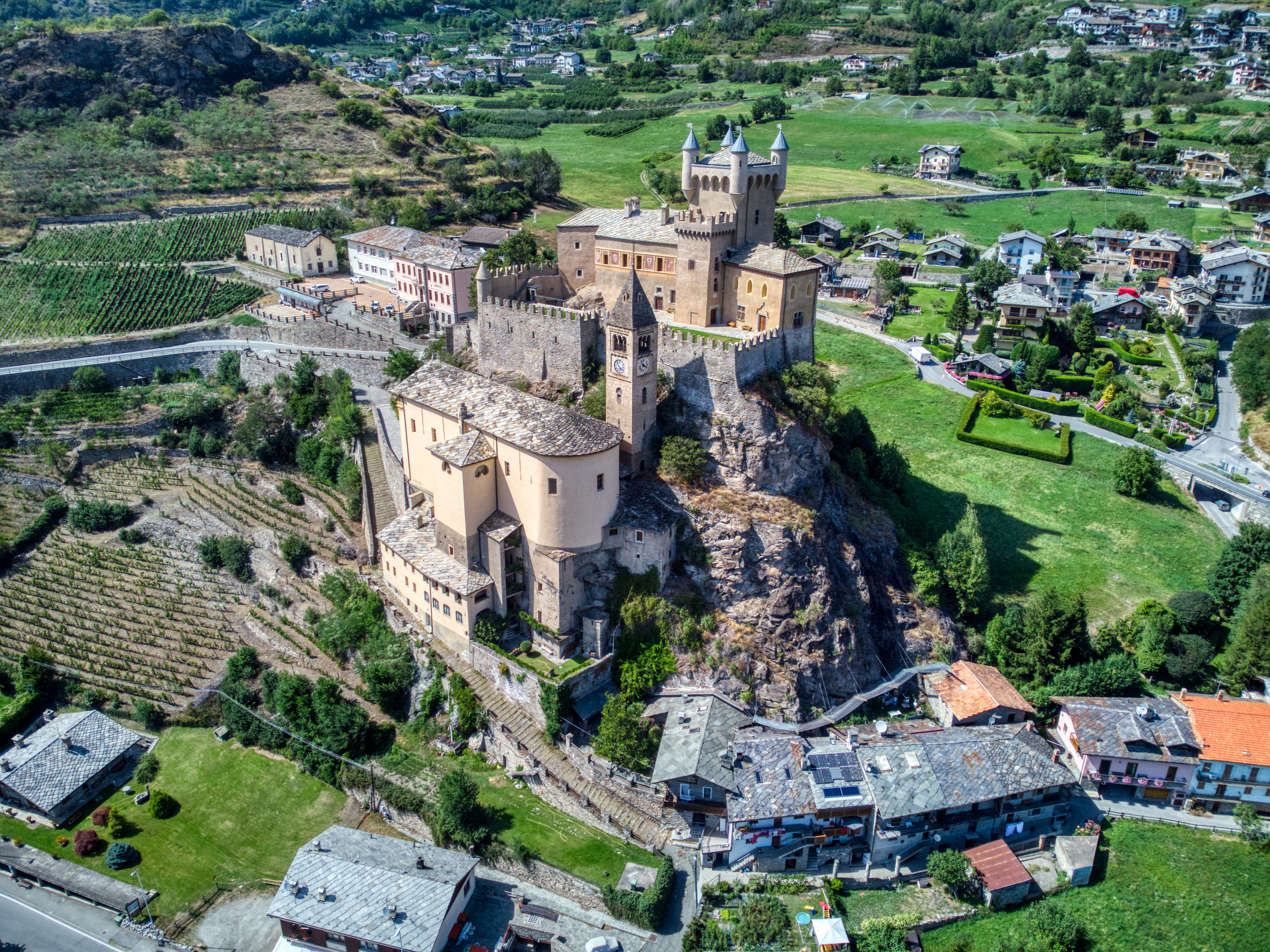
- Saint-Pierre Castle with the parish church of Saint-Pierre in the foreground

Location
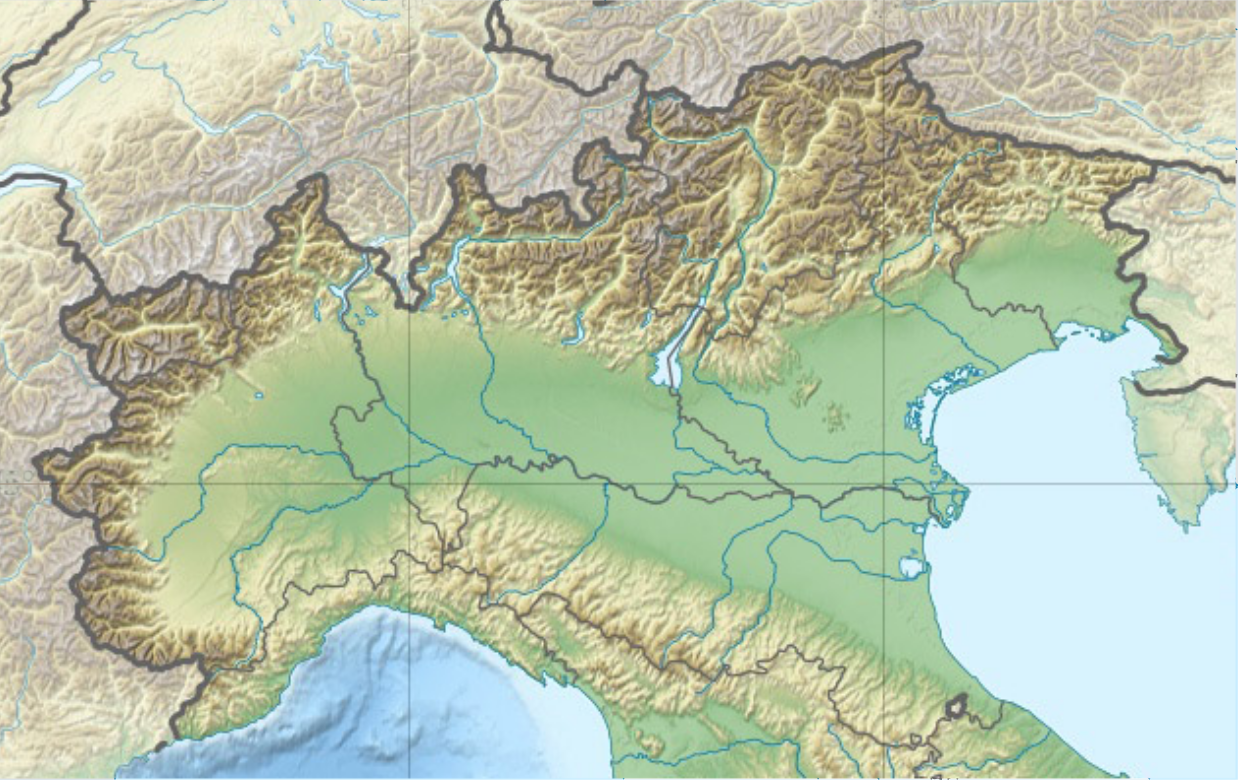
- Coordinates: 45°42′37″N 7°13′38″E

Saint-Pierre Castle (Italian: Castello di Saint-Pierre, French: Château de Saint-Pierre) is a late 12th century castle located at Saint-Pierre in the Aosta Valley, Italy.

== Early history ==
The first records of the castle date from the late 12th century and it is thought that is when the castle was first constructed. Far less grand than it is today, the original castle consisted only of basic walls and two towers. Over subsequent centuries, the castle had a number of owners including members of the House of Savoy. A family of local nobility (House of Roncas, or Maison de Roncas in French) purchased the castle in the 17th century and it was that family that expanded the castle into a large fortified residence.

== Later history ==
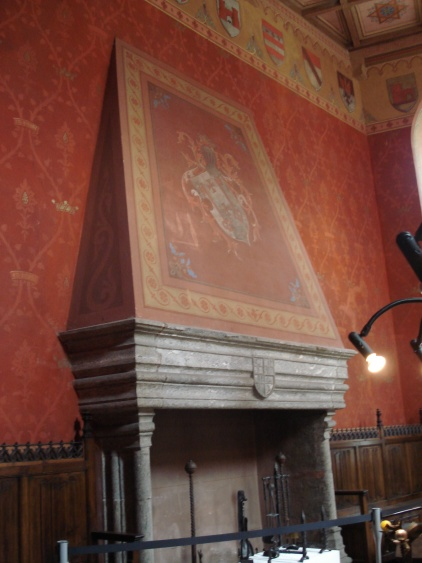
One of the castle's restored fireplaces.

Thereafter, the castle fell into disrepair until its purchase by baron Emanuele Bollati in the 1870s. He renovated the castle and modernised many of its features. It remained in the possession of his family until the 20th century when it was handed over to the town of Saint-Pierre and became the Regional Museum of Natural Science (Italian: Museo Regionale di Scienze Naturali, French: Musée régional des sciences naturelles).

In 1824, the castle was sketched by a travelling James Duffield Harding.

At the foot of the castle, standing out in stucco white, is the parish church of Saint-Pierre, built in 1872.

== See also ==
- List of castles in Italy
