= Aosta Valley =

Autonomous region of Italy

Aosta Valley Valle d'Aosta (Italian) Vallée d'Aoste (French) Vâl d'Aoûta (Arpitan)
- Autonomous region and province
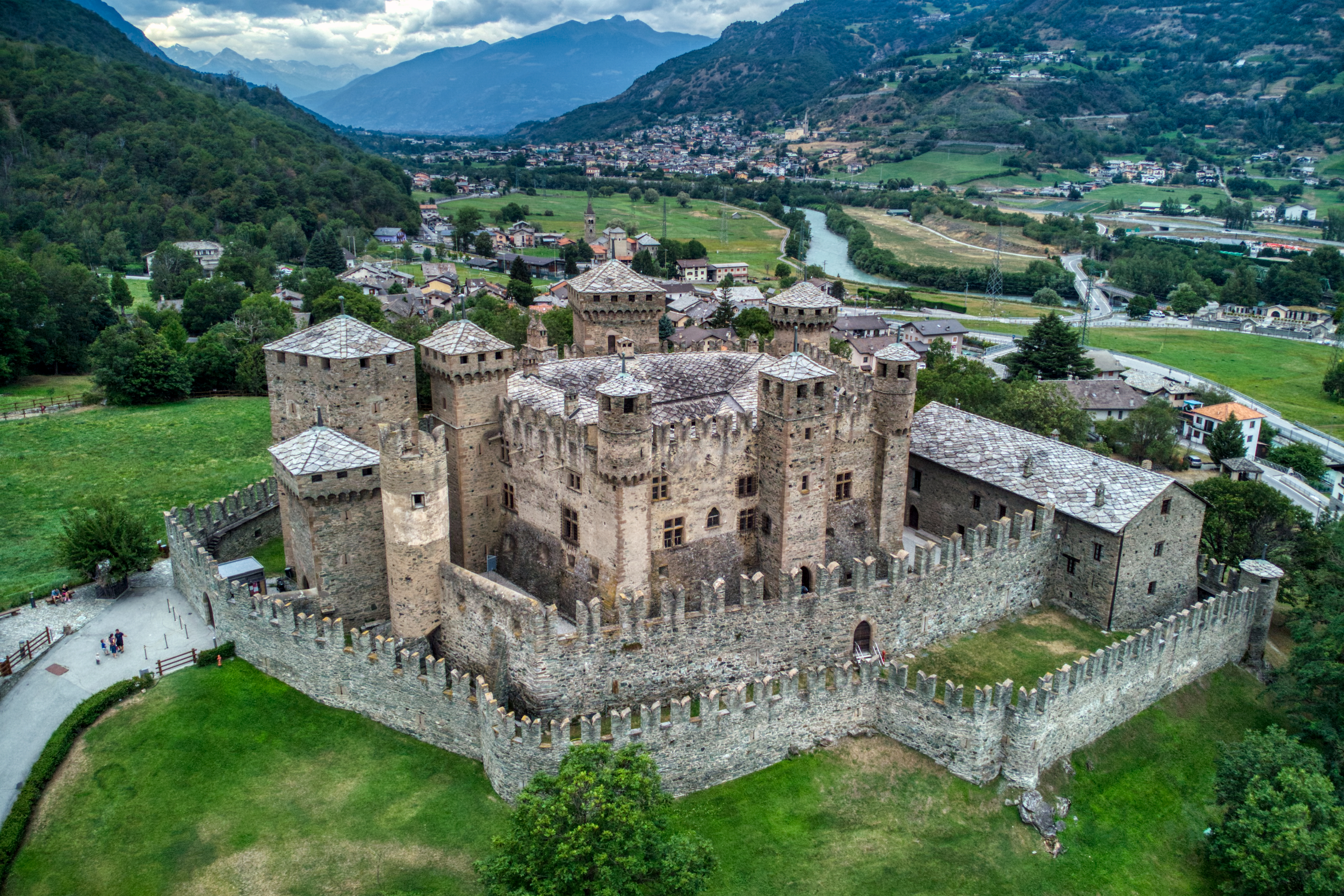
- The 13th-century Fénis Castle in the Aosta Valley

- Flag Coat of arms
- Anthem: Montagnes Valdôtaines
- Coordinates: 45°45′N 7°26′E
- Country: Italy
- Capital: Aosta
- Municipalities: 74

Government
  - Type: Parliamentary system
  - President: Renzo Testolin (UV)

Area
  - Total: 3,260.90 km^{2} (1,259.04 sq mi)

Population (2026)
  - Total: 122,554
  - Density: 37.5829/km^{2} (97.3392/sq mi)
- Demonyms: English: Valdostan or Valdostanian; Italian: valdostano (man), valdostana (woman); French: Valdôtain (man), Valdôtaine (woman); Arpitan: vâldotèn (man), vâldotèna (woman)

Demographics
  - Citizenship: Italian: 95%
  - Official languages: Italian; French
  - Regional language: Valdôtain

GDP
  - Total: €5.852 billion (2024)
  - Per capita: €47,967 (2024)
- Time zone: UTC+1 (CET)
  - Summer (DST): UTC+2 (CEST)
- ISO 3166 code: IT-23
- HDI (2021): 0.889 very high · 14th of 21
- NUTS Region: ITC
- Website: Regione.vda.it

The Aosta Valley (Italian: Valle d'Aosta [ˈvalle daˈɔsta]; French: Vallée d'Aoste [vale dɔst]; (Note: If pronounced in Aostan French; [vale daɔst] if pronounced in Standard French.) (Note: Also informally known as Val d'Aosta or Val d'Aoste in Italian and French respectively.) Valdôtain: Vâl d'Aoûta [val duta]; Walser: Augschtalann or Ougstalland; Piedmontese: Val d'Osta), officially the Autonomous Region of Aosta Valley, (Note: Italian: Regione Autonoma Valle d'Aosta; French: Région autonome Vallée d'Aoste.) is a mountainous autonomous region of northwestern Italy. It is bordered by Auvergne-Rhône-Alpes, France, to the west; by Valais, Switzerland, to the north; and by Piedmont, Italy, to the south and east. The regional capital is Aosta.

With a population of 122,554 in an area of 3,260.90 square kilometres (1,259.04 sq mi), it is the smallest, least populous, and least densely populated region of Italy. With the province of Aosta having been dissolved in 1945, the Aosta Valley region became the first region of Italy to abolish provincial subdivisions, and remains the only such region. Provincial administrative functions are provided by the regional government. The region is divided into 74 municipalities (Italian: comuni, French: communes).

Italian and French are the official languages, and the Valdôtain dialect of Franco-Provençal is also officially recognized. Italian is spoken as a mother tongue by 77.29% of the population, Valdôtain by 17.91%, and French by 1.25%. In 2009, reportedly 50.53% of the population could speak all three languages.

== History ==
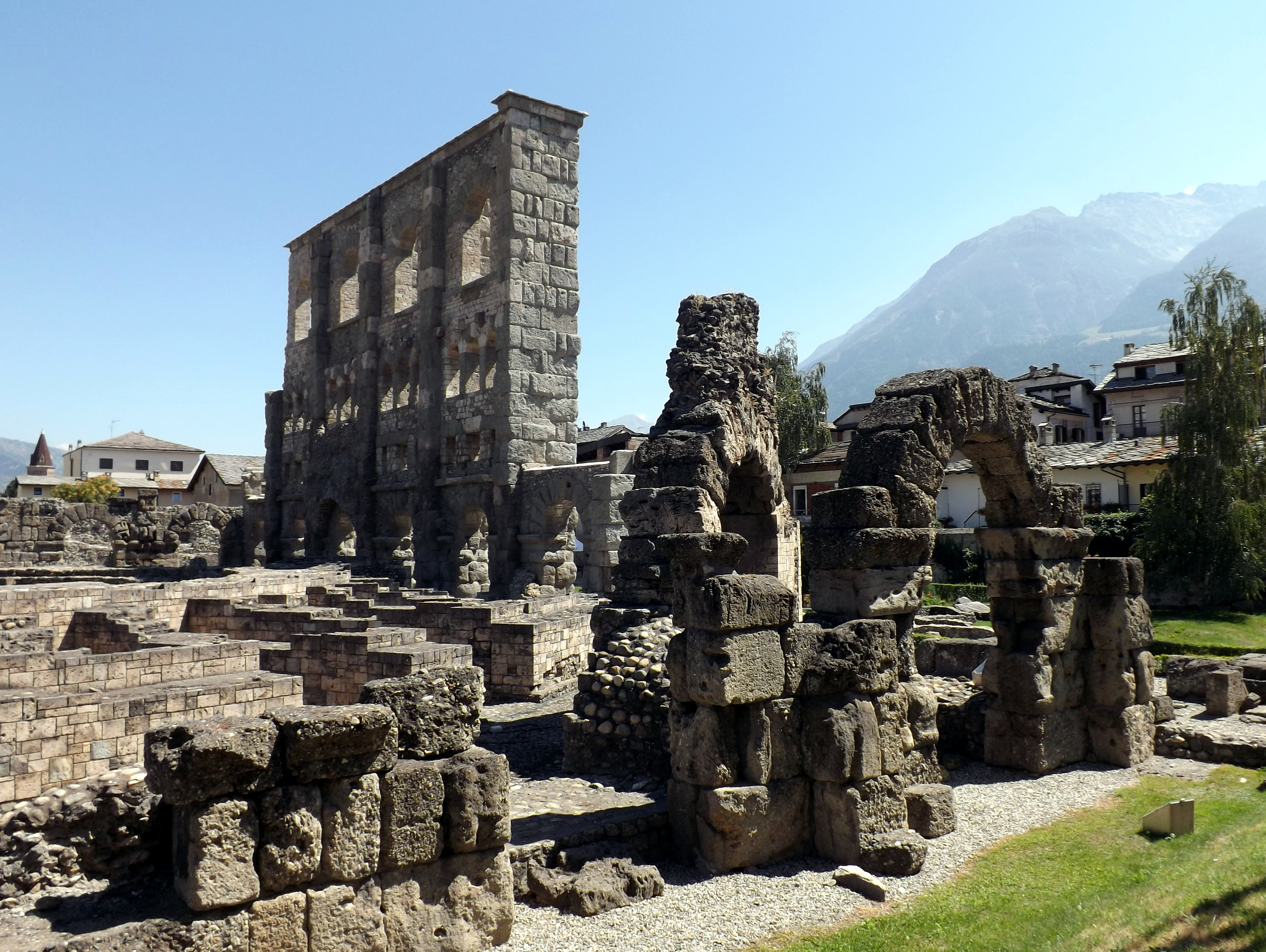
Remains of the Roman Theatre, Aosta

Early inhabitants of the Aosta Valley were Celts and Ligures, whose language heritage remains in some local placenames. Rome conquered the region from the local Salassi around 25 BC and founded Augusta Prætoria Salassorum (modern-day Aosta) to secure the strategic mountain passes, and they went on to build bridges and roads through the mountains.

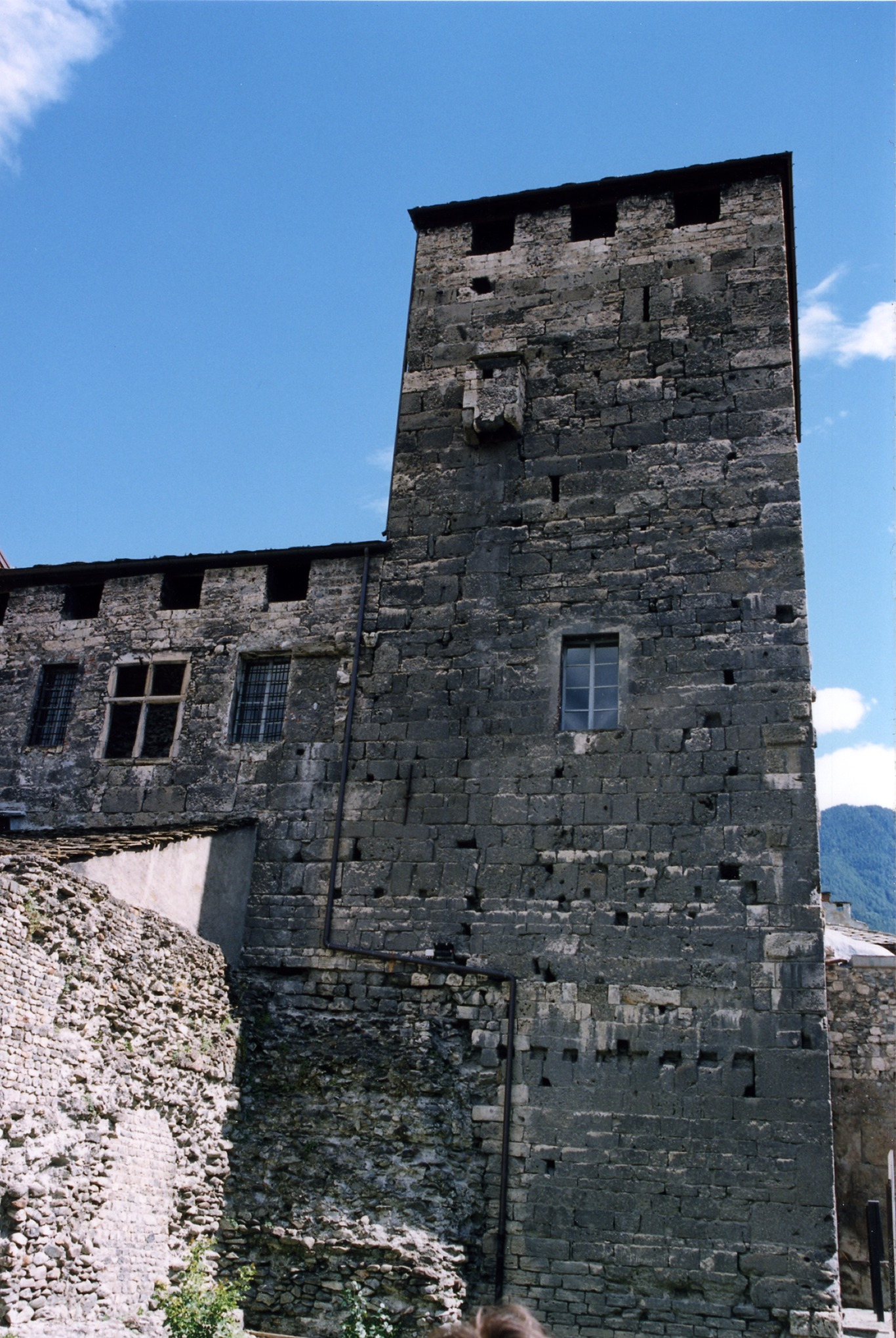
The Tour des Seigneurs de la Porte Saint-Ours in Aosta

In 1031–1032, Humbert I of Savoy, the founder of the House of Savoy, received the title Count of Aosta from Emperor Conrad II of the Franconian line and built himself a commanding fortification at Bard. Saint Anselm of Canterbury was born in Aosta in 1033 or 1034. The region was divided among strongly fortified castles, and in 1191, Thomas I of Savoy found it necessary to grant to the communes a Charte des franchises ("Charter of Liberties") which preserved autonomy—rights that were fiercely defended until 1770, when they were revoked to tie Aosta more closely to Piedmont, but which were again demanded during post-Napoleonic times. In the mid-13th century, Emperor Frederick II made the County of Aosta a duchy (see Duke of Aosta), and its arms charged with a lion rampant were carried in the Savoy arms until the reunification of Italy in 1870.

The region remained part of Savoy lands, with the exceptions of French occupations from 1539 to 1563, later in 1691, and then between 1704 and 1706. It was also ruled by the First French Empire between 1800 and 1814. During French rule, it was part of Aoste arrondissement in Doire department. As part of the Kingdom of Sardinia, it became part of the Kingdom of Italy in 1861 and was incorporated into the province of Turin. In 1927, the Fascist government established the province of Aosta.

French forces briefly controlled the area at the end of World War II, but withdrew under British and American pressure. The province of Aosta ceased to exist in 1945. The region gained special autonomous status in 1948.

== Geography ==
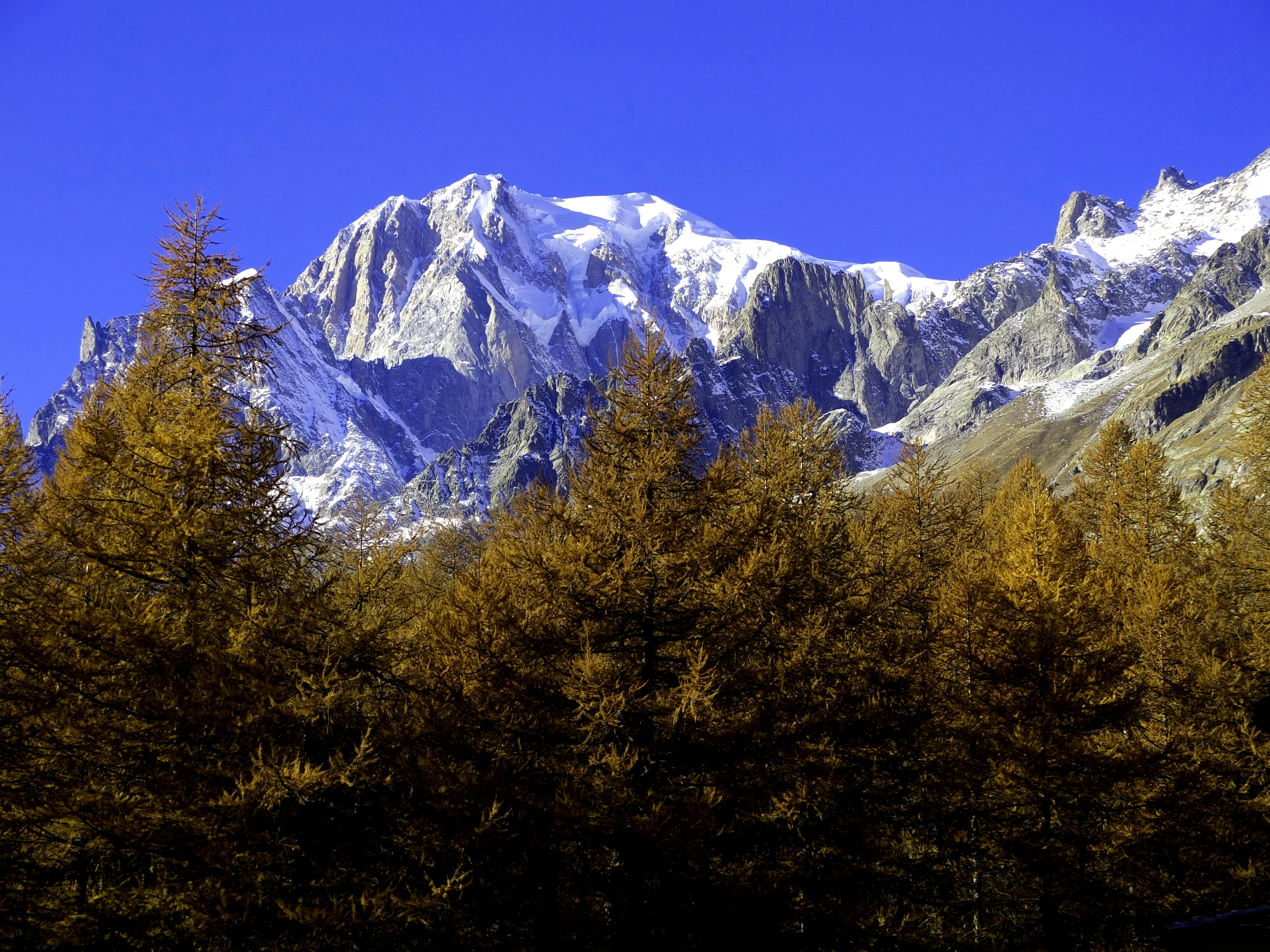
Mont Blanc in Aosta Valley, the highest point in the European Union

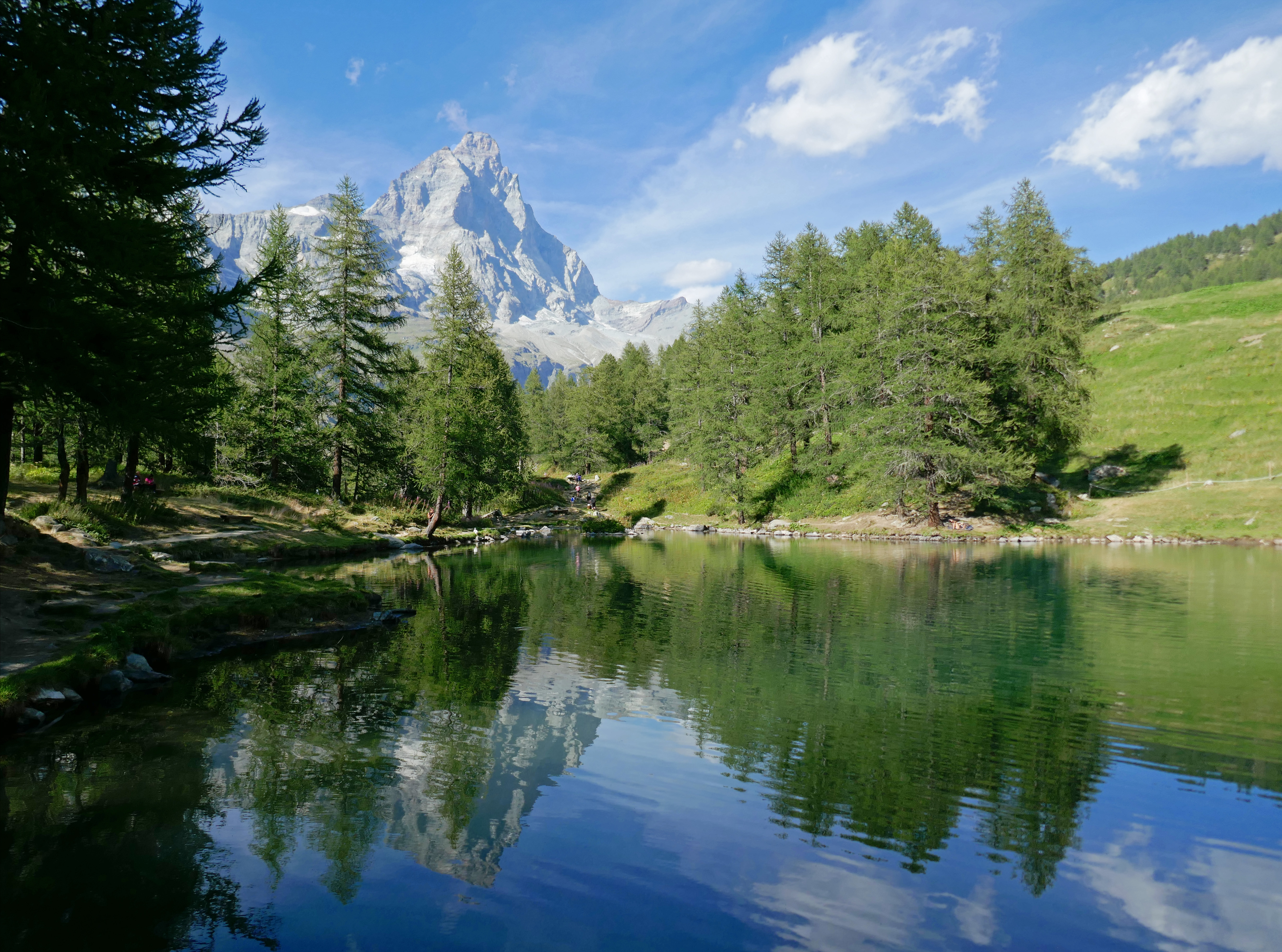
Blue Lake and the Matterhorn

The Aosta Valley is an Alpine valley which, with its tributary valleys, includes the Italian slopes of Mont Blanc, Monte Rosa, Gran Paradiso and the Matterhorn; its highest peak is Mont Blanc (4,810 m or 15,780 ft). This makes it the highest region in Italy, based on the highest point in each region.⁣⁣

=== Climate ===
The valleys, usually above 1,600 m (5,200 ft), annually have a cold continental climate (Dfc). In this climate, the snow season is very long, lasting as long as 8 to 9 months at the highest points. Temperatures in January are low, between −7 and −3 °C (19 and 27 °F), and in July are between 20 and 35 °C (68 and 95 °F).

Areas between 2,000 and 3,500 m (6,600 and 11,500 ft) usually have a tundra climate (ET), where every month has an average temperature below 10 °C (50 °F). This climate may be either a kind of more severe cold oceanic climate, with a low summer average but mild winters, sometimes above −3 °C (27 °F), especially near lakes, or a more severe cold continental climate, with a very low winter average. Temperature averages in Plateau Rosa, at 3,400 m (11,200 ft) high, are −11.6 °C (11.1 °F) in January and 1.4 °C (34.5 °F) in July. It is the coldest place in Italy where the climate is verifiable.

In the past, above 3,500 m (11,500 ft), all months had an average temperature below freezing, with a perpetual frost climate (EF). In recent years, however, there has been a rise in temperatures. See, as an example, the data for Plateau Rosa.

== Government and politics ==
For decades, the valley has been dominated by autonomist regional parties such as the Valdostan Union, which represents the interests of the French-speaking population. The latest regional election was held in late September 2025. The current President is Renzo Testolin, first elected in 2023 supported by a coalition of autonomist and progressive lists.

=== Municipalities ===
The Aosta Valley, the smallest region by area in Italy, is not divided into provinces. It is, however, still divided into 74 municipalities:

- Allein
- Antey-Saint-André
- Aosta
- Arnad
- Arvier
- Avise
- Ayas
- Aymavilles
- Bard
- Bionaz
- Brissogne
- Brusson
- Challand-Saint-Anselme
- Challand-Saint-Victor
- Chambave
- Chamois
- Champdepraz
- Champorcher
- Charvensod
- Châtillon
- Cogne
- Courmayeur
- Donnas
- Doues
- Émarèse
- Étroubles
- Fénis
- Fontainemore
- Gaby
- Gignod
- Gressan
- Gressoney-La-Trinité
- Gressoney-Saint-Jean
- Hône
- Introd
- Issime
- Issogne
- Jovençan
- La Magdeleine
- La Salle
- La Thuile
- Lillianes
- Montjovet
- Morgex
- Nus
- Ollomont
- Oyace
- Perloz
- Pollein
- Pont-Saint-Martin
- Pontboset
- Pontey
- Pré-Saint-Didier
- Quart
- Rhêmes-Notre-Dame
- Rhêmes-Saint-Georges
- Roisan
- Saint-Christophe
- Saint-Denis
- Saint-Marcel
- Saint-Nicolas
- Saint-Oyen
- Saint-Pierre
- Saint-Rhémy-en-Bosses
- Saint-Vincent
- Sarre
- Torgnon
- Valgrisenche
- Valpelline
- Valsavarenche
- Valtournenche
- Verrayes
- Verrès
- Villeneuve

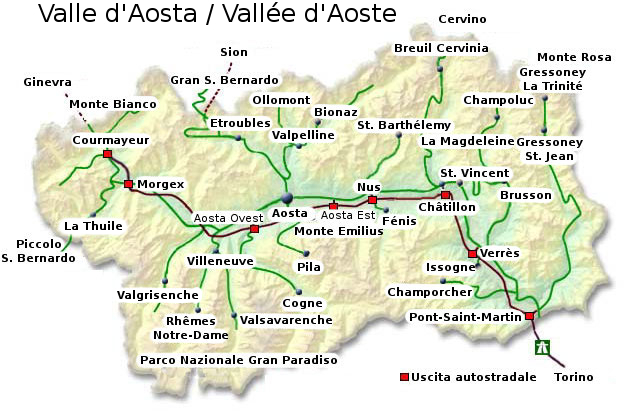
Map of the Aosta Valley

== Demographics ==
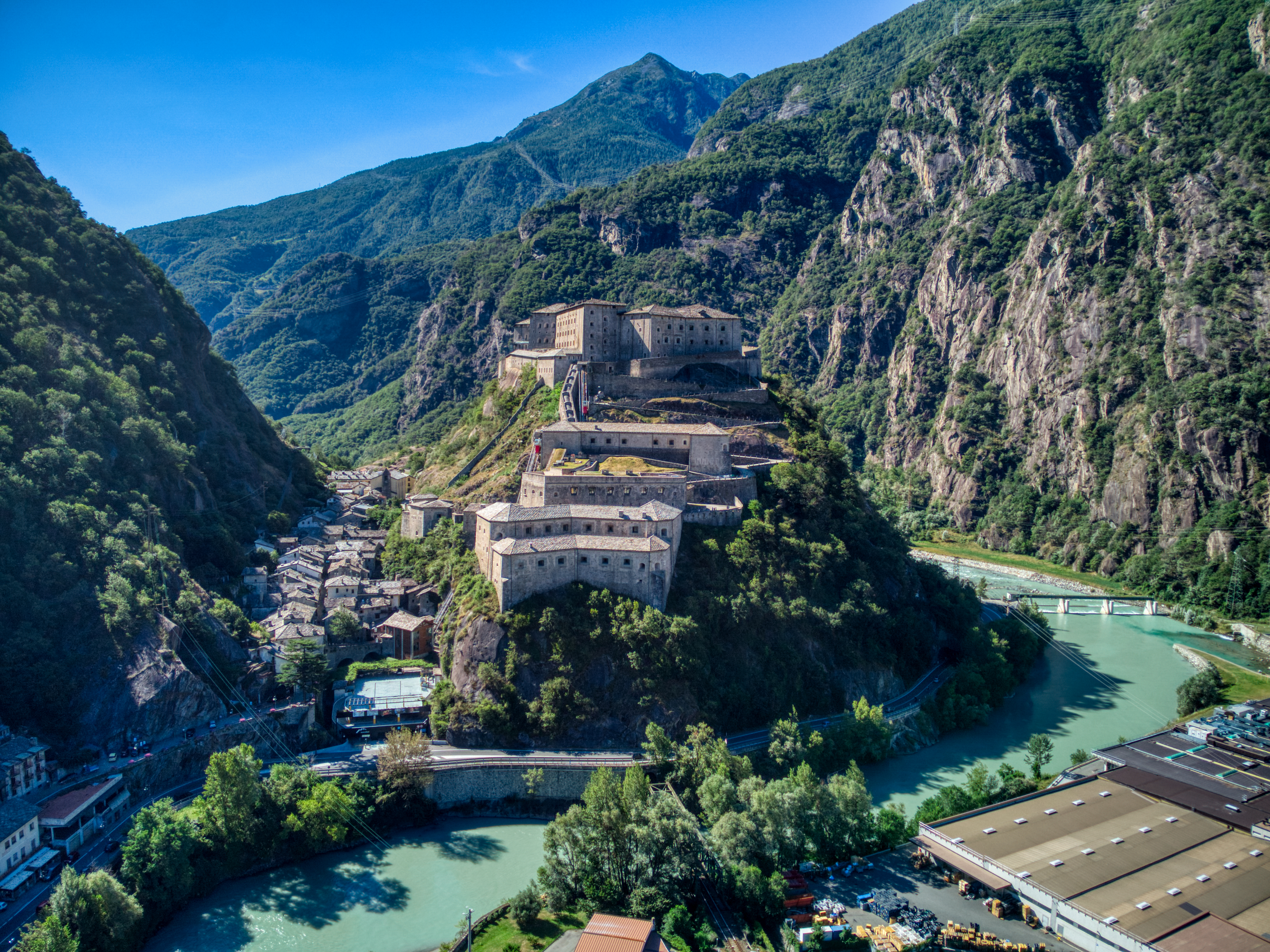
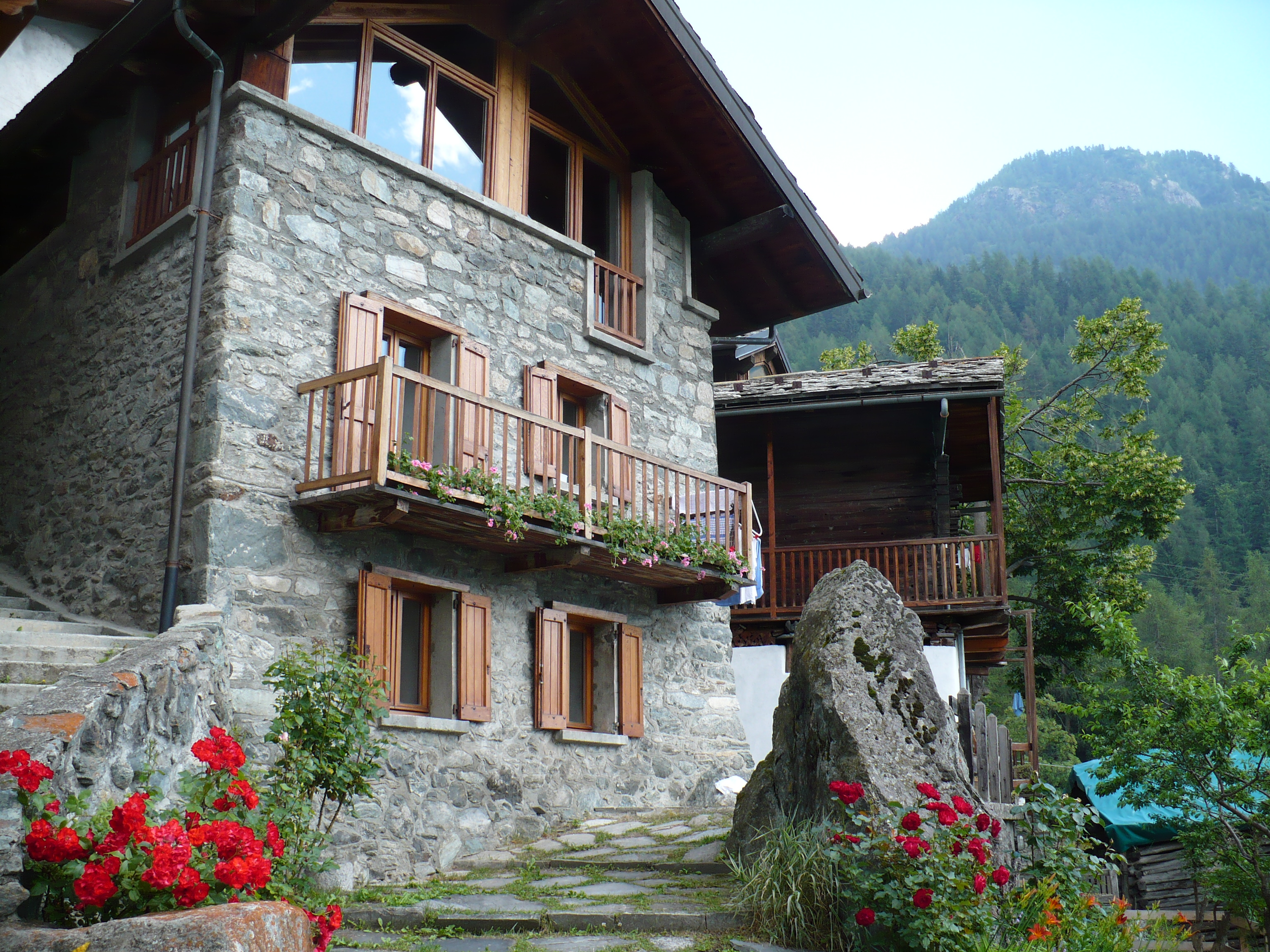
View of Bard (left) and typical Alpine houses in Valtournenche (right)

Historical population
Year	Pop.	±%
1861	85,900	—
1871	84,137	−2.1%
1881	85,504	+1.6%
1901	84,165	−1.6%
1911	81,457	−3.2%
1921	83,251	+2.2%
1931	83,479	+0.3%
1936	83,455	−0.0%
1951	94,140	+12.8%
1961	100,959	+7.2%
1971	109,150	+8.1%
1981	112,353	+2.9%
1991	115,938	+3.2%
2001	119,548	+3.1%
2011	126,806	+6.1%
2021	123,360	−2.7%
Source: ISTAT

As of 2026, the population is 122,554, of which 49.2% are male, and 50.8% are female. Minors make up 14.0% of the population, and seniors make up 26.3%.

At 37.6 inhabitants per km², the population density of Aosta Valley is by far the lowest of the Italian regions, far lower than the national average of 195.1. The region has extensive uninhabitable areas of mountain and glacier, with a substantial part of the population living in the central valley.

Negative natural population growth since 1976 has been more than offset by immigration. The region has one of Italy's lowest birth rates, with a rising average age. This, too, is partly compensated by immigration, since most immigrants arriving in the region are younger people working in the tourist industry. Between 1991 and 2011, the population of the Aosta Valley grew by 9.4%, which is the highest growth among the Italian regions. With a negative natural population growth, this is due exclusively to positive net migration.

The Valdôtain population and their language dialects have been the subject of some sociological research.

=== Immigration ===
As of 2025, immigrants make up 11.2% of the population. The 5 largest foreign countries of birth are Morocco, Romania, Albania, France, and Tunisia.

Foreign population by country of birth (2025)
Country of birth	Population
Morocco	2,280
Romania	2,177
Albania	1,189
France	949
Tunisia	477
Ukraine	470
Dominican Republic	444
Brazil	399
Moldova	389
Switzerland	369
Argentina	318
Russia	240
China	226
Germany	201
United Kingdom	193

== Culture ==
=== Languages ===
Mother tongues in the Aosta Valley (2001)
Italian	77.29%
Valdôtain (Franco-Provençal)	17.91%
Aostan French	1.25%
Other languages	4.95%

Use of languages by the population (2001)
Italian	96.01%
Aostan French	75.41%
Valdôtain (Franco-Provençal)	55.77%
All three languages	50.53%

The Aosta Valley was the first government authority to adopt Modern French as the sole official language in 1536, three years before France itself.

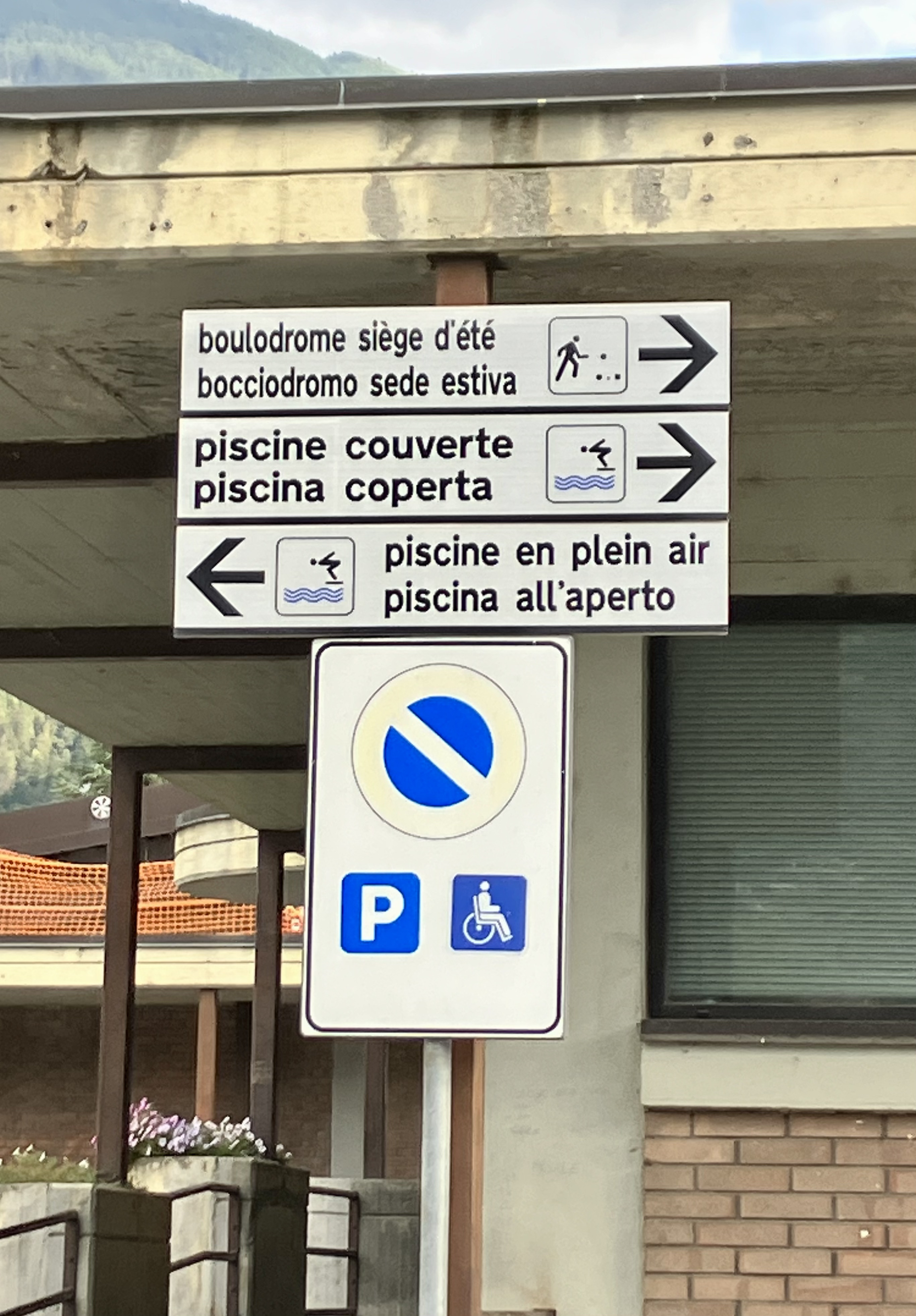
Bilingual road sign at Chambarlet (Aosta), with French going before Italian

Since 1946, Italian and French are the region's official languages and are used for the regional government's acts and laws, though Italian is the most widespread mother tongue and thus is much more widely spoken in everyday life, while French is mostly spoken in cultural life. Education is conducted evenly in French and Italian, so that anyone who has gone to school in the Aosta Valley can speak both languages to at least a medium-high level.

Legal decree No. 365 of 11 November 1946 (art. 2) states that it is mandatory to know both Italian and French to teach in Aosta Valley's schools. According to Aosta Valley's autonomous status (art. 39), the same number of hours of French and Italian teaching must be held. The decree No. 861 of the President of the Republic of 31 October 1975 (art. 5) states that it is mandatory to pass a French exam to teach in Aosta Valley for Italian native speakers, as well an Italian exam for French native speakers. Italian law No. 196 of 16 May 1978 states the adaptation rules of national educational programmes into French for Aosta Valley, and states as well that all members of the examination boards must be fluent both in Italian and French. Aosta Valley students must pass an extra test in French at the Secondary education final exam, similar to the first test (in Italian).

The regional language, known as patoué valdotèn or simply patoué (patois valdôtain in French), is a dialectal variety of Franco-Provençal. It is spoken as a native and second language by 68,000 residents, or about 58% of the population according to a sociolinguistic survey carried out by the Fondation Émile Chanoux in 2001.

The survey found that the Italian language was native to 77.29% of respondents, Franco-Provençal to 17.91%, and French to 1.25%, though the active use of these languages by the population shows French at 75.41% and Franco-Provençal at 55.77%. The population of Gressoney-Saint-Jean, Gressoney-La-Trinité and Issime, in the Lys Valley, speak two dialects of Walser German, Titsch and Töitschu respectively. According to the survey, Walser German was spoken as a mother tongue by 207 people, or 17.78%, in these three villages. Nevertheless, it was known to 56.38% of the population.

=== Castles and fortresses ===
There are numerous medieval castles and fortified houses in the Aosta Valley, including Châtel-Argent, Saint-Pierre Castle, Fénis Castle, Issogne Castle, Bard Fort, Ussel Castle, Sarre Castle, Cly Castle, Verrès Castle, and Châtelard Castle. Savoy Castle in Gressoney-Saint-Jean was conceived in the 19th century and completed in 1904. Since 1990, it has also been home to the Savoy Castle Alpine Botanical Garden.

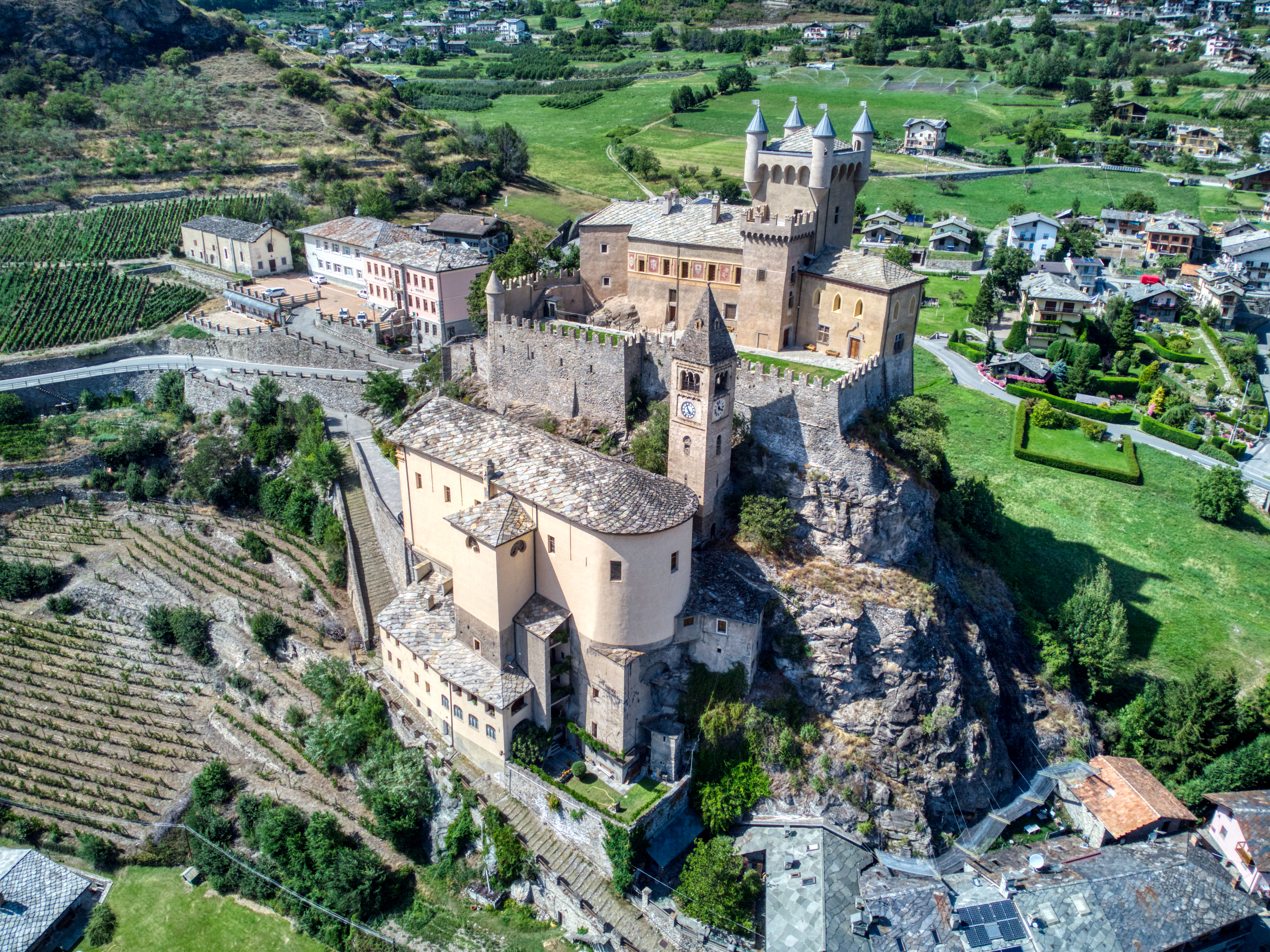
The Saint-Pierre Castle

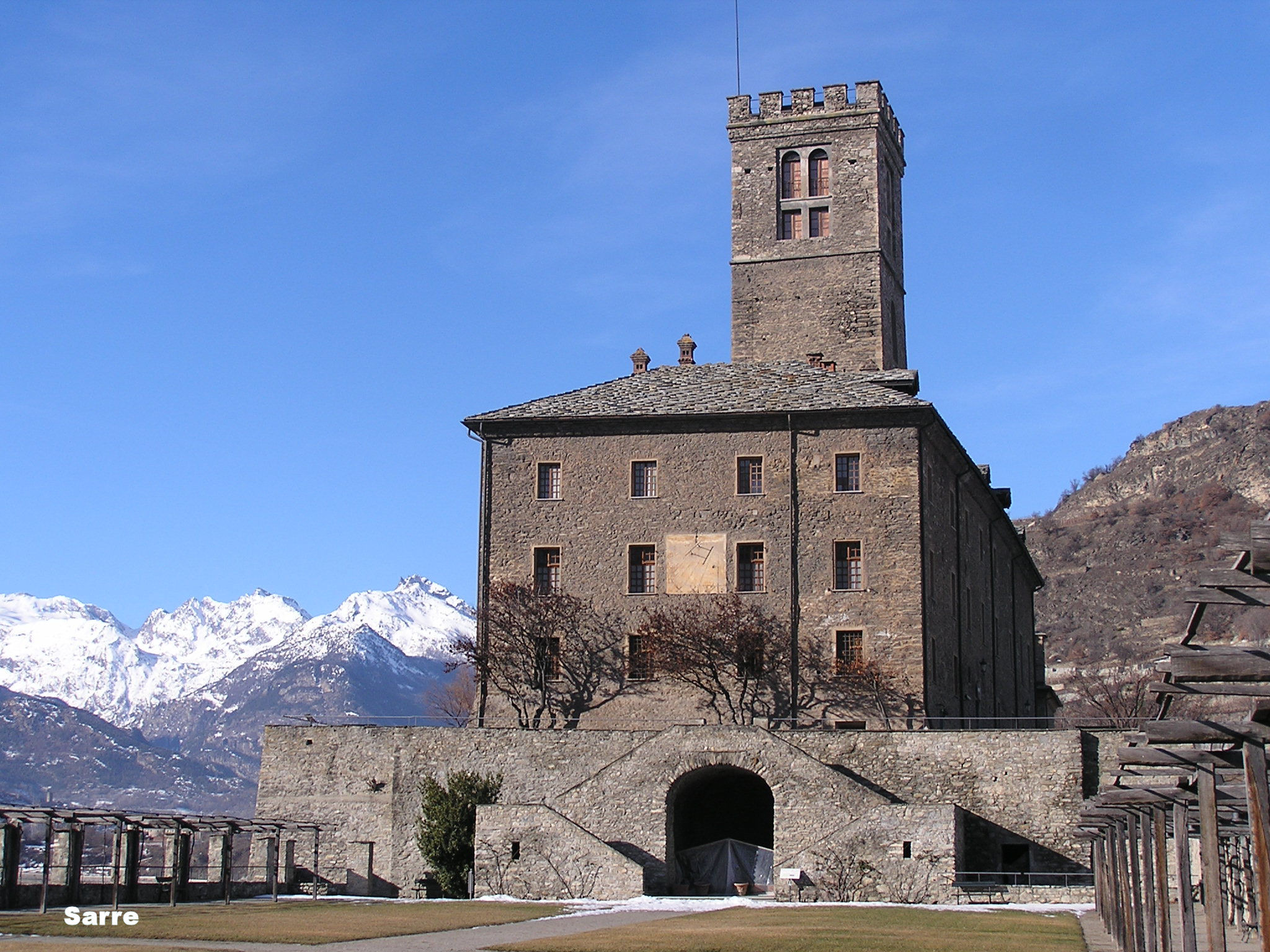
The Sarre Castle

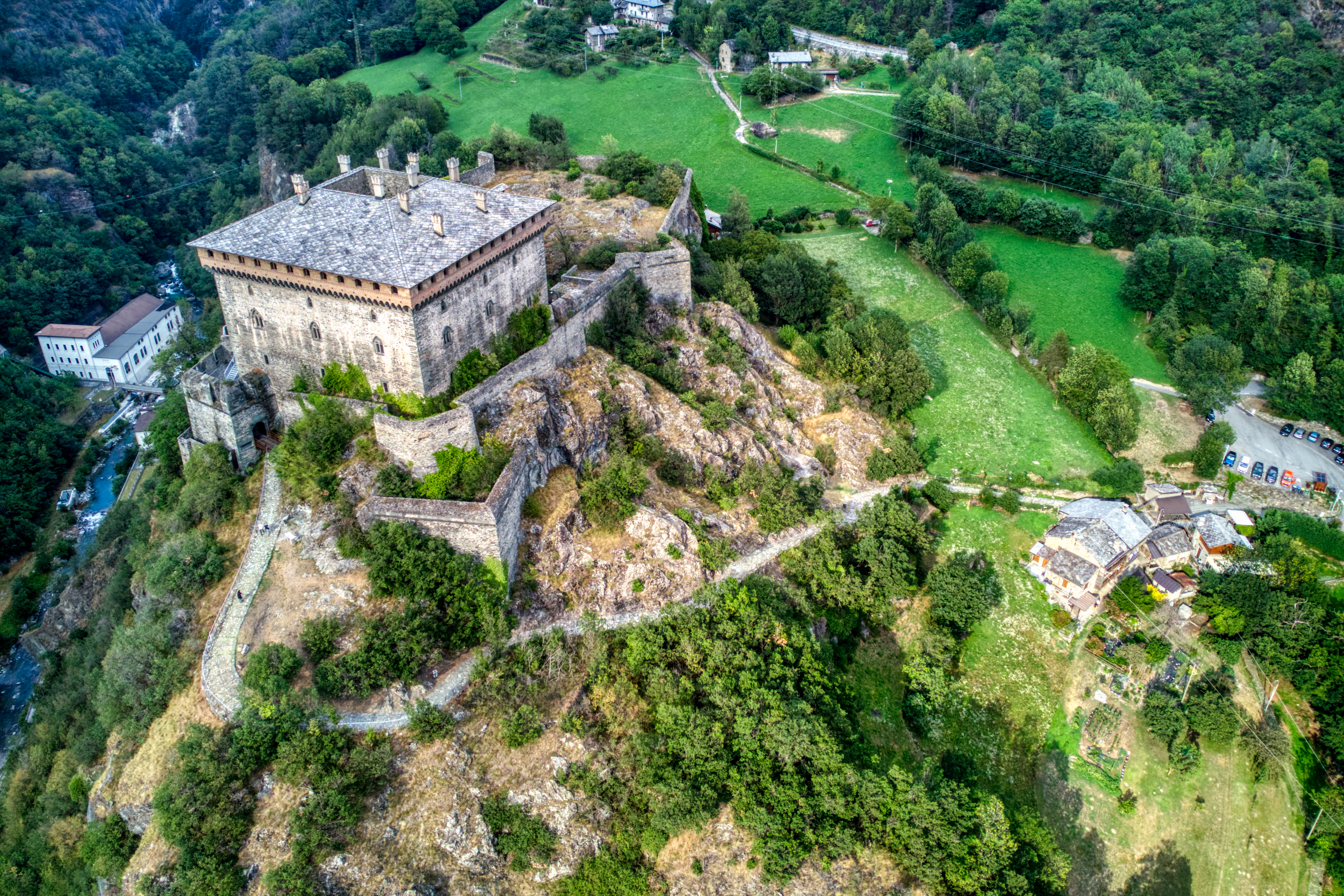
The Verrès Castle

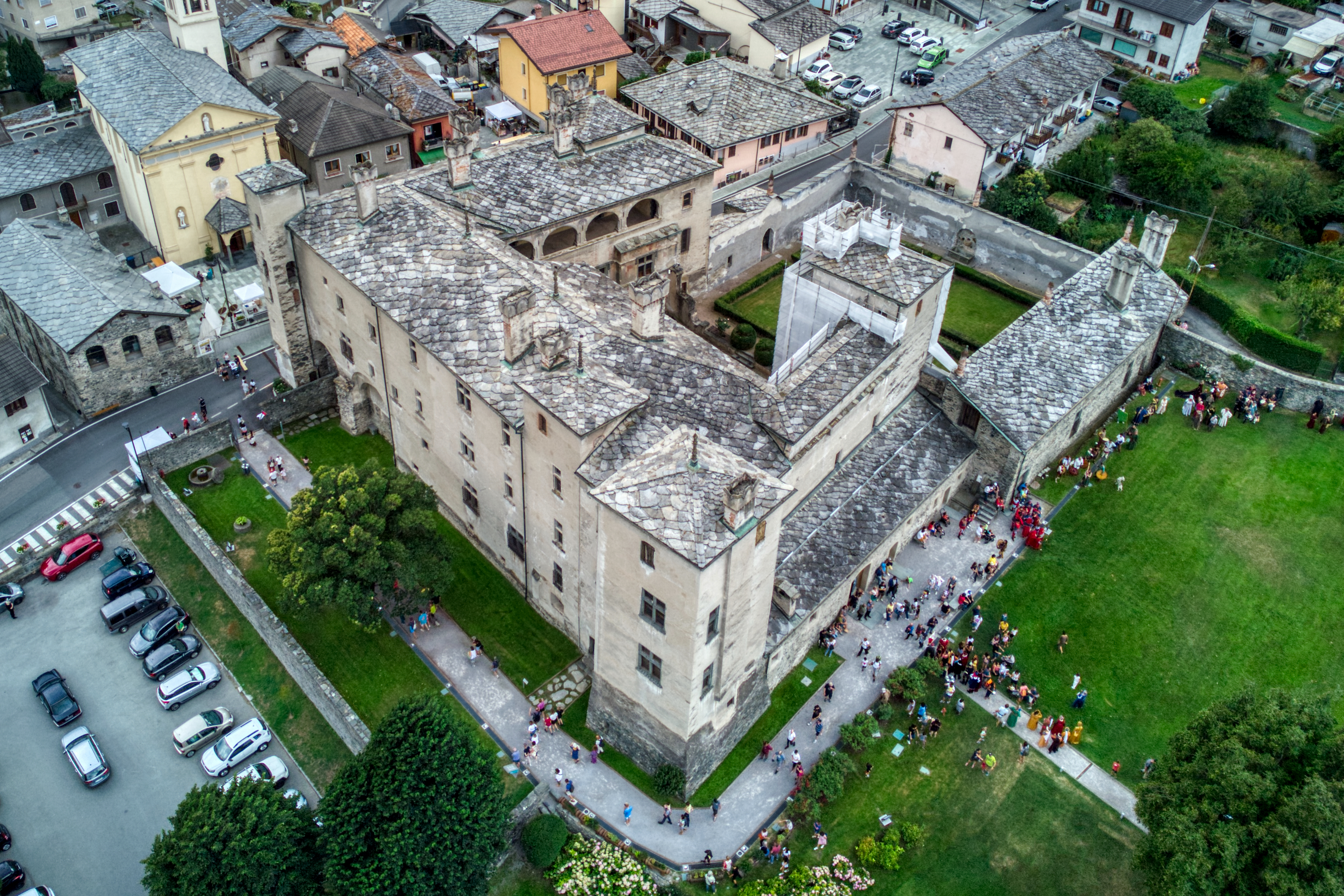
The Issogne Castle

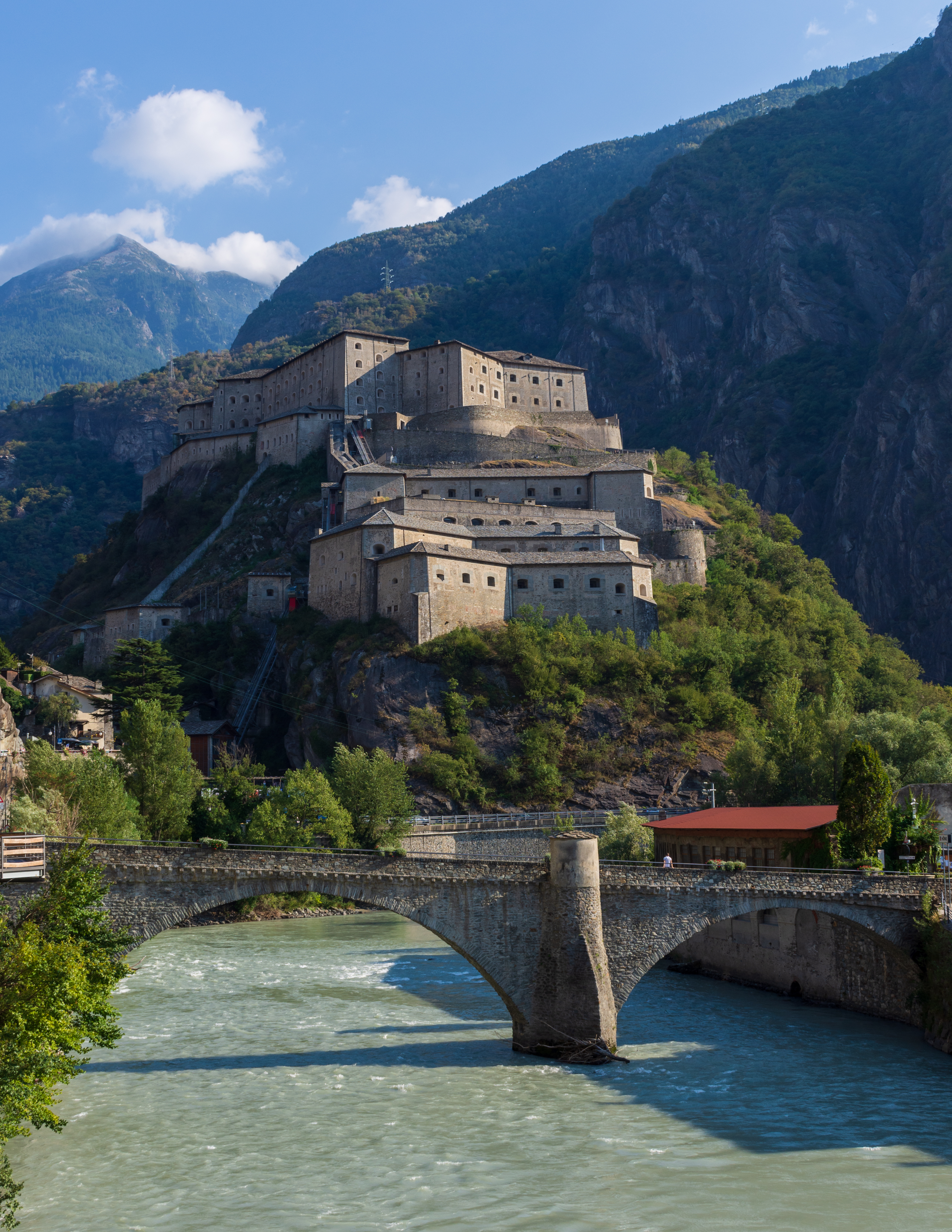
The Bard Fort

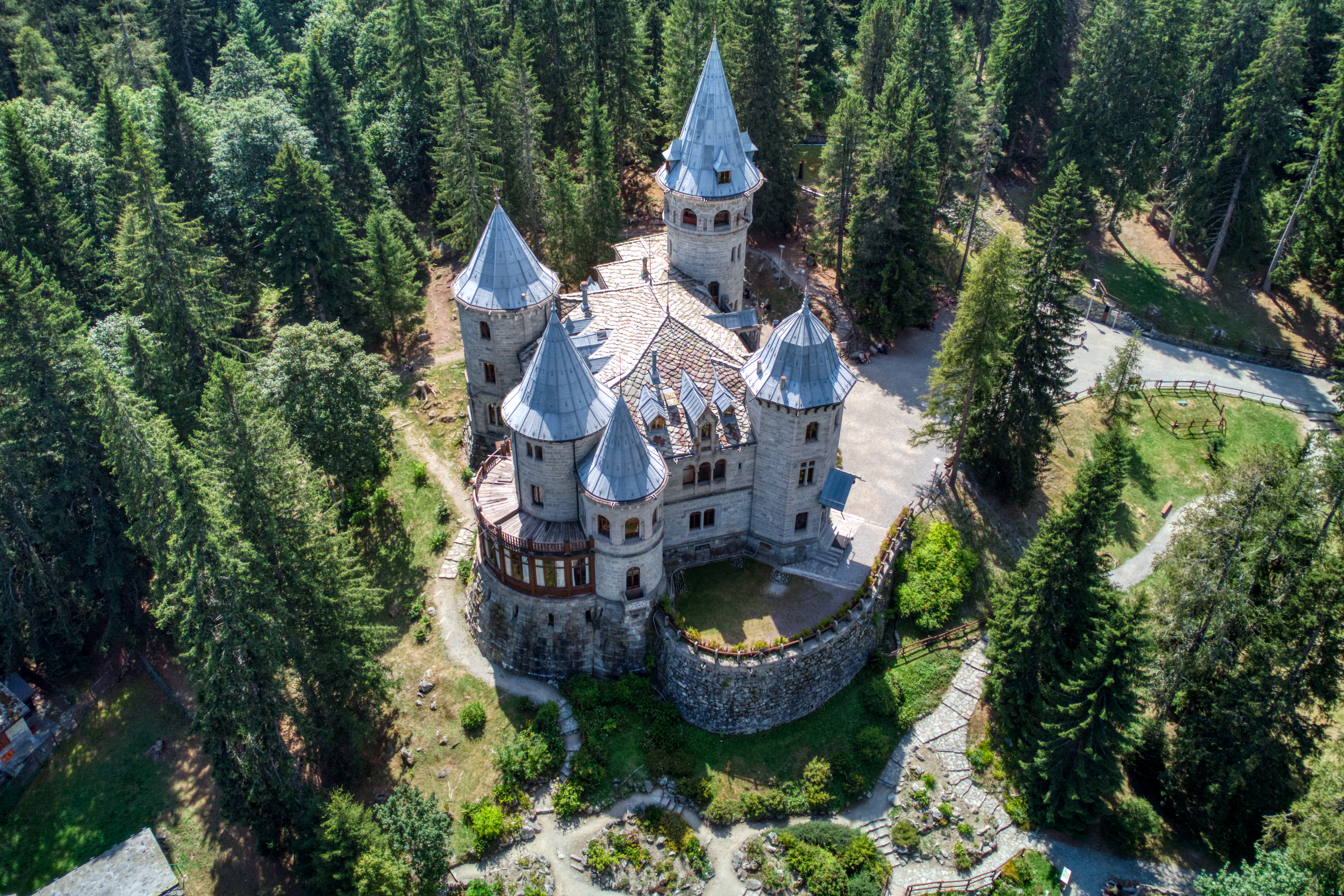
The Savoy Castle

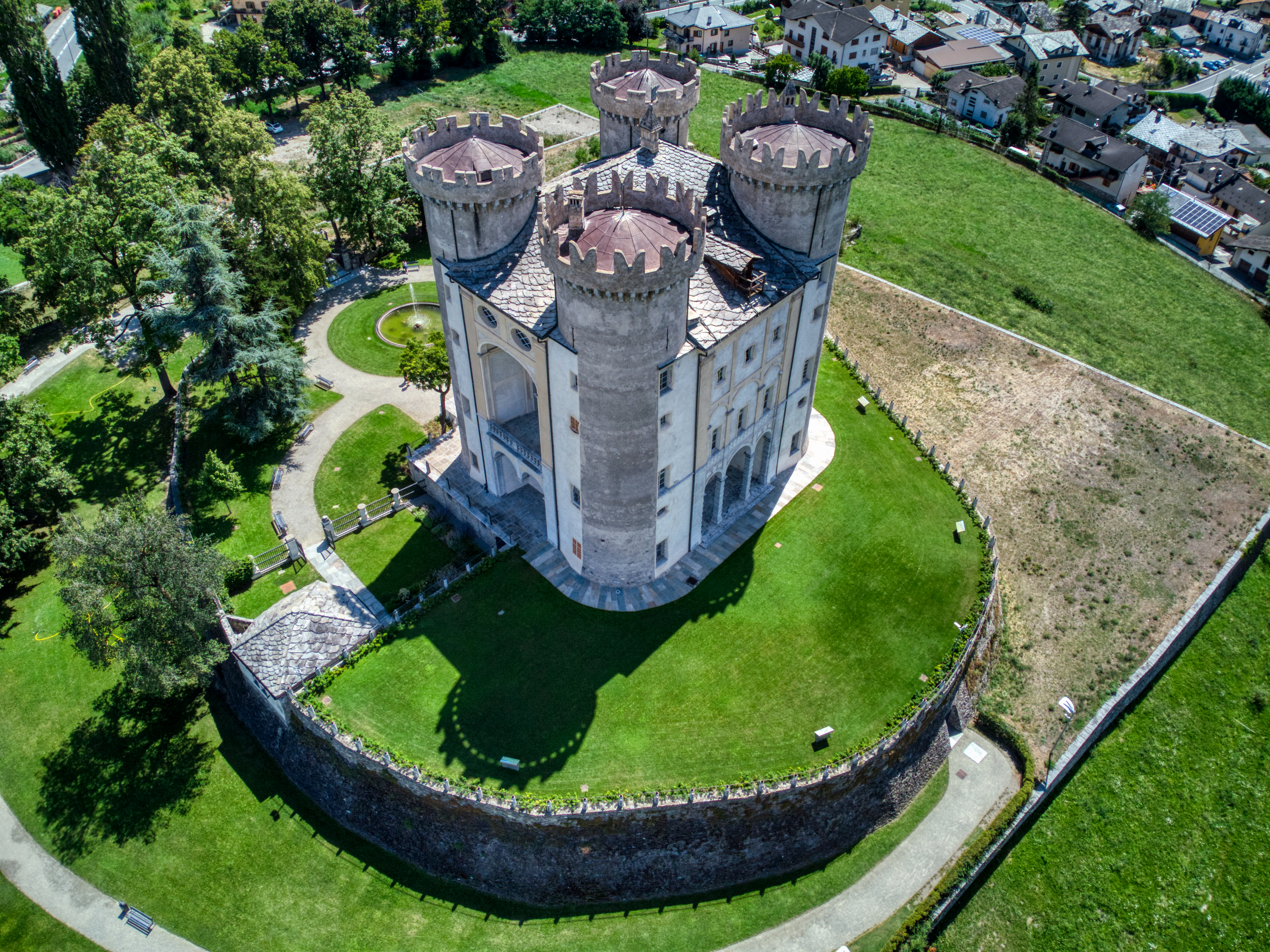
The Aymavilles Castle

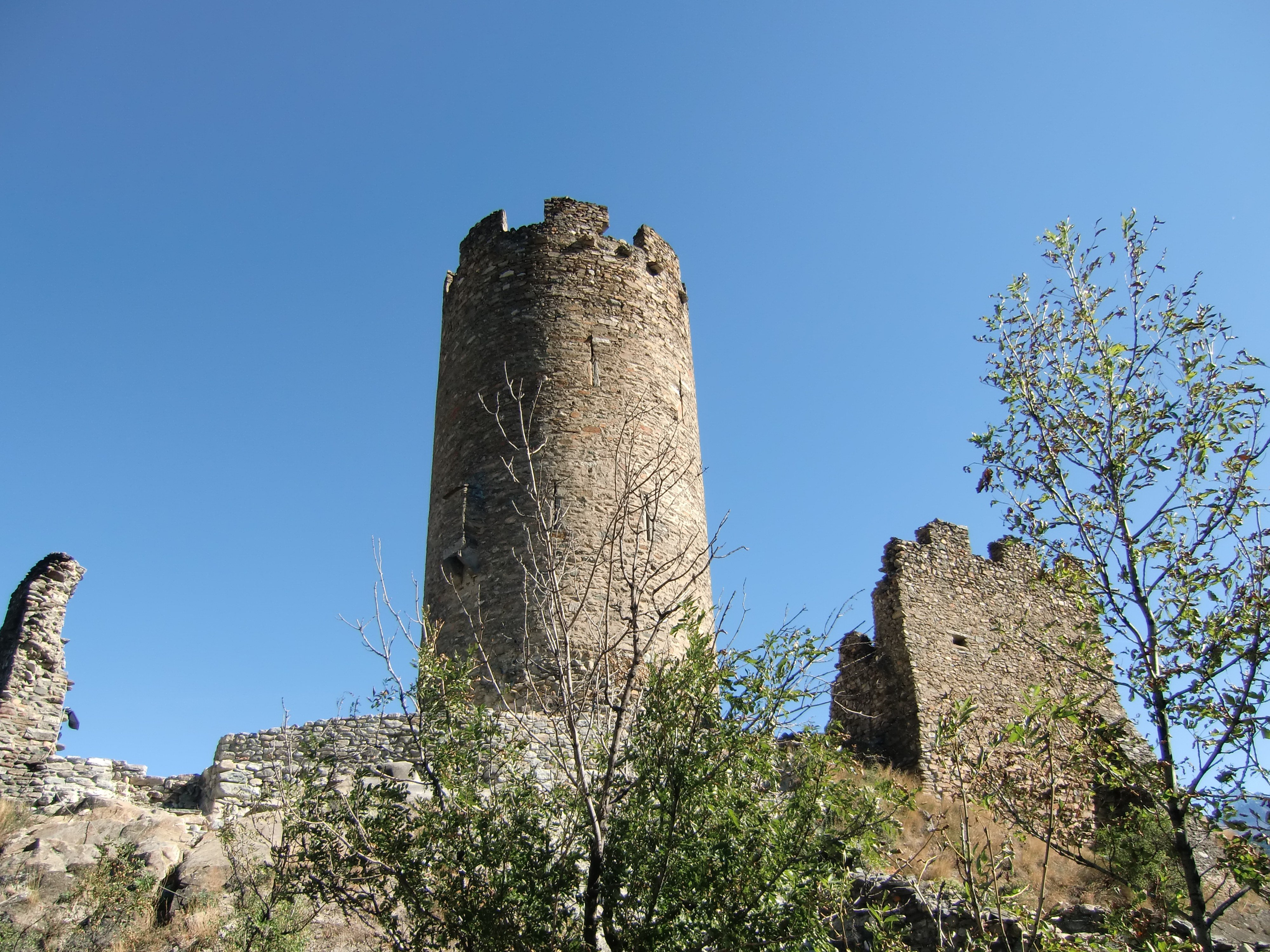
The Châtel-Argent Castle

=== Cuisine ===
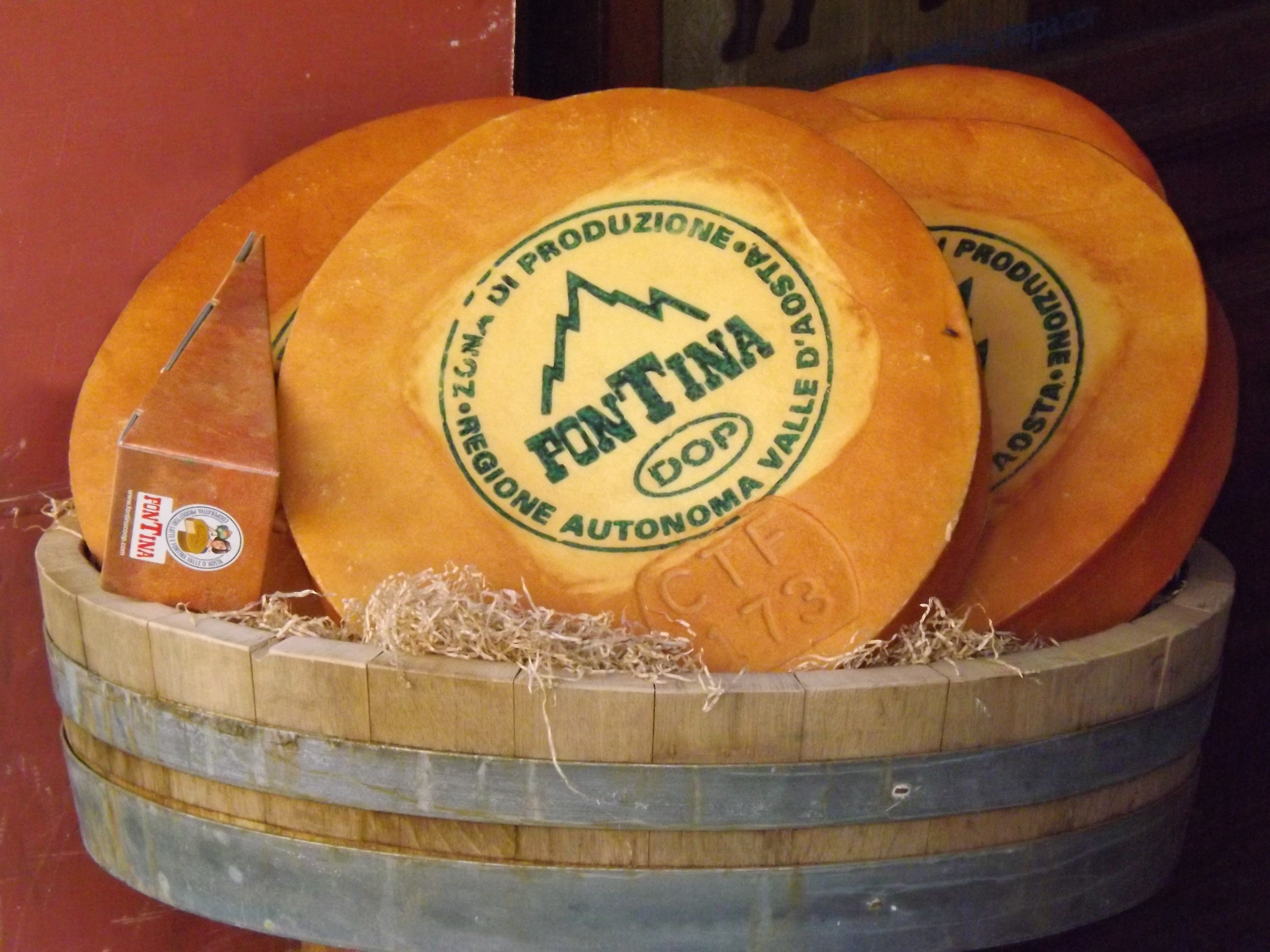
Fontina

The cuisine of Aosta Valley is characterized by simplicity and revolves around "robust" ingredients such as potatoes, polenta; cheese and meat; and rye bread. Many of the dishes involve Fontina, a cheese with PDO status, made from cow's milk that originates from the valley. It is found in dishes such as the soup à la vâpeuleunèntse (Valpelline Soup). Other cheeses made in the region are Tomme de Gressoney and Seras. Fromadzo (Valdôtain for cheese) has been produced locally since the 15th century and also has PDO status.

Regional specialities, besides Fontina, are Motzetta (dried chamois meat), Vallée d'Aoste Lard d'Arnad (a cured and brined fatback product with PDO designation), Vallée d'Aoste Jambon de Bosses (a kind of ham, likewise with PDO designation), a dark bread made with rye, and honey.

Notable dishes include Carbonnade, similar to the Belgian dish of the same name consisting of salt-cured beef cooked with onions and red wine served with polenta; breaded veal cutlets called costolette; teuteuns, salt-cured cow's udder that is cooked and sliced; and steak à la valdôtaine, a steak with croûtons, ham and melted cheese.

== Economy ==
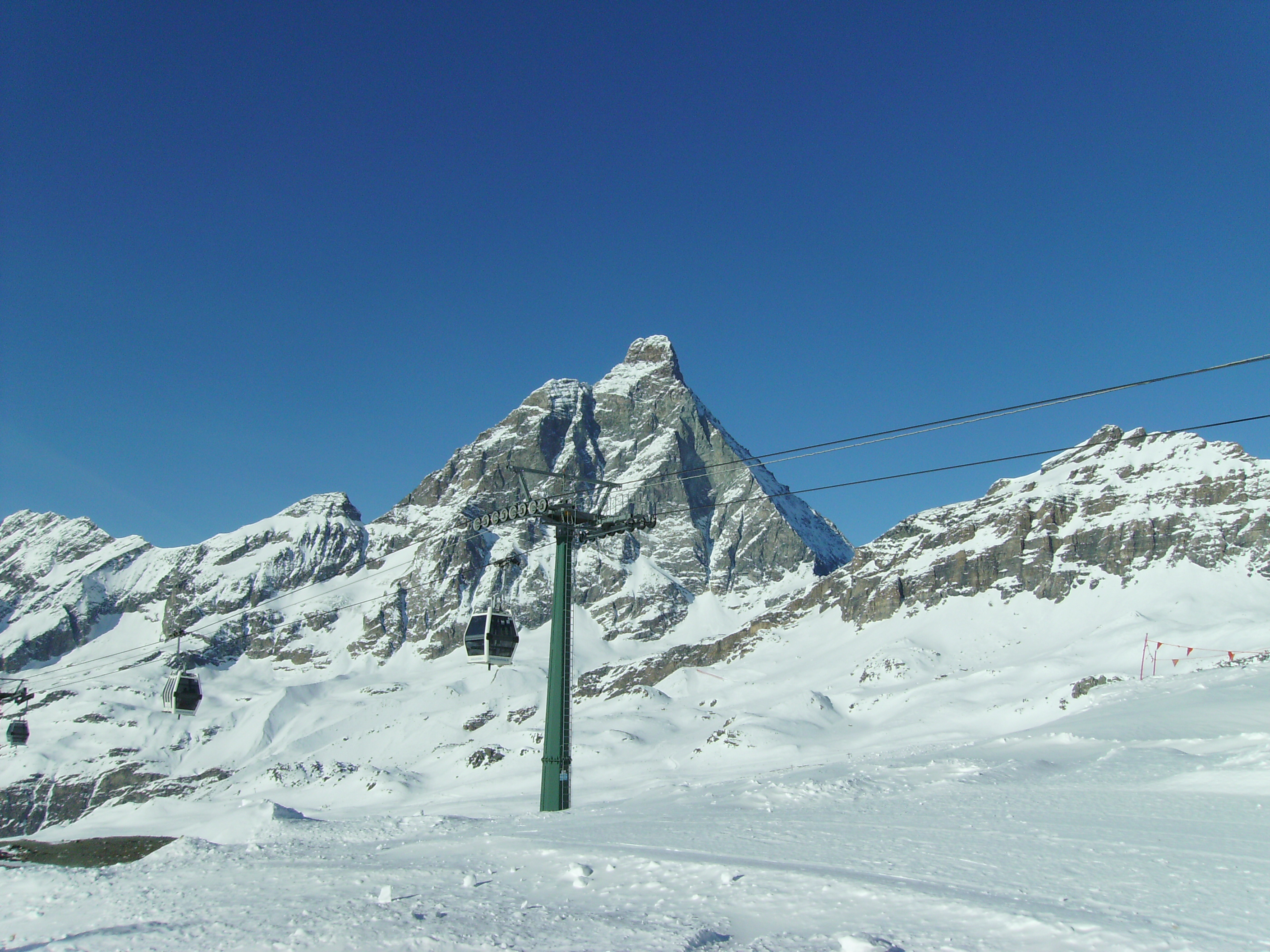
Ski facilities in Breuil-Cervinia and, in the background, the Matterhorn

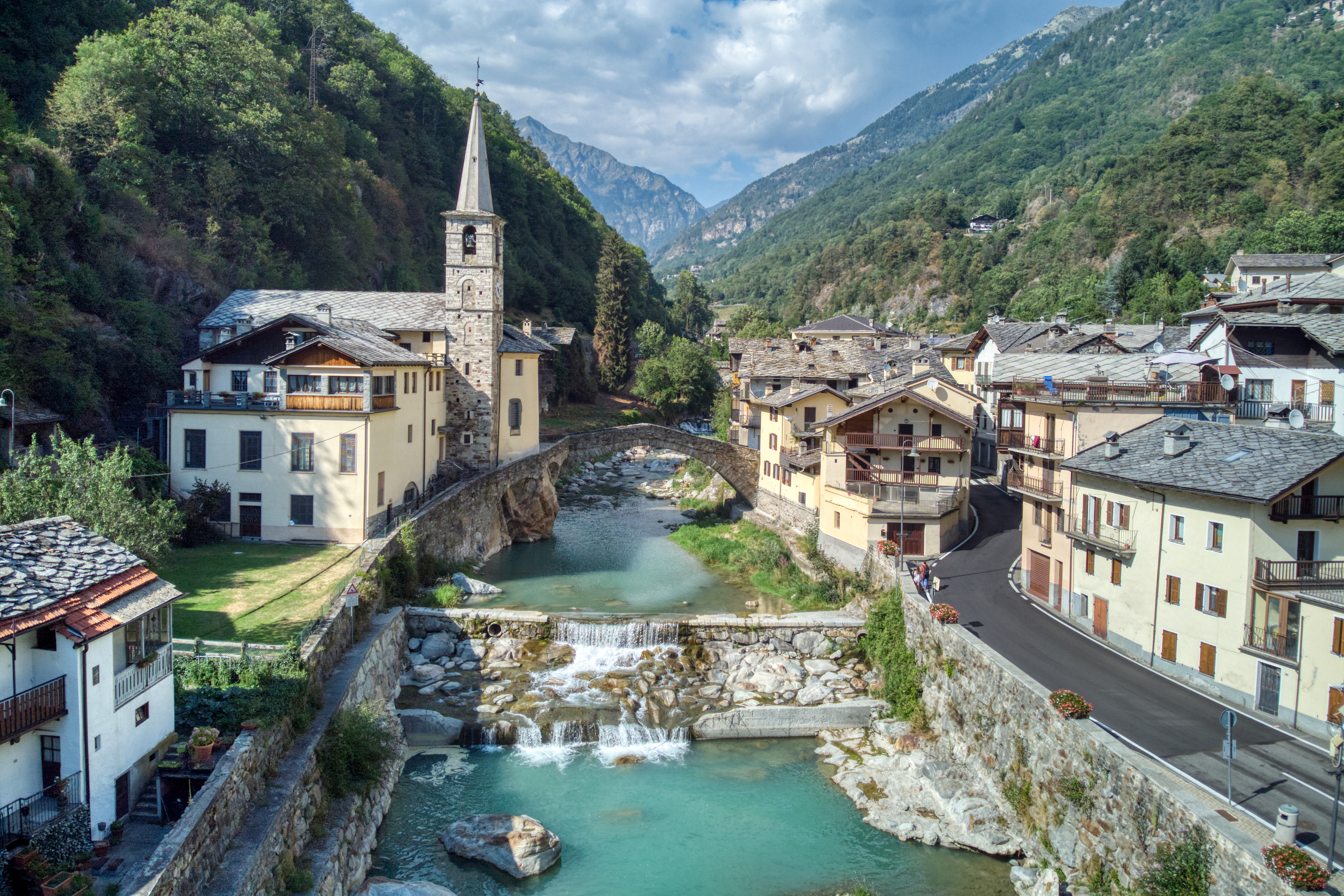
Fontainemore is one of "The Most Beautiful Villages in Italy".

The economy of the Aosta Valley is based above all on the tertiary sector, in particular on tourism. Due to the autonomy conferred by the special statute, the public sector, which administers most of the regional financial resources, plays a role of primary importance in the Aosta Valley economy. The industries are concentrated in the lower valley (between Verrès-Champdepraz and Pont-Saint-Martin) and are often small to medium sized. However, the contribution of agriculture and livestock to the regional economy is modest. Potatoes, apples, vines, barley are grown and cattle are raised. The artisanal production is significant, in which wooden sculpture emerges.

Aosta Valley has many small and picturesque villages, three of them have been selected by I Borghi più belli d'Italia (English: The most beautiful Villages of Italy), a non-profit private association of small Italian towns of strong historical and artistic interest, that was founded on the initiative of the Tourism Council of the National Association of Italian Municipalities. These villages are:

- Bard
- Fontainemore
- Étroubles

Notable wines include two white wines from Morgex (Blanc de Morgex et de La Salle and Chaudelune), a red wine blend from Arvier (Enfer d'Arvier) and one from Gamay. The Valle d'Aosta DOC (or Vallée d'Aoste DOC, in French) is an Italian denominazione di origine controllata located in the Aosta Valley of north-west Italy. Surrounded by the Alps, the Valle d'Aosta is home to the highest elevated vineyards in all of Europe. The principal winemaking region of the Valle d'Aosta is found along the eastern banks of the Dora Baltea (fr., Doire baltée) river with the city of Aosta serving as the central winemaking location. The region is divided into three main vineyard areas; the upper valley, Valdigne, the central valley (locally Valle centrale in Italian, Vallée centrale in French) and the lower valley, (locally Bassa valle in Italian, Basse vallée in French).

== Transport ==
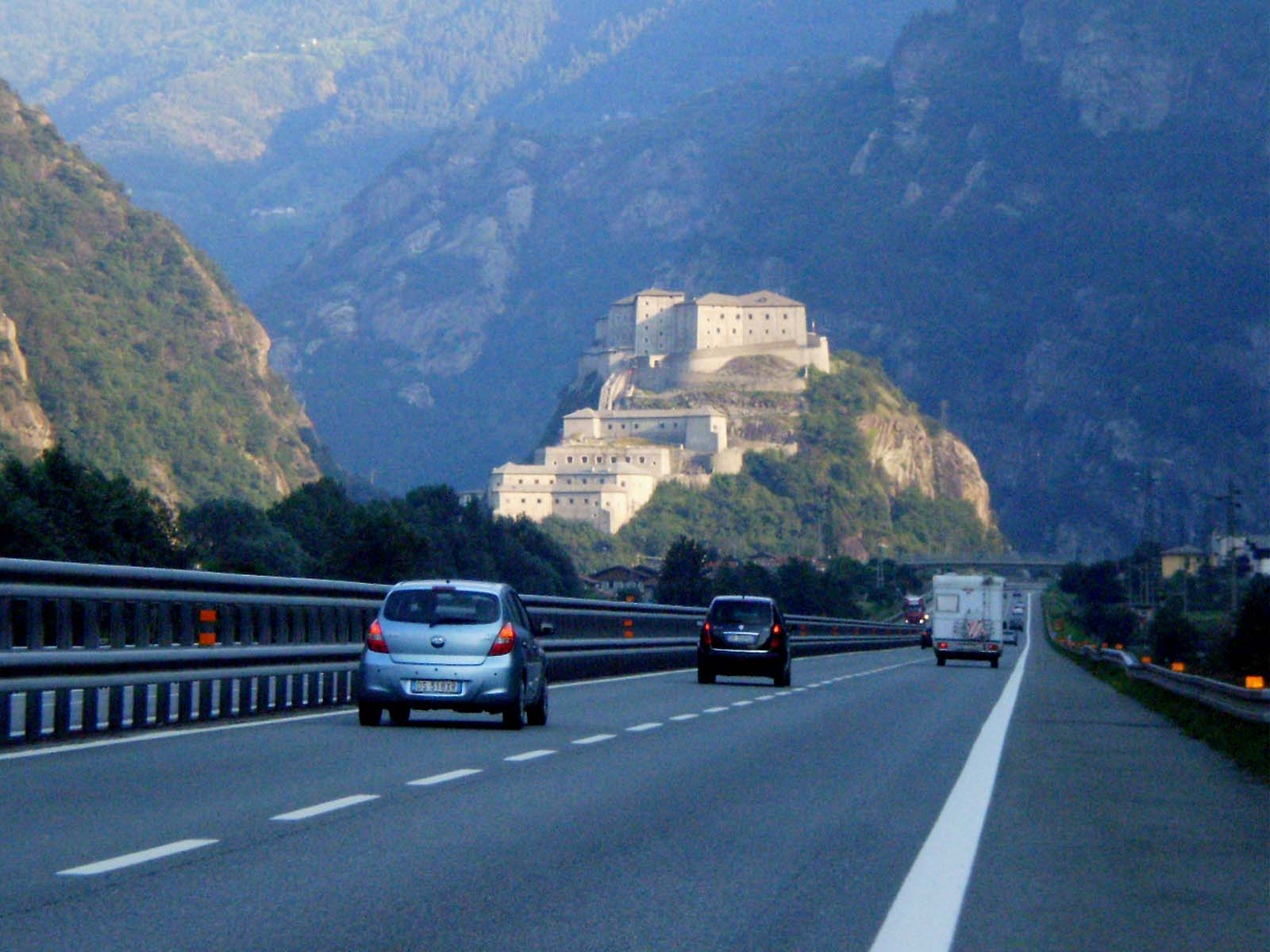
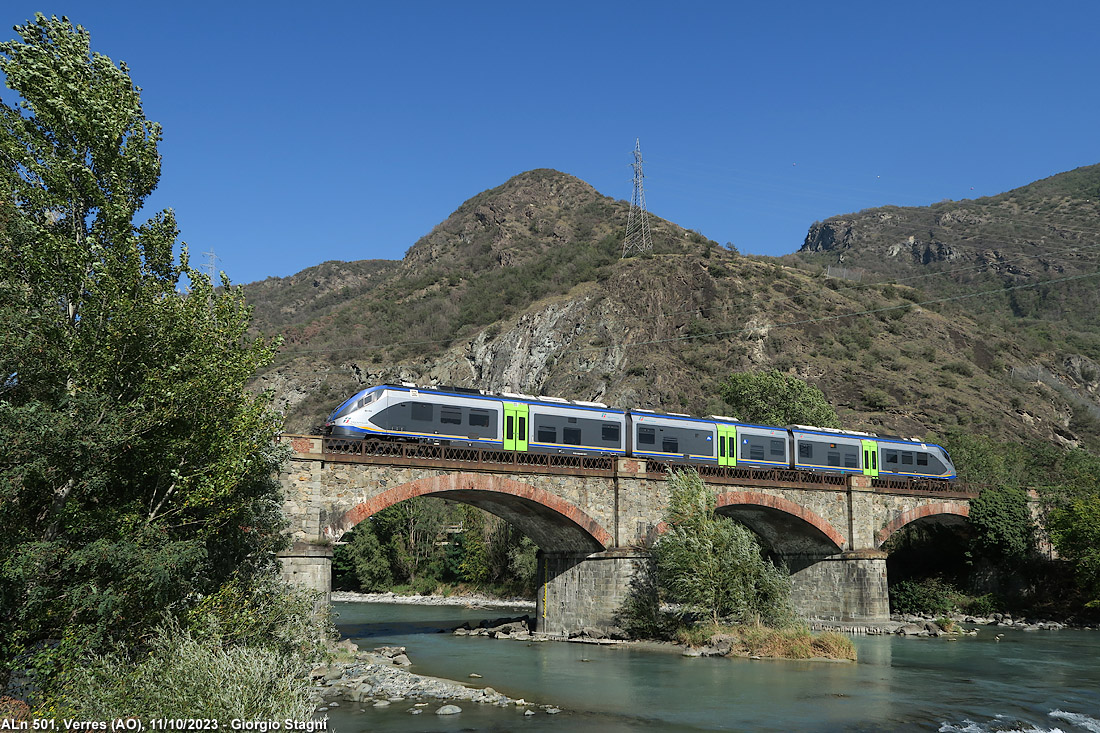
The Autostrada A5 in Aosta Valley near Bard (left) and the Chivasso–Ivrea–Aosta railway in Verrès (right)

The main road axes arise in the valley floor. They are the Aosta Valley state road 26 and the Autostrada A5 (Turin-Aosta-Mont Blanc Tunnel). The Mont Blanc Tunnel connects Courmayeur to Chamonix, France. The Great Saint Bernard Pass connects Saint-Rhémy-en-Bosses with Martigny in Switzerland, while the Little Saint Bernard Pass connects the La Thuile valley with the Isère valley and the municipality of Bourg-Saint-Maurice, in France.

The railway line is the Chivasso–Ivrea–Aosta railway, currently undergoing modernization works, the railway service, therefore, will be carried out from January 2024 with replacement buses. The region's only airport is the Aosta Valley Airport, in Saint-Christophe. However, there are currently no scheduled flight services at the airport. Other airports that are close to region are Turin Airport and Geneva Airport.

== Gallery ==
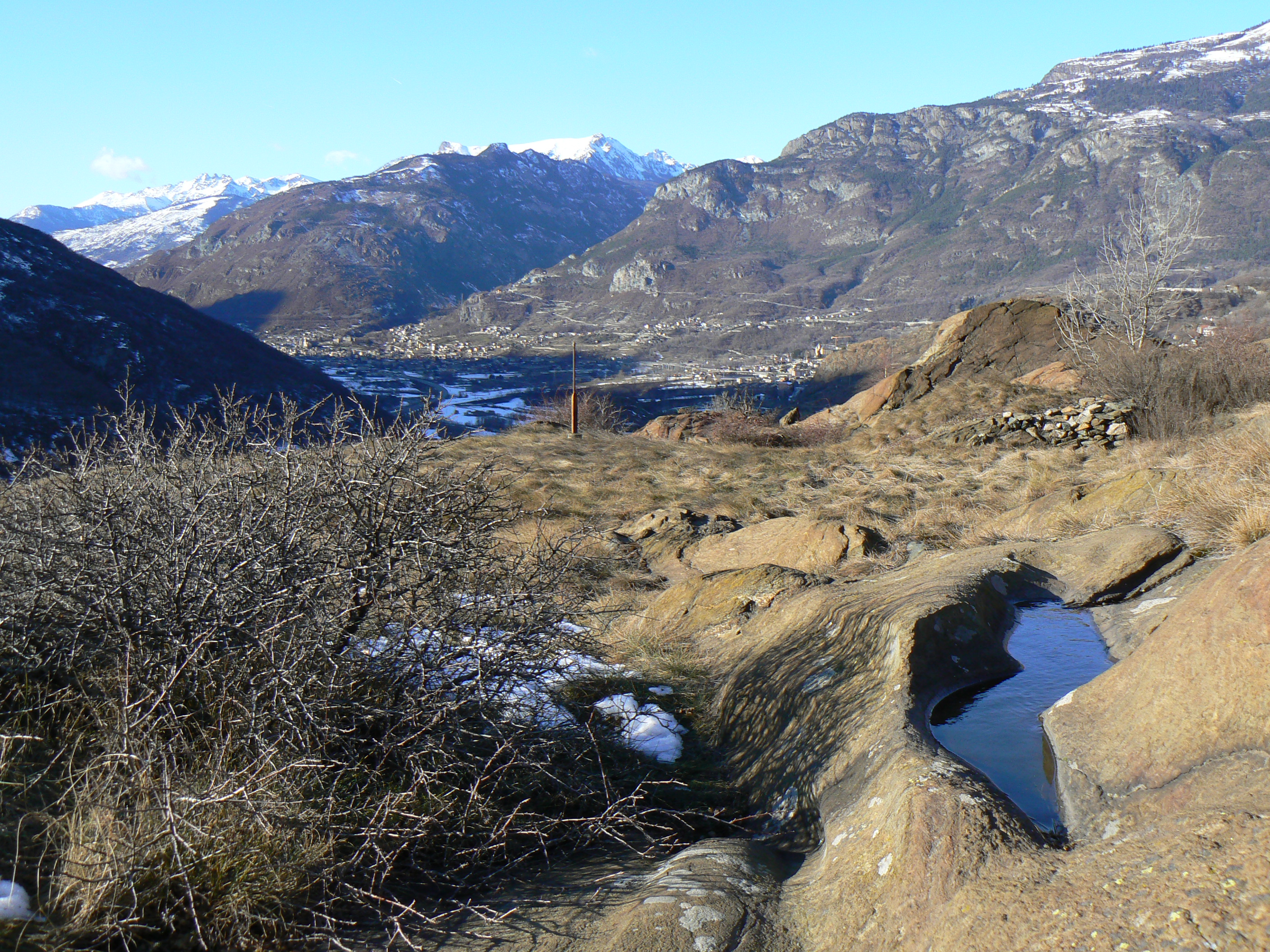
The prehistoric site near Chenal castle, Montjovet, rich in petroglyphs

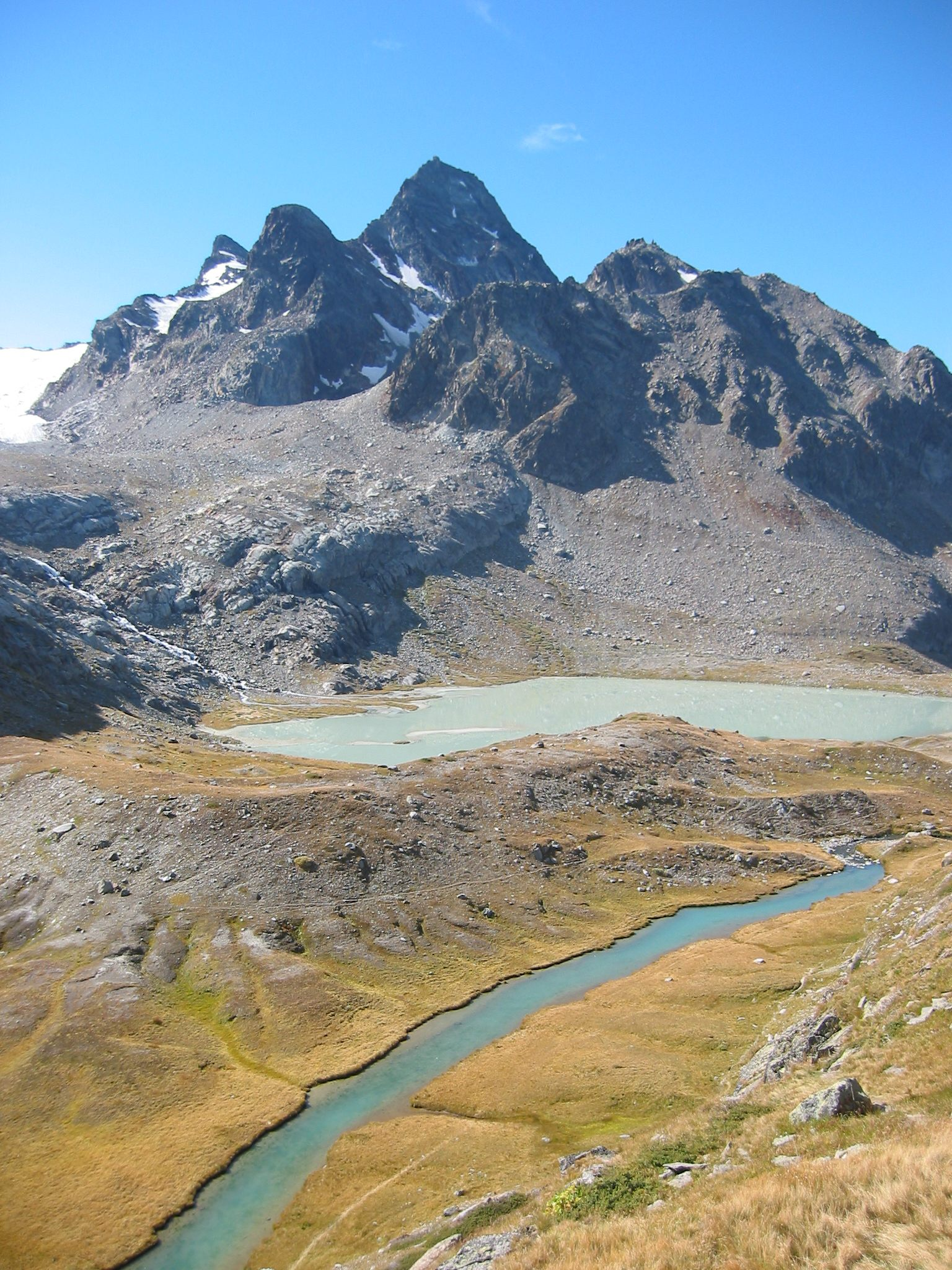
A view from refuge Albert Deffeyes, La Thuile

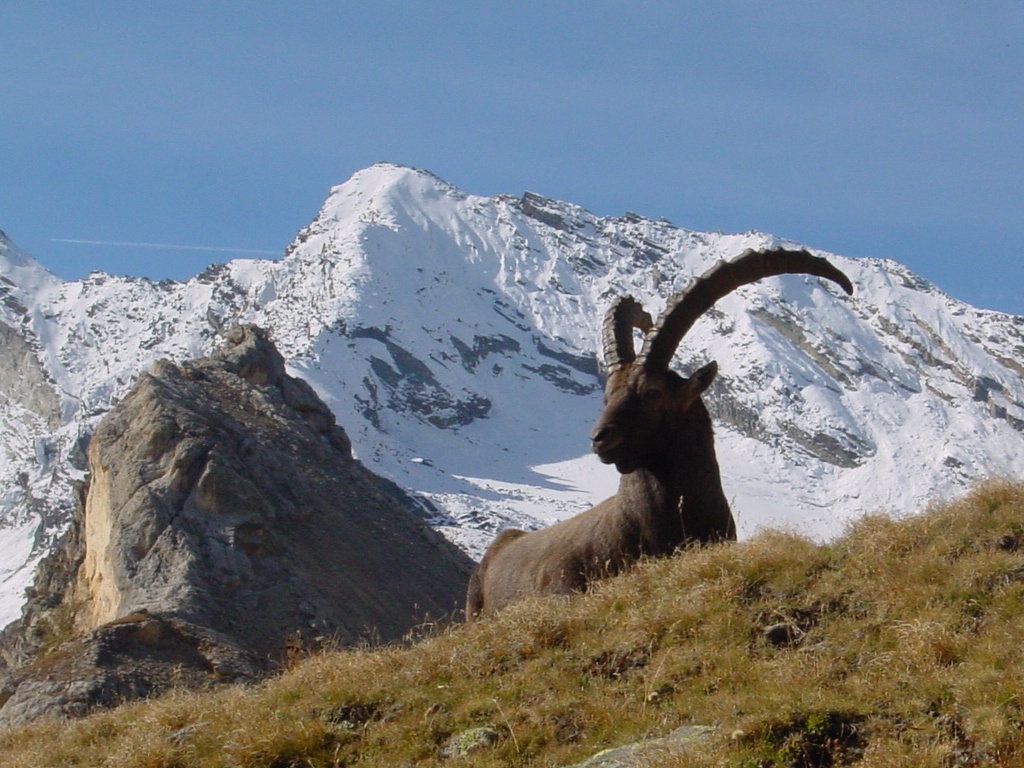
Male Alpine Ibex in Gran Paradiso National Park

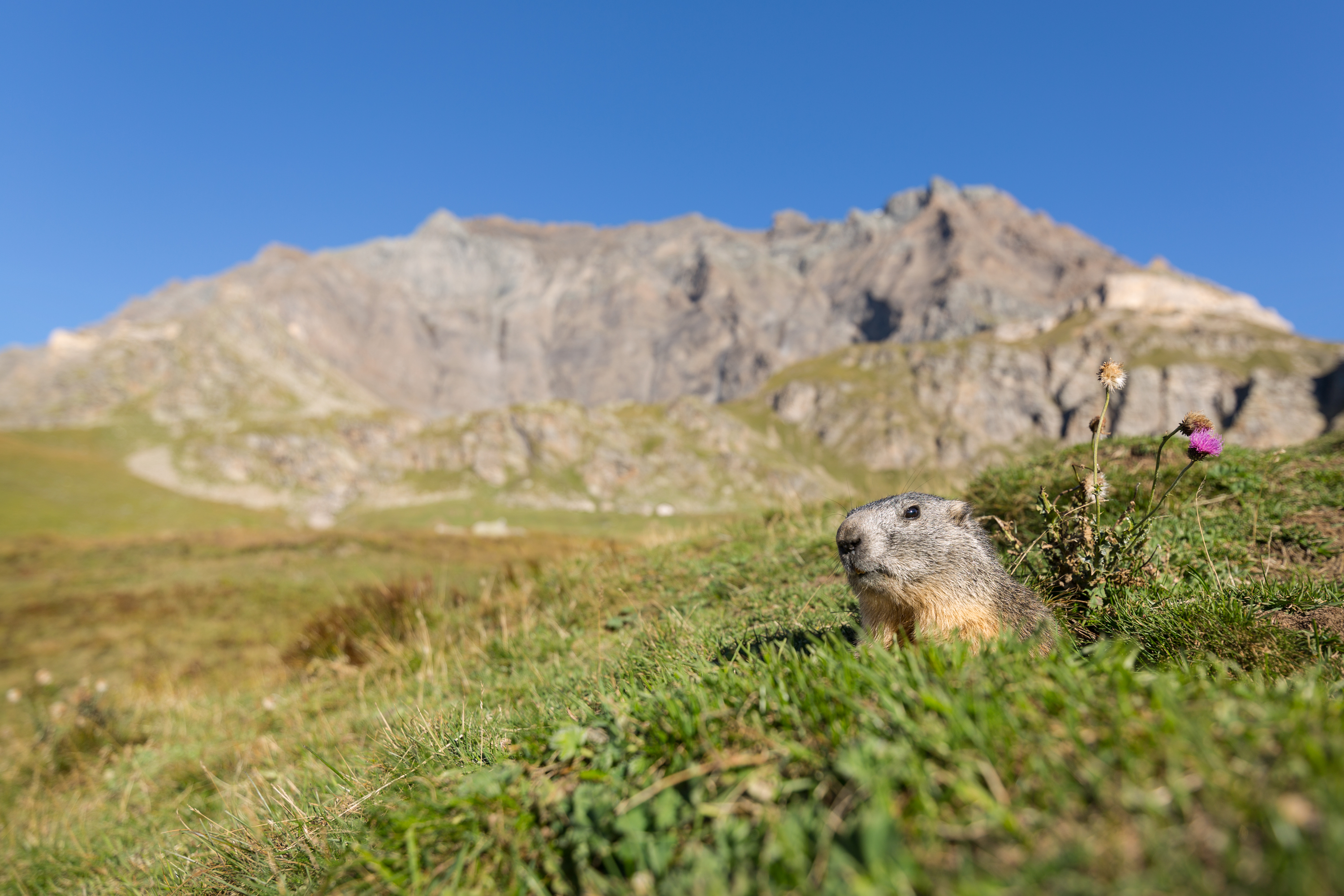
Alpine marmot in Gran Paradiso National Park

== See also ==
- Alps-Mediterranean Euroregion
- Arch of Augustus in Aosta
- Roman Catholic Diocese of Aosta
- Elections in Aosta Valley
- Bard Fort – Museum of the Alps
- Gran Paradiso National Park
- List of presidents of Aosta Valley
- Mont Blanc
- Mont Blanc Tunnel
- Roman bridge Pont d'Aël
- Refuge Grand Tournalin
- Roman Theatre, Aosta
- Lake Perrin

== Sources ==
- Cerutti, Augusta Vittoria, Le Pays de la Doire et son peuple, Quart: éditeur Musumeci
- Colliard, Lin (1976), La culture valdôtaine au cours des siècles, Aoste
- Henry, Joseph-Marie (1967), Histoire de la Vallée d'Aoste, Aoste: Imprimerie Marguerettaz
- Janin, Bernard (1976), Le Val d'Aoste. Tradition et renouveau, Quart: éditeur Musumeci
- Riccarand, Elio, Storia della Valle d'Aosta contemporanea (1919–1945), Aoste: Stylos Aoste
