= Sarre Castle =

Castle in Aosta Valley, Italy

- Castello di Sarre (Italian); Château de Sarre (French)
- Sarre, Aosta Valley, Italy
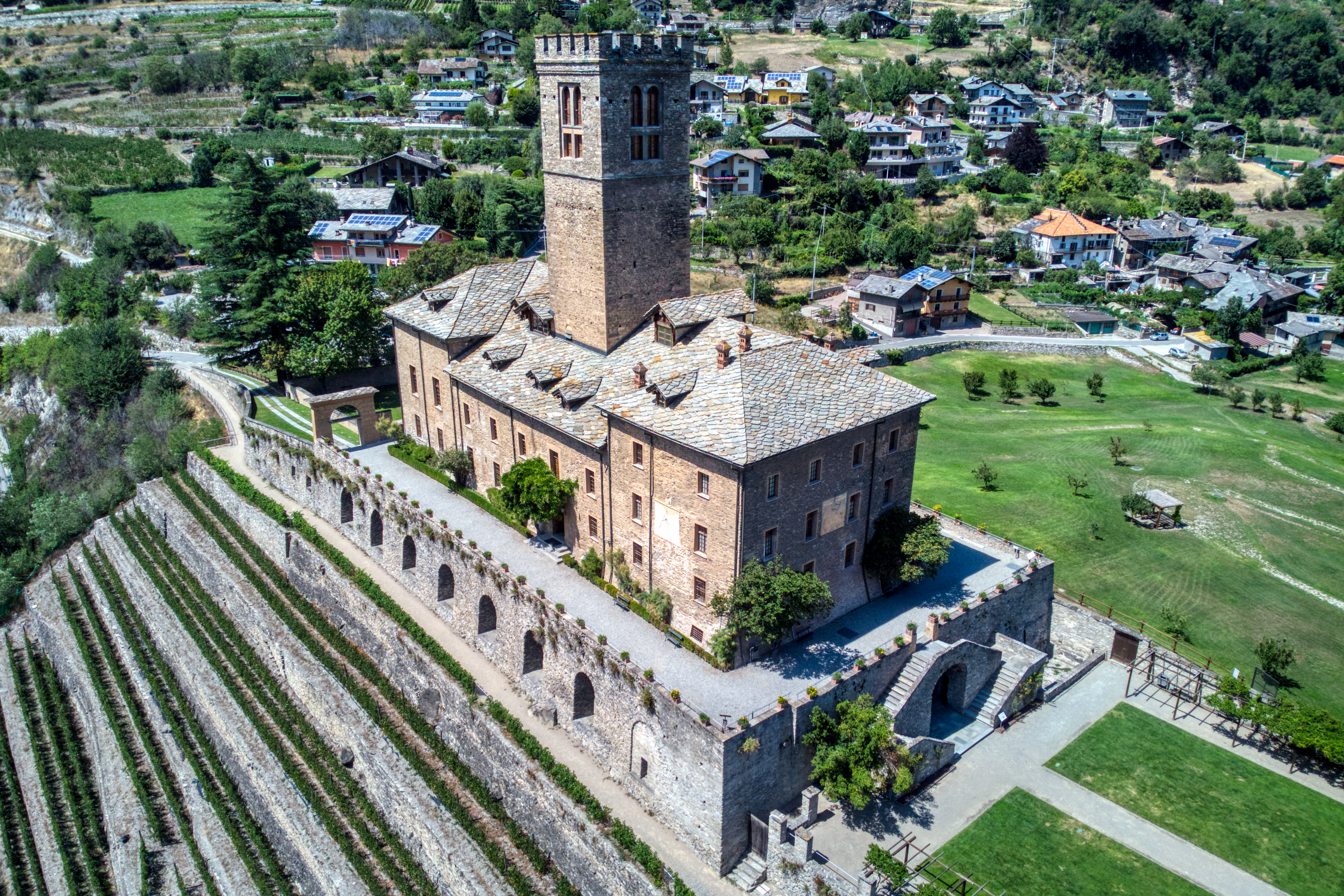
- Sarre Castle in 2023

Site information
- Type: Castle

Location
- Coordinates: 45°42′46.1″N 7°15′09.4″E

Sarre Castle (Italian: Castello di Sarre, French: Château de Sarre) is a castle located in Sarre, Aosta Valley, Italy.

== History ==
News of a fortified house or perhaps a simple tower guarding the territory dates back to the 13th century. There is evidence that in 1242, the building hosted an important meeting between Amadeus IV, Count of Savoy and Godefroy I of Challant to agree on how to counter the rebellion of Hugues of Bard, the local lord. This alliance resulted in the assignment of the castle to his nephew Jacques of Bard, who was uninvolved in the revolt, along with the title of Count of Sarre, making him the founder of a new dynasty.

After the Sarre lineage became extinct, in 1364 Amadeus VI, Count of Savoy granted the fief and its fortified house to Henri of Quart. However, upon his death in 1377, the castle returned to the House of Savoy, who entrusted it to the new feudal lord Thibaud de Montagny only in 1405.

From then on, the castle saw the succession of various noble families, including the barons Genève-Lullin, the Leschaux, the La Crête, the Roncas, and the Rapet.

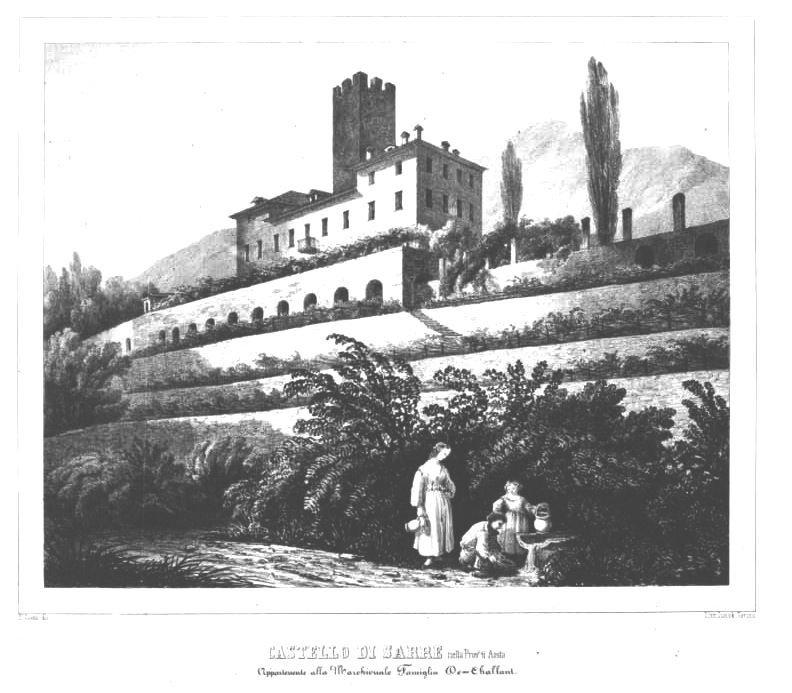
A lithograph of Sarre Castle

In 1708, the castle was purchased by Jean-François Ferrod d'Arvier, an ambitious man who had amassed wealth through military supplies and the exploitation of copper mines in Ollomont. To showcase his prosperity, he had the castle entirely rebuilt, giving it its current appearance, sparing only the tower from reconstruction. However, in 1730, following his financial collapse, a mortgage on the castle allowed the previous owners, the legitimate heirs of the Rapet family, to reclaim the manor. Later, ownership passed to the Nicole de Bard family and then to the Gerbore family.

The castle became the property of the House of Savoy in 1869 when King Victor Emmanuel II acquired it, also assuming the title of Count of Sarre. He commissioned further expansions, the elevation of the central tower, and the construction of the stables, aiming to transform the castle into one of his primary seasonal hunting residences. The "Roi Chasseur" (King Hunter) frequented the castle often due to the important hunting expeditions in the nearby valleys of Cogne, Valsavarenche, and Rhêmes that once constituted his personal hunting reserve and are now part of the vast Gran Paradiso National Park.

The castle was also frequently visited by his successor, Umberto I of Italy, who decorated it with numerous hunting trophies, still visible in the Trophy Gallery and museum collection. His wife, Margherita of Savoy, stayed at the castle only once, during the summer of 1880, preferring instead to reside at the nearby Savoy Castle, which she had built in Gressoney-Saint-Jean.

The Princes of Piedmont, Umberto II of Italy and his wife Marie-José of Belgium, were also frequent visitors to Sarre. After modernizing its interiors in 1935, they used the castle as a seasonal residence for their numerous alpine excursions. It also served as a refuge for Princess Maria-José and her children during the most challenging periods of World War II.

The castle remained the property of the House of Savoy until 1972 when it was purchased by the Italian state. In 1989, it was entrusted to the Aosta Valley Region, which carried out extensive restoration work before opening it to the public.

== Description ==
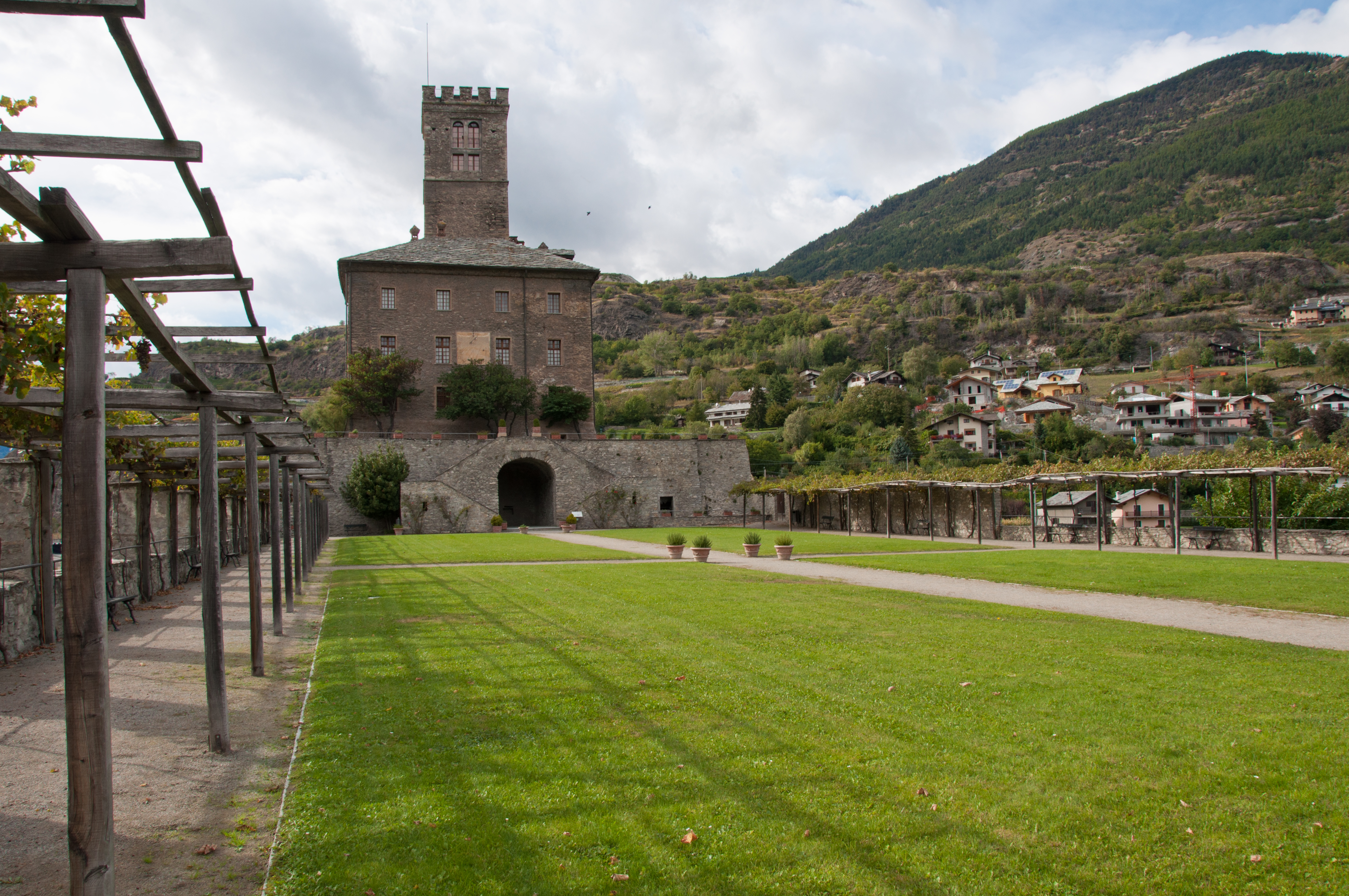
Eastern view

Composed of a longitudinal structure overlooking a hill with evident terracing that drops steeply towards the A5 motorway headed towards the Mont Blanc, the castle is characterized by a tall, crenelated rectangular tower with mullioned windows rising at the center of the structure. The building stands three stories high and features a uniform stone cladding, closely resembling many other castles in the region.

Adjacent to the main building but within the fortified walls that enclose the entire property, there is a small royal chapel with a single nave, adorned with simple decorations and an altar clearly inspired by the Baroque style.

The rear façade of the castle overlooks a vast grassy courtyard, flanked on both sides by walkways and by the stable complex commissioned by Victor Emmanuel II.
