= Matheysine =

French Natural region in the Alps

Coordinates: 44°58′N 5°47′E

Matheysine (French pronunciation: [matezin]) is a French Natural region located in the Alps at the south of the Isère département. Its relief is a plateau surrounded by mountains. Matheysine is also called Plateau Matheysin.

Matheysine from Sommet du Serre de l'Horizon, minor summit on Sénépy mountain

== Geography ==
The Plateau Matheysin is located in the Isère département, 30 km south of Grenoble when heading to Gap. Included in the overall Taillefer Massif, its average elevation is 1,000 m.

Vercors and Mont Aiguille viewed from summit of Sénépy mountain

Belonging to south-Dauphiné, it is crossed over by the 45th parallel north and roughly matches the boundaries of the former canton of La Mure. It is around 20 km long from north to south and around 13 km wide from east to west. At the south and at the west, the border of the plateau is marked by the river Drac, which defines the boundary with Trièves (at the south) and with the Vercors Plateau (at the west). At the north, the plateau ends at the Laffrey slope down to the Romanche valley at the elevation of 350m. At the east, the small mountain range including the summits of Grand Serre (elev. 2,141m.) and Tabor (elev. 2,389m.) marks the boundary with the Valbonnais canton.

Beside these mountains, the plateau is crossed over from north to south by the summits of the Connest Mountain (Peyrouse, Connex) and of the Sénépy. These mountains overlook a succession of four lakes of glacier origin called the Laffrey lakes. From north to south, these lakes are composed of the lac Mort, the Grand lac de Laffrey, the Petichet lake, the Pierre-Châtel lake. Close to the Pierre-Châtel lake can be found one of the so-called Seven Wonders of Dauphiné, a natural arch called the Pierre Percée.

La Mure is Matheysine's main city.

== Climate ==
On this plateau, shaped by glaciers during the previous glacial periods and surrounded by high mountain ranges, the bise wind blows intensely, being frosty during Winter, but pleasant in Summer. Furthermore, at Winter time, the area can face heavy snowfalls.

For these reasons, Matheysine is being nicknamed Little Siberia.

== History ==
=== Etymology ===
The area has been called Mathaysana (11th century) and later Mataisine (13th century) and Mattacena (14th century), which could possibly be derived from Matta ("to be wet") and Cena ("plateau"). This depicts actually rather well both the geography and the climatic characteristics of the place.

The inhabitants of Matheysine are called Matheysins.

=== Napoléon I in Matheysine ===
The alpine road used by emperor Napoléon I, after having landed at Juan-les-Pins on his return from Elba, crosses Matheysine. There, in a prairie located along the shore of Grand lac de Laffrey, at the place now called Prairie de la Rencontre (Meeting Prairie), the emperor and his troops (1,100 men led by 3 generals) met the royal army sent in order to stop them. Napoléon succeeded in rallying his opponents to his cause and could finally proceed to Grenoble. An equestrian statue of Napoléon still reminds this event.

=== Coal mining ===
The history of Matheysine has been strongly impacted by coal mining. This coal, of superior quality (anthracite) but in thin veins, was extracted from the beginning of the 19th century until the late 1990s. It has highly contributed to the reputation of the plateau.

== Economic characteristics ==
Matheysine has been going through an economic reconversion since the planned decline and the cessation of the coal mining activity on the plateau.

New industries installations have been favoured through aids and fiscal easy terms. Tourism, as well as local craft industry, also help at renewing Matheysine's economic health.

Furthermore, the area presently experiences the arrival of urban people from the Grenoble built-up area, looking for more affordable real estate costs whilst keeping on working downtown. This phenomenon is partly contributing to a revival of the local trade.

== See also ==
- Dauphiné Alps
