= Lac de Pierre-Châtel =

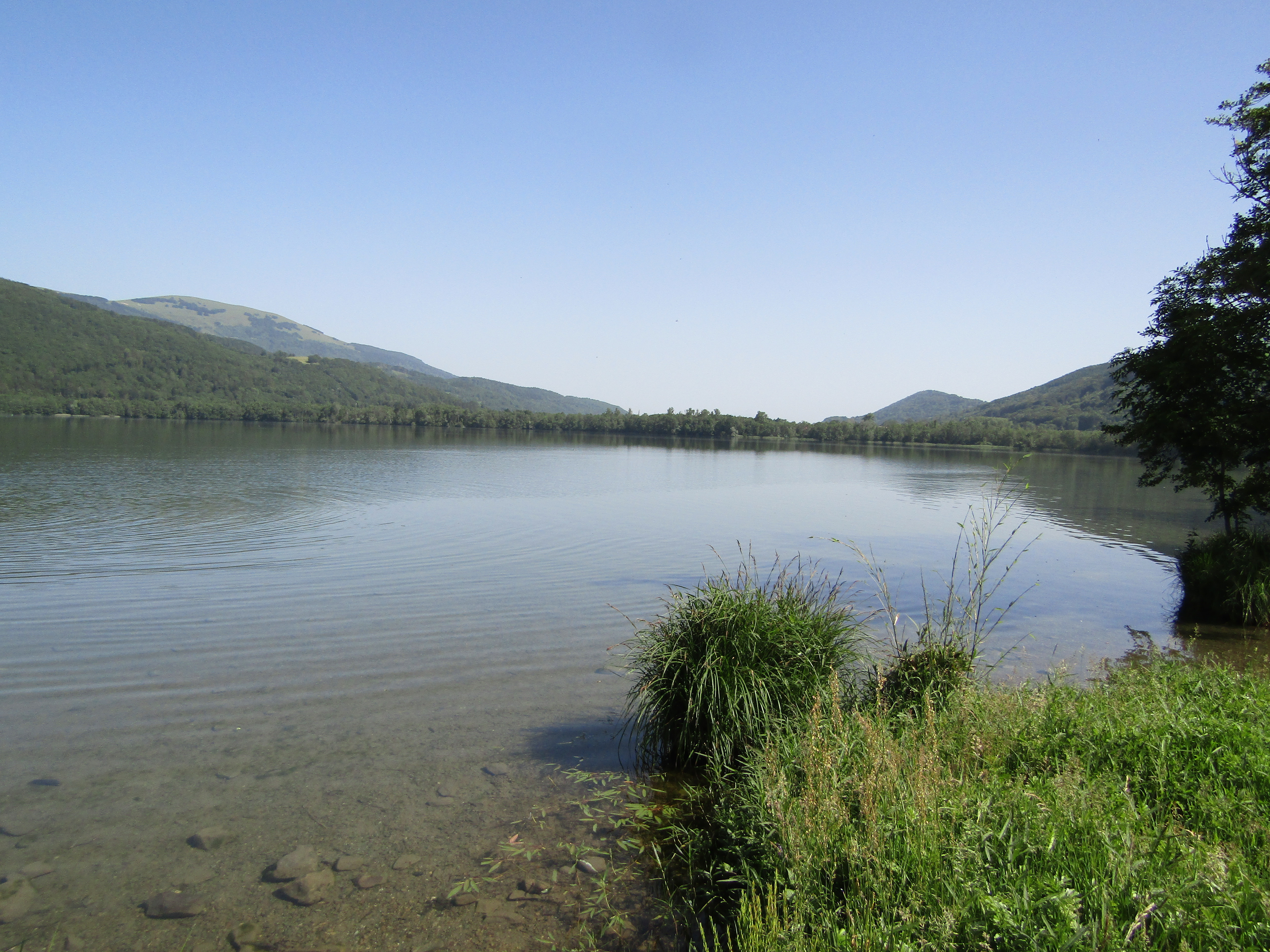

- Location within France
- Location: Isère
- Coordinates: 44°58′25″N 5°46′40″E
- Basin countries: France
- Surface area: 1.4 km^{2} (0.54 sq mi)
- Surface elevation: 930 m (3,050 ft)

Lac de Pierre-Châtel is a lake between Pierre-Châtel and Saint-Théoffrey in the Isère department of France. Its surface area is 1.4 km^{2}.

In the North are the Lac de Pétichet and the Grand lac de Laffrey.
