= Boniface I of Challant =

Nobleman of Aosta Valley, Italy

Boniface I of Challant (French: Boniface I^{er} de Challant, Italian: Bonifacio I di Challant; died 26 February 1426) was a nobleman of Aosta Valley, Italy, a member of the Challant family who was lord of Fénis.

== Biography ==
He was the elder son of Aymon of Challant and inherited the lordship of Fénis, including Fénis castle (whose enlargement he continued). In 1381 he married Françoise of Roussillon, daughter of count James of Roussillon and received as dowry several lands in the Bresse region of France.

Boniface held several military positions for the Counts of Savoy, including those of marshal of Savoy from 1384 to 1418, governor of Piedmont (since 1410), as well as that of Savoyan ambassador to France and other countries. In 1407–1408, he perhaps visited the Saint Catherine's Monastery on Mount Sinai in Egypt.

He died at Pierre-Châtel in 1426. He was buried in the convent of St. Francis in Aosta. His tomb was later transferred in 1798 by Philippe-Maurice de Challant in the Aymavilles Castle, to avoid vandalisms by the French revolutionary army. It was eventually transferred in the Aosta Cathedral cloister in 1872.

== Sources ==
- Barbero, Alessandro (2000). Valle d'Aosta medievale. Naples: Liguori Editore. ISBN 88-207-3162-2.
