= Taillefer Massif =

Massif in the Western Alps

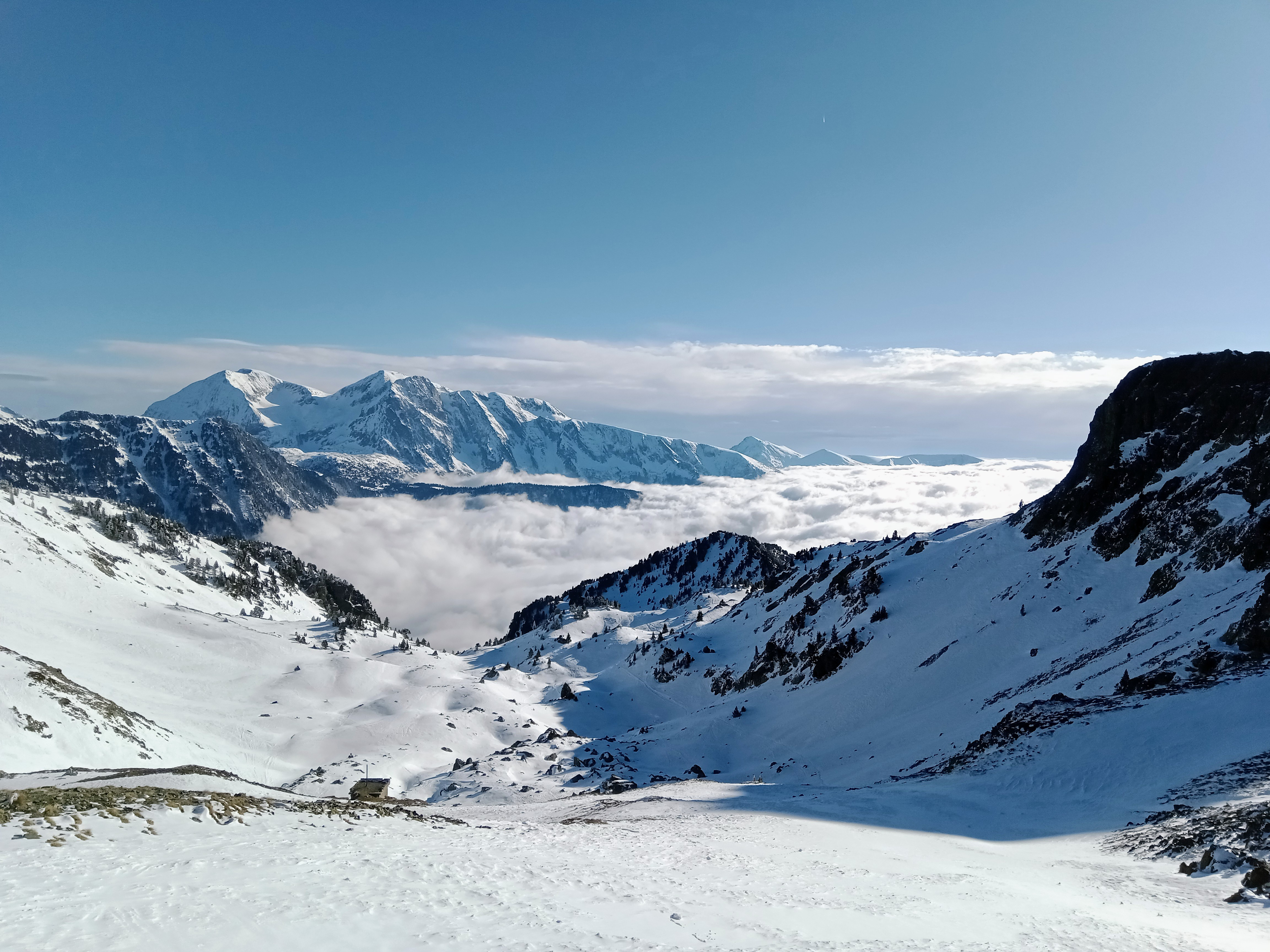

Highest point
- Elevation: 2,857 m (9,373 ft)
- Parent peak: Le Taillefer

Naming
- Native name: Massif du Taillefer (French)

Geography
- The massif is between the Vercors Massif and Massif des Écrins
- Country: France
- Department: Isère
- Region: Auvergne-Rhône-Alpes
- Parent range: Dauphiné Alps

The Taillefer Massif (French: Massif du Taillefer) is a massif in the French Alps located in the Isère department.

== Geography ==
=== Location ===
The massif extends southwest of the Belledonne range and is located northwest of the Écrins massif, north of the Dévoluy massif, and east of the Vercors. It is bordered by the Drac, Romanche, Lignarre, and Malsanne rivers. The plateau Matheysin, along with the surrounding peaks, occupies the western half. The northeastern part, known as Plateau des Lacs, is dotted with mountain lakes such as Veche, Agneau, Noir, Culasson, and Fourchu. The northeastern fringe, encompassing the Lignarre and Romanche watersheds, belongs to the Oisans region.

The massif is classified as a Natura 2000 site, featuring 19 habitats of community interest.

=== Main peaks ===
The massif consists of three parallel chains oriented north-south and arranged from east to west.

In the eastern chain (east of the Roizonne), which is the highest with ten peaks exceeding 2,500 meters, notable peaks include:

- Le Taillefer, the highest point, 2,857 m (9,373 ft)
- La Pyramide, 2,838 m (9,311 ft)
- Le Grand Armet, 2,792 m (9,160 ft)
- Pointe de l'Armet, 2,780 m (9,120 ft)
- Rocher du Lac, 2,776 m (9,108 ft)
- Les Mayes, 2,695 m (8,842 ft)
- Le Coiro, 2,607 m (8,553 ft)
- Le Grand Vent, 2,601 m (8,533 ft)
- Le Grand Galbert, 2,561 m (8,402 ft)
- Tête de la Grisonnière, 2,545 m (8,350 ft)
- Le Cornillon, 2,475 m (8,120 ft)
- La Cime Chalvine, 2,285 m (7,497 ft)
- Pointe de l'Aiguille, 2,283 m (7,490 ft)
- L'Étillier, 2,196 m (7,205 ft)
- Le Grand Serre, 2,141 m (7,024 ft)
- Le Pérollier, 2,183 m (7,162 ft)
- Le Grand Vent, 2,149 m (7,051 ft)
- L'Oreille du Loup, 2,291 m (7,516 ft)
- Le Tabor, the highest point of the central chain, 2,389 m (7,838 ft)

== Geology ==
The Taillefer Massif is predominantly a crystalline massif, similar to the Belledonne, to which it serves as an extension. In contrast, the western chain of Sénépy and the Conest mountain consists of slightly clayey limestones from the Lower Lias period. Additionally, the western flank features outcrops of calcschists from the Upper Lias period.
