= Et exspecto resurrectionem mortuorum =

1964 composition by Olivier Messiaen

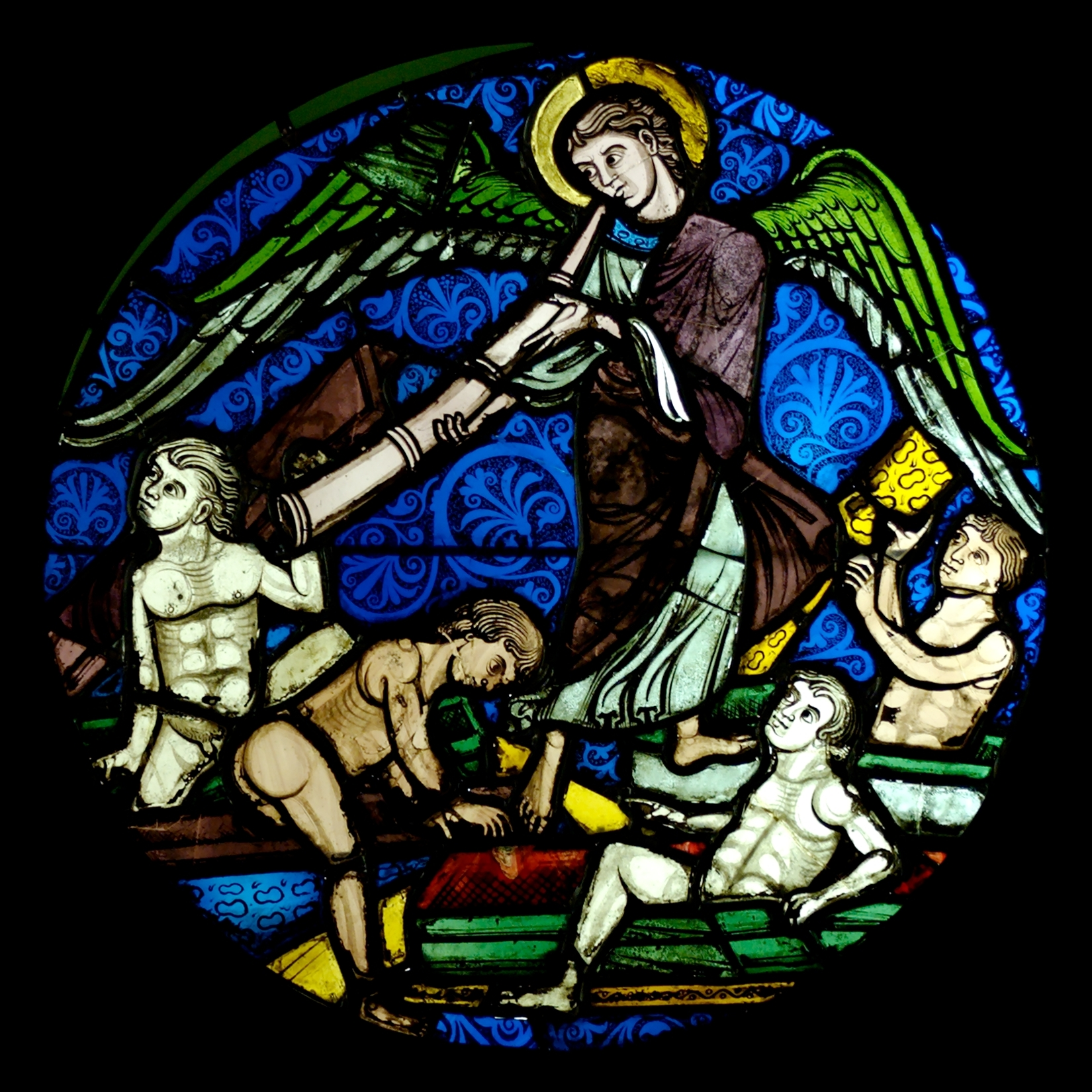
Résurrection des morts (Resurrection of the dead). Stained glass, around 1200, in the Sainte-Chapelle

Et exspecto resurrectionem mortuorum (And I await the resurrection of the dead) is a suite for wind orchestra and percussion instruments by Olivier Messiaen, written in 1964 and first performed the following year. It is composed of five movements.

The piece is dedicated to the dead of the first and second world wars.

== History ==
Messiaen was approached in October 1963 by André Malraux, Minister of Cultural Affairs under Charles de Gaulle, with a commission for a sacred work to commemorate the dead of the two World Wars. Originally envisioned as a work for chorus, large orchestra and brass, to be performed in June 1964 at the Sainte-Chapelle in Paris and at Notre-Dame de Chartres, the concept of the work and projected date of performance changed several times over the following year. Composition began in early July 1964, while Messiaen was vacationing at the Lac de Pétichet in the Hautes-Alpes, and the orchestration was completed early in January 1965 (Hill and Simeone 2005, 257–60). The title is taken from the penultimate line of the Nicene Creed: "Et exspecto resurrectionem mortuorum, et vitam venturi sæculi" (And I await the resurrection of the dead, and the life of the coming age).

It was premiered in the Sainte-Chapelle at 11:00 in the morning on 7 May 1965 (Cheong 2004, 115), and was performed for the second time in the morning of 20 June of the same year following a Solemn Mass at Chartres Cathedral and in the presence of President Charles de Gaulle, who warmly congratulated the composer after the performance (Hill and Simeone 2005, 263). Both performances were conducted by Serge Baudo, and the general rehearsal in Chartres on 19 June was filmed for television, later broadcast in the series Les grandes répétitions (Simeone 2010, 195).

In his prefaces to the second and third movements, Messiaen also paraphrases passages from "The Resurrection," from the supplement to the third part of the Summa Theologica by Thomas Aquinas (Bruhn 2008, 20–21).

== Instrumentation ==
The piece is scored for woodwind, brass and percussion.

Woodwinds

2 piccolos
3 flutes
3 oboes
cor anglais
clarinet in E♭
3 clarinets
bass clarinet
3 bassoons
contrabassoon

Brass

6 horns
trumpet in D
3 trumpets in C
3 trombones
bass trombone
tuba
bass saxhorn in B♭

Percussion

3 sets of cowbells (C_{5}–D_{7}, C_{4}–C_{5} and F_{3}–B_{3})
tubular bells
6 gongs
3 tam-tams

== Movements ==
The piece has five movements, lasting approximately 35 minutes in total:

1. "Des profondeurs de l'abîme, je crie vers toi, Seigneur: Seigneur, écoute ma voix!"
2. "Le Christ, ressuscité des morts, ne meurt plus; la mort n'a plus sur lui d'empire."
3. "L'heure vient où les morts entendront la voix du Fils de Dieu..."
4. "Ils ressusciteront, glorieux, avec un nom nouveau -- dans le concert joyeux des étoiles et les acclamations des fils du ciel."
5. "Et j'entendis la voix d'une foule immense..."

== Discography (selected) ==
Yvonne Loriod, piano (in Couleurs de la cité céleste); Groupe instrumental à percussion de Strasbourg, Orchestre du Domaine Musical, conductor: Pierre Boulez. Erato 2292-45505-2/III ECD 71587, 1966-71. Originally issued on LP, 1967.
