= Aymon of Challant =

Nobleman of the Challant family

Aymon II of Challant (French: Aymon de Challant, Italian: Aimone di Challant; c. 1305 – c. 1387) was a nobleman of the Challant family of Aosta Valley.

== Biography ==
He was the son of Godefroi II di Challant, the first son of Ebal I of Challant, and of the Genoese noblewoman Beatrice Fieschi; he was the brother of Ebal II of Challant.

In 1337 he inherited from his grandfather Ebal the fief of Fénis, after a series of disputes with his brother Ebal (who acquired Ussel Castle and Saint-Marcel) and his four uncles. Around 1340 he started the enlargement of the Fénis Castle, adding the central pentagonal body which is still visible. A second rework campaign took place later during his lordship. Aymon held several military and diplomatic positions for the Duchy of Savoy, such as a castellan of Lanzo, Moriana, Avigliana, Chambéry, Tarentaise, Susa, Montmélian, Ivrea, Bard, Sallanches and Castruzzone, governor of Ivrea and bailiff of Val di Susa and Savoy.

Between 1354 and 1357 he received from Amadeus VI of Savoy the fief of Aymavilles and restored its castle. He died around 1387. Fénis and its castle were assigned to his son Boniface. His second son Amadeus received Aymavilles, starting the cadet line of the Challant-Aymavilles.

== Sources ==
- Barbero, Alessandro (2000). Valle d'Aosta medievale. Naples: Liguori Editore. ISBN 88-207-3162-2.
