= Ebal I of Challant =

Ebal I of Challant (French: Ébal I^{er} de Challant or Ébal le Grand, Italian: Ebalo I di Challant or Ebalo Magno; died 1323) was a nobleman of the Challant family of Aosta Valley.

== Biography ==
He was the son of Godefroi I of Challant, viscount of Aosta, and Beatrice of Geneva. He inherited from his paternal uncle the titles of Aosta and the fiefs of Challant, Graines, Ussel, Fénis and Saint-Marcel. Ebal married Alasia of Montjovet, from whom he obtained part of Montjovet.

In 1295 he renounced to the title of viscount of Aosta, which thus returned to the counts of Savoy, receiving in exchange the remaining lands of Montjovet. During his c. 50 years of countship, he was a faithful ally of Amadeus V of Savoy, but kept good relationships with the latter's main enemies, the Marquisses of Montferrat. In 1280 he intervened with Amadeus to obtain the releasing of William VII of Montferrat. In 1297 he was appointed as general lieutenant of Montferrat by Marquis John I.

His death in 1323 at Challant was followed by a dispute among his heirs. This lasted until 1337, when his sons agreed to give Fénis to Ebal's grandson Aymon and Ussel and Saint-Marcel to Ebal II of Challant.

== Sources ==
- Barbero, Alessandro (2000). Valle d'Aosta medievale. Naples: Liguori Editore. ISBN 88-207-3162-2.
