= Sénépy =

- Sénépy mountain viewed from Sommet du Serre de l'Horizon, minor neighbour summit

Highest point
- Elevation: 1,769 m (5,804 ft)
- Prominence: 833 m (2,733 ft)
- Coordinates: 44°54′29″N 5°43′17″E

Geography
- Location within France
- Location: Isère, France
- Parent range: Matheysine

Climbing
- Easiest route: footpath

Sénépy is a mountain located in Matheysine, in the Dauphiné Alps of south-eastern France.

Its elevation is 1,769m. It overlooks the Drac river valley, the Monteynard lake, as well as the Trièves plateau on the opposite riverbank.

It is mainly covered by high mountain pastures. Due to high exposure to strong winds (bise) from the North, a project consisting of implementing Wind power plants on the mountain is being studied. This project is facing strong opposition from environmental concerns.
