= Pierre Percée =

Coordinates: 44°57′54″N 5°45′33″E

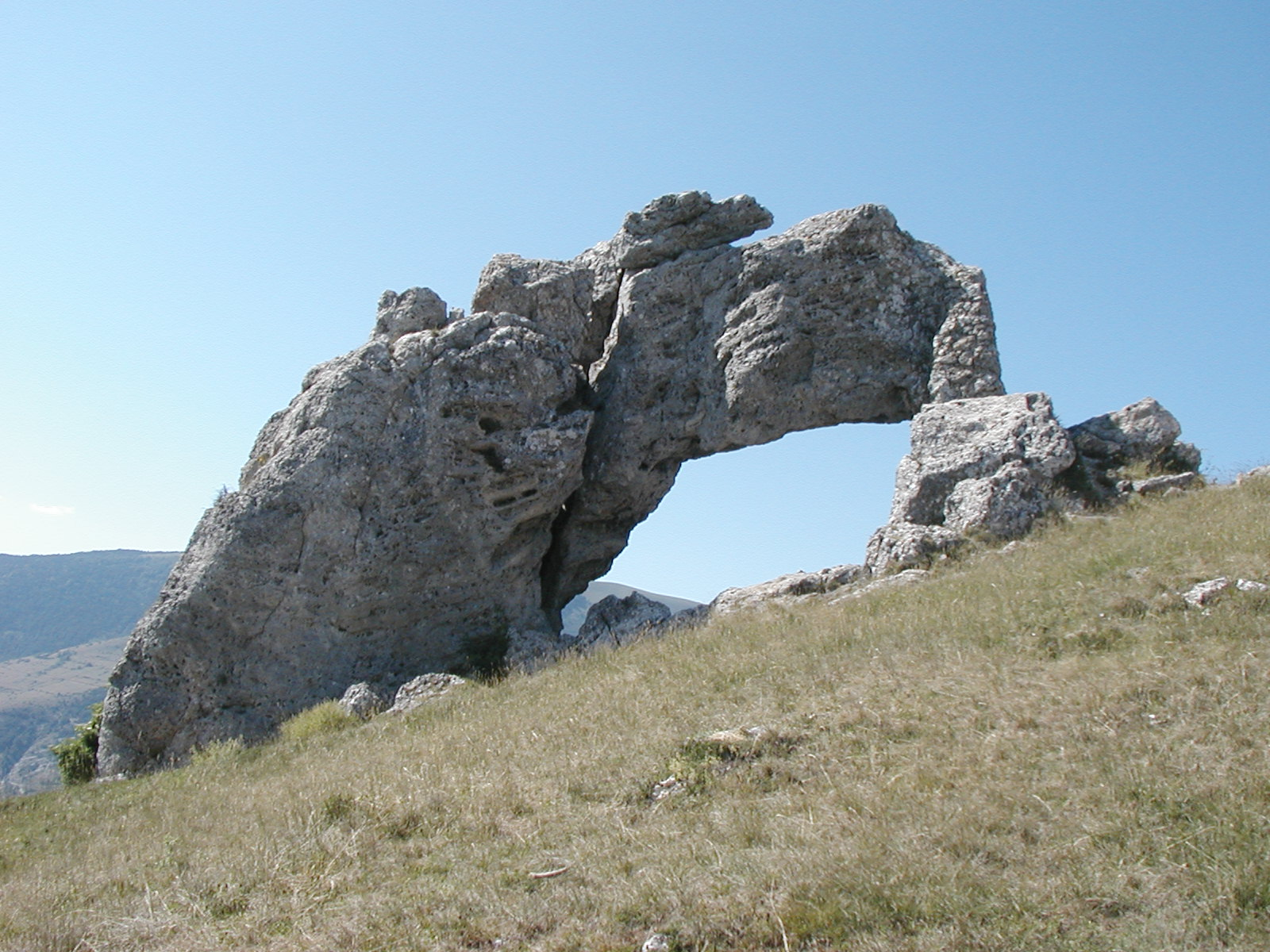
The Pierre Percée

The Pierre Percée (French pronunciation: [pjɛʁ pɛʁse]) is a natural arch located on a hill of Matheysine, in the Isère département, upon the commune of Pierre-Châtel. It belongs to the Seven Wonders of Dauphiné.

Internal gap is 3m. high.

Overall aspect evokes the one of a crouching monster and has been the origin of many local legends, where the Devil is usually involved.

== See also ==
- Dauphiné Alps
