= Chichilianne =

- Commune
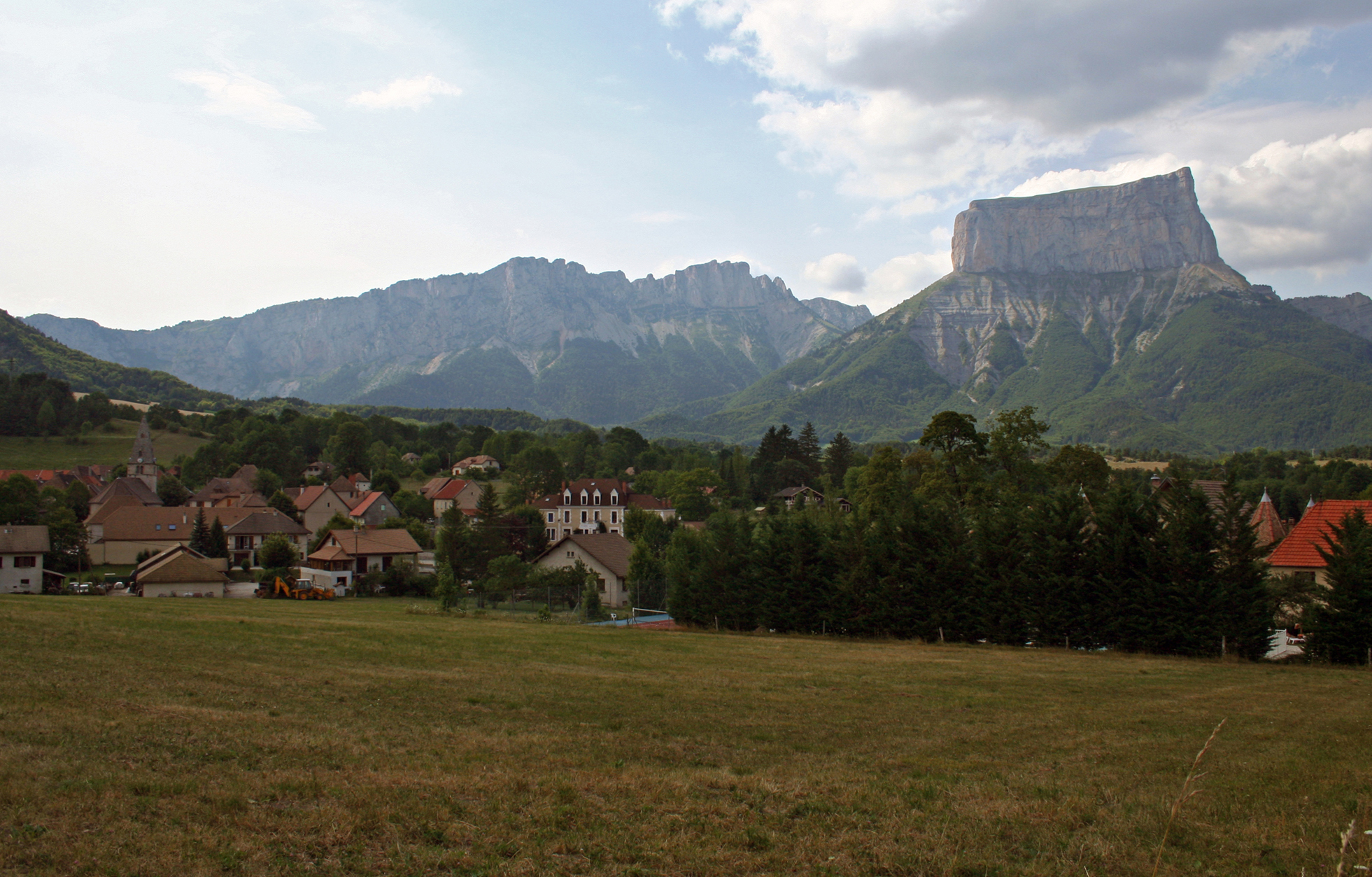
- Chichilianne, with Mont Aiguille in the background
- Location of Chichilianne
- Location within France Location within Auvergne-Rhône-Alpes
- Coordinates: 44°48′44″N 5°34′23″E
- Country: France
- Region: Auvergne-Rhône-Alpes
- Department: Isère
- Arrondissement: Grenoble
- Canton: Matheysine-Trièves

Government
  - Mayor (2020–2026): Éric Vallier
- Area^{1}: 62 km^{2} (24 sq mi)
- Elevation: 1,000 m (3,300 ft)
- Highest elevation: 2,082 m (6,831 ft)
- Lowest elevation: 798 m (2,618 ft)
- Population (2023): 336
  - Density: 5.4/km^{2} (14/sq mi)
- Time zone: UTC+01:00 (CET)
  - Summer (DST): UTC+02:00 (CEST)
- INSEE/Postal code: 38103 /38930
- ^{1} French Land Register data, which excludes lakes, ponds, glaciers > 1 km^{2} (0.386 sq mi or 247 acres) and river estuaries.

Chichilianne (French pronunciation: [ʃiʃiljan]) is a commune in the Isère department in southeastern France.

== Population ==
Historical population
Year	Pop.	±% p.a.
1968	170	—
1975	130	−3.76%
1982	159	+2.92%
1990	158	−0.08%
1999	207	+3.05%
2007	271	+3.42%
2012	279	+0.58%
2017	305	+1.80%
2023	336	+1.63%
Source: INSEE

== See also ==
- Communes of the Isère department
- Parc naturel régional du Vercors
