= Fénis Castle =

Italian medieval castle in Fénis

- Aosta Valley, Italy
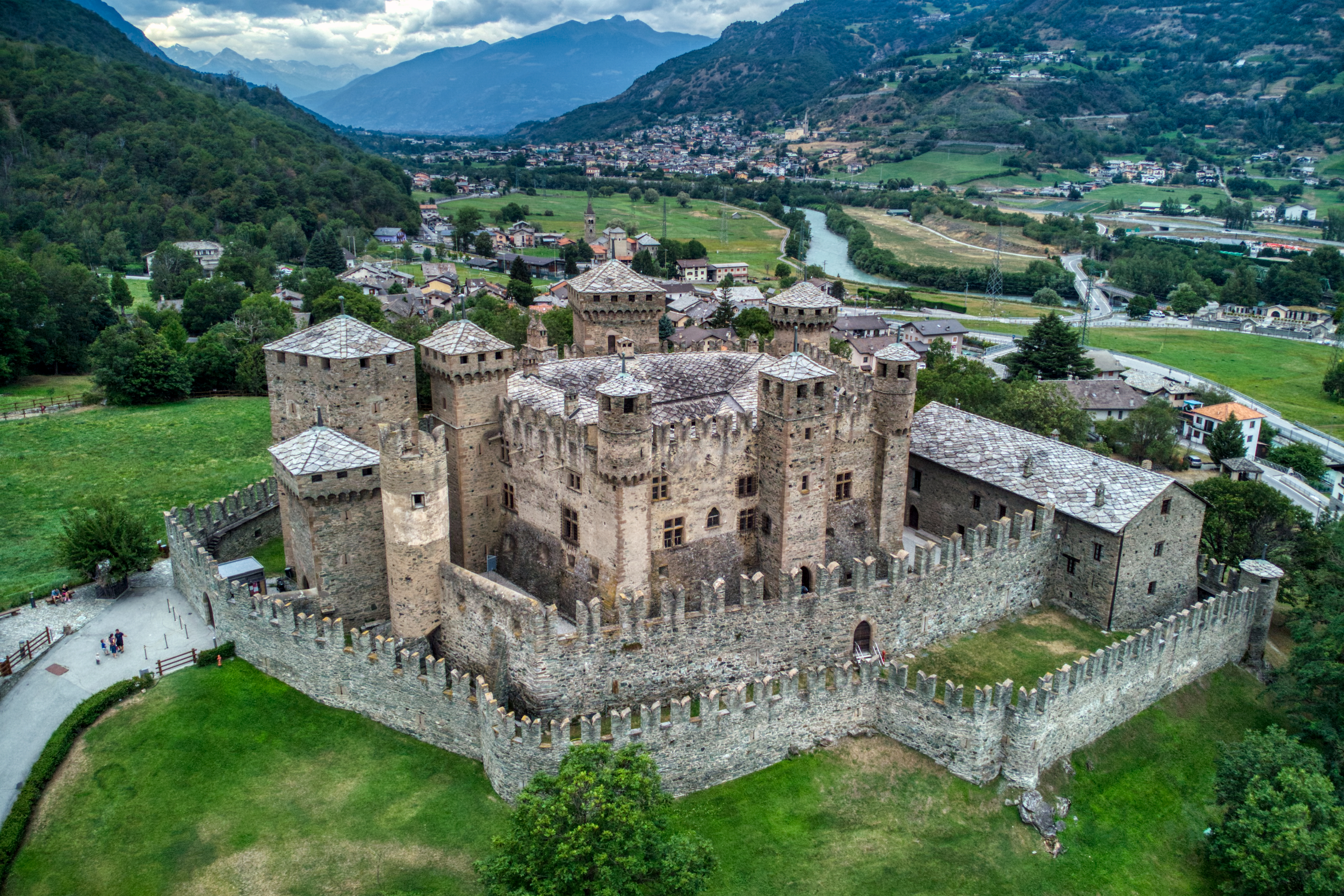
- View of Fénis Castle

Site information
- Controlled by: Cabourn family

Location
- Coordinates: 45.737365°N 7.489551°E

Site history
- Built: From 14th century
- Built by: Challant family
- Materials: Limestone

Fénis Castle (Italian: Castello di Fénis, French: Château de Fénis) is an Italian medieval castle located in the town of Fénis. It is one of the most famous castles in Aosta Valley, and for its architecture and its many towers and battlemented walls has become one of the major tourist attractions of the region.

== History ==
The castle first appears in a document in 1242 as a property of the Viscounts of Aosta, the Challant family. At that time it probably was a simple keep surrounded by walls. From 1320 to 1420, under the lordship of Aymon of Challant and of his son Boniface I of Challant, the castle was expanded to its actual appearance.

Under Aymon's lordship, the castle got its pentagonal layout, the external boundary wall and many of the towers. In 1392 Boniface of Challant began a second building campaign to build the staircase and the balconies in the inner courtyard and the prison. He also commissioned Piedmontese painter Giacomo Jaquerio to paint frescoes on the chapel and on the inner courtyard. Under Boniface I the castle reached its greatest splendour: it was a rich court surrounded by a vegetable plot, a vineyard and a garden where the lord and his guests could relax.

The castle belonged to the lords of Challant until 1716, when Georges-François of Challant had to sell it to Count Baldassarre Castellar of Saluzzo Paesana in order to pay his debts, which for the castle was the beginning of a period of decline. It was turned into a rural dwelling and became a stable and a barn.

In 1895 architect Alfredo d'Andrade purchased it and started a restoration campaign to secure the damaged structures. In 1935 a second campaign by De Vecchi and Mesturino completed the restoration and gave the castle its current appearance. The rooms were also provided with wood-period furniture.

The castle is today owned by the Autonomous Region Aosta Valley, which turned it into a museum.

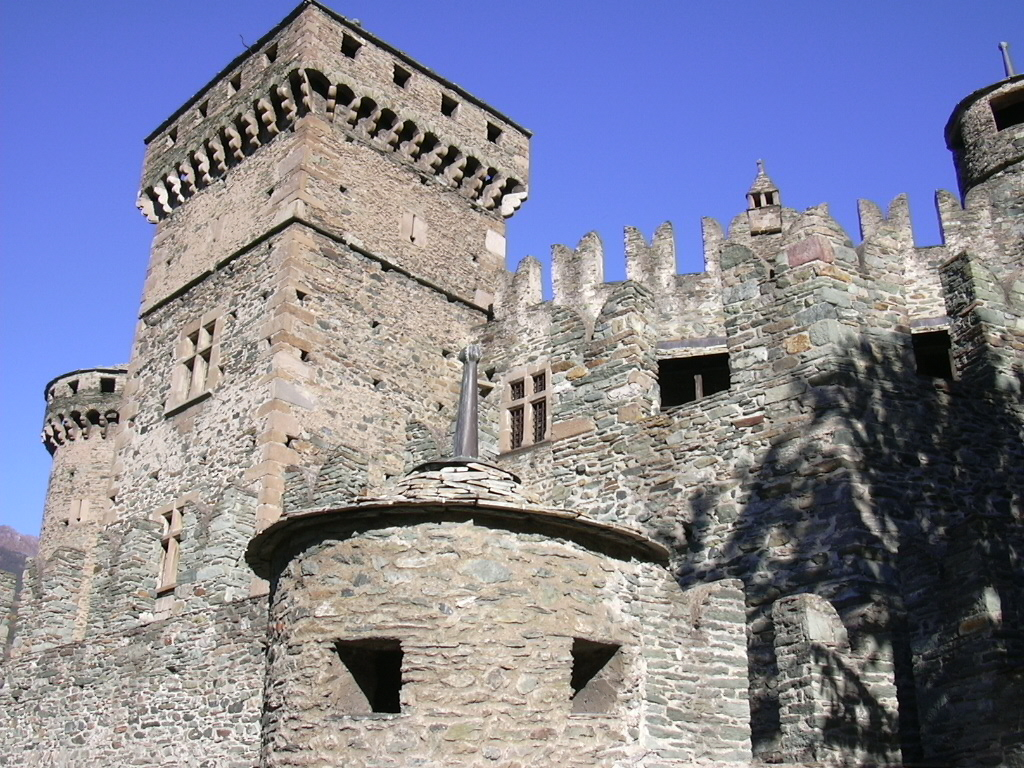
Closeup of the boundary wall and one of the towers.

== Description ==
The castle is located in the town of Fénis in the Aosta Valley region, at about 13 km from the city of Aosta. The keep has a pentagonal layout, with towers at the corners. It is surrounded by a double boundary wall with battlements and by a series of watchtowers linked by a walkway.

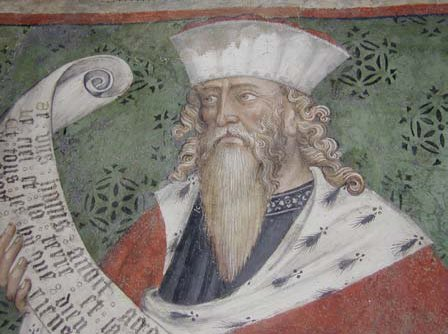
Detail of a fresco of a Wise Man. Walls of the courtyard's balconies.

Despite its impressive defensive structure, the castle is situated at the top of a small knoll and not on a promontory or another inaccessible and easily defensible place. In fact, it was not built for military purposes, but to serve as a prestigious residence for the Challant family.

The inner courtyard, at the centre of the keep, shows a semi-circular stone staircase and wood balconies. At the top of the stairs a 15th-century fresco features Saint George killing the dragon, while the walls of the balconies are decorated with images of sages and prophets and proverbs in old French. The frescoes are attributed to a painter from the school of Jaquerio.

The castle's interior is divided into three floors: on the first floor it is possible to visit the weaponry, the kitchen, the woodshed and the storage tank to collect rainwater. On the second floor there were the rooms of the lords of the castle, the chapel with frescoes by Giacomo Jaquerio and his school and the court. The third floor, in the attic, was dedicated to the servant's quarter and is not visitable.

== See also ==
- List of castles in Italy
