= Pierre-Châtel =

- Commune
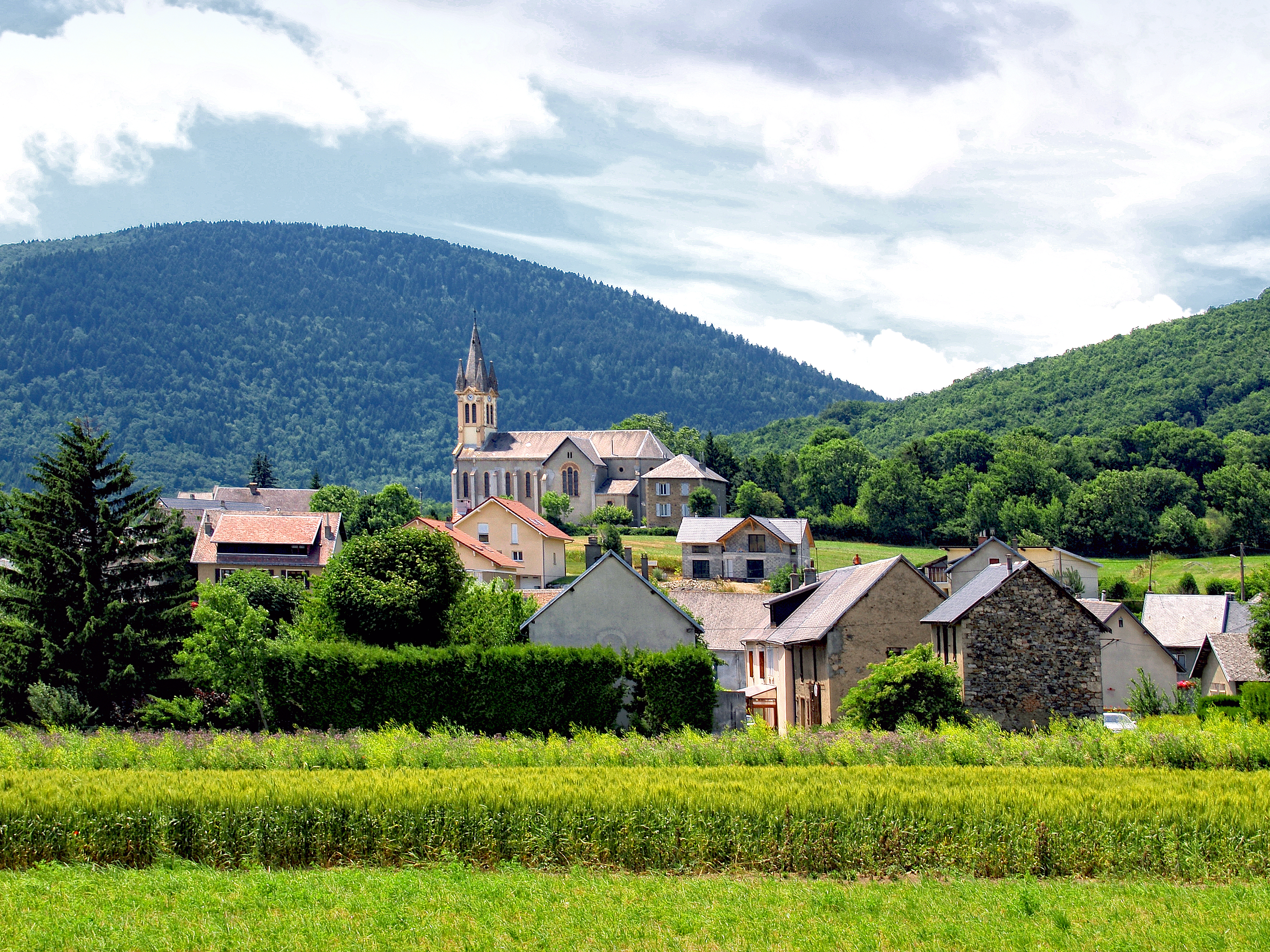
- A general view of Pierre-Châtel

- Coat of arms
- Location of Pierre-Châtel
- Location within France Location within Auvergne-Rhône-Alpes
- Coordinates: 44°57′28″N 5°46′35″E
- Country: France
- Region: Auvergne-Rhône-Alpes
- Department: Isère
- Arrondissement: Grenoble
- Canton: Matheysine-Trièves
- Intercommunality: La Matheysine

Government
  - Mayor (2020–2026): Alain Villard
- Area^{1}: 11 km^{2} (4.2 sq mi)
- Elevation: 916 m (3,005 ft)
- Highest elevation: 1,424 m (4,672 ft)
- Lowest elevation: 888 m (2,913 ft)
- Population (2023): 1,475
  - Density: 130/km^{2} (350/sq mi)
- Time zone: UTC+01:00 (CET)
  - Summer (DST): UTC+02:00 (CEST)
- INSEE/Postal code: 38304 /38119
- ^{1} French Land Register data, which excludes lakes, ponds, glaciers > 1 km^{2} (0.386 sq mi or 247 acres) and river estuaries.

Pierre-Châtel (French pronunciation: [pjɛʁ ʃatɛl]) is a commune in the Isère department in southeastern France.

== Geography ==
Lac de Pierre-Châtel and the Pierre Percée are located in the commune.

== Population ==
Historical population
Year	Pop.	±% p.a.
1968	1,527	—
1975	1,224	−3.11%
1982	1,218	−0.07%
1990	1,226	+0.08%
1999	1,202	−0.22%
2007	1,234	+0.33%
2012	1,463	+3.46%
2017	1,496	+0.45%
2023	1,475	−0.24%
Source: INSEE

== Personalities ==
Peter II of Savoy and Boniface I of Challant died in Pierre-Châtel, respectively in 1268 and 1426.

== See also ==
- Communes of the Isère department
