= Mont Aiguille =

Mountain in France

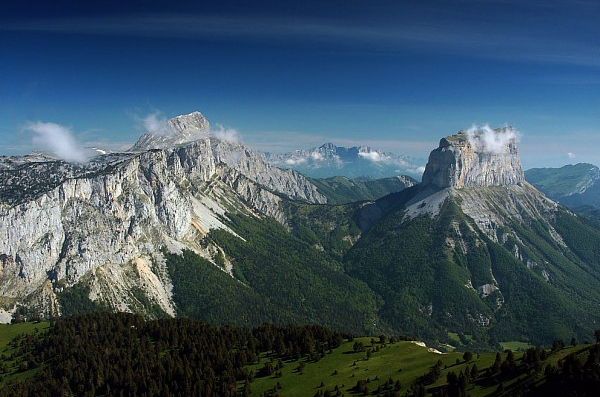
- Mont Aiguille (right)

Highest point
- Elevation: 2,087 m (6,847 ft)
- Prominence: 451 m (1,480 ft)
- Coordinates: 44°50′31″N 05°33′09″E

Geography
- Location within France Location within Alps
- Country: France
- Region: Auvergne-Rhône-Alpes
- Département: Isère
- Commune: Chichilianne
- Parent range: Vercors Massif

Climbing
- First ascent: 1492 by Antoine de Ville
- Easiest route: Basic rock climb

Mont Aiguille (Occitan: Mont Agulha) (2,087 m (6,847 ft)) is a mountain in the Vercors Massif of the French Prealps, located 58 km (36 mi) south of Grenoble, in the commune of Chichilianne, and the département of Isère. The mountain, known as one of the Seven Wonders of Dauphiné, is a relatively flat limestone mesa surrounded by steep cliffs. The mountain lies within an area designated in 1970 as the Vercors Regional Natural Park. Mont Aiguille's limestone cliffs, especially on the northwest side, are popular with climbers. Its first climb in 1492 was said to mark the birth of mountaineering.

== Topography and geography ==
Mont Aiguille is a mesa eroded from the Vercors Plateau in the drainage basin of the Rhône. It is surrounded by steep cliffs and has a height of 2,087 metres (6,847 ft) and a clean prominence of 465 m (1,526 ft). The surrounding terrain is difficult enough to warrant a technical climb as the easiest method of ascent. The mountain is capped with meadows botanically similar to those on the Vercors High Plateau, but beneath the cliffs there are extensive forests. The mountain lies within the Vercors Regional Natural Park and is in the département of Isère. The nearest access by rail is in the village of Saint-Martin-de-Clelles and by road is from the north via the Col de La Bâtie.

== Geomorphology and geology ==
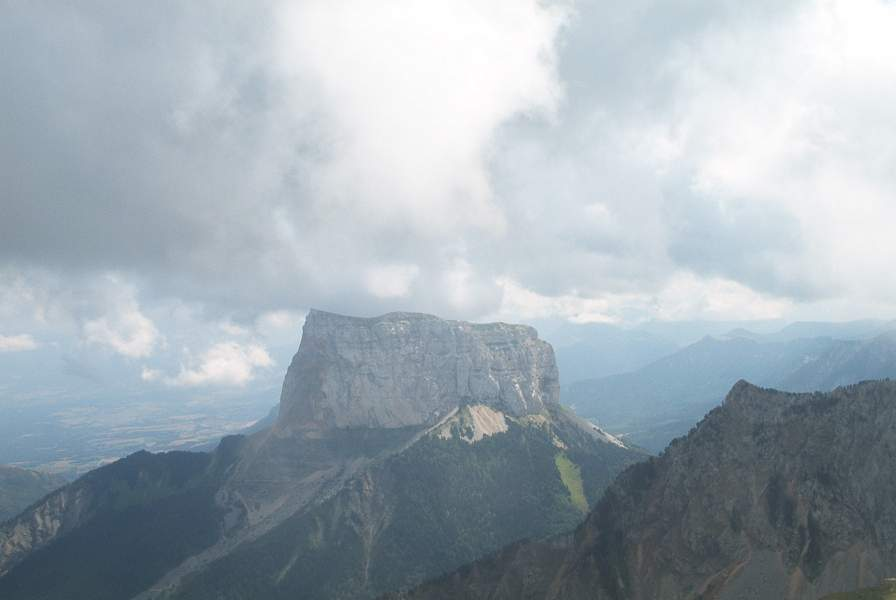
Mont Aiguille from le Grand Veymont

Geomorphologically, the mountain is a mesa-like outlier, that is to say, the remains of a plateau that has been otherwise eroded to leave only a single pillar of rock - weaker or fractured rocks (the so-called Jasneuf fault) between the current summit and the Vercors high plateau were eroded over time by over 400 metres, leaving the peak standing on its own. This has resulted in several unique features of Mont Aiguille, including the cliffs, which are almost identical to those on the eastern edge of the Vercors Plateau such as those on the edge of the Grand Veymont, which is the highest point of the range. Another feature resulting from this is the presence of meadows on the summit plateau, which are similar to those to the west on the rest of the Vercors plateau.

Mont Aiguille is a limestone mesa, previously connected to the main body of the high plateau of the Vercors Massif. The summit is made up of lower Barremian strata, deposited during the Cretaceous period. This is the same as the plateau to the west, but not as the immediate environs: the lower slopes are composed of older Hauterivian strata. As easily observed, the bedding planes are all roughly level, although there is some inclination down to the north-east.

== History ==
According to Roman legend, the mountain was torn from the rest of the Vercors when a hunter named Ibicus saw naked goddesses on the mountain and was changed into an ibex as punishment. In the medieval period, Mont Aiguille was traditionally called "Mount Inaccessible", and typically depicted as an "inverted pyramid" or "mushroom". Since at least the thirteenth century, the mountain has been regarded as one of the Seven Wonders of Dauphiné. The mountain is most noted for its first ascent in 1492. Charles VIII ordered that the peak be climbed, so one of his servants, Antoine de Ville, made the ascent using a combination of ladders, ropes and other artificial aids. He was visited in the following days by many local members of the nobility and aristocracy. The team bivouacked on the summit for eight days, erecting small crosses and a stone shelter. The ascent is described by François Rabelais in his Quart Livre. This was the first recorded climb of any technical difficulty, and has been said to mark the beginning of mountaineering.

The mountain was not climbed again until 1834, nearly 350 years later, when it was ascended barefoot by Jean Liotard, accompanied for one-quarter of the way by local explorers. Less than a month later, it was climbed by seven people at the same time, who reportedly danced and sang La Marseillaise on the summit. In 1940, the top 11 m (36 ft) of the mountain collapsed, reducing the height to 2,085 m (6,841 ft). Seventeen years later, on 27 August 1957, the stunt pilot Henri Giraud landed a Piper J-3 Cub on the summit, utilising an 80 m (260 ft)-long, 20 m (66 ft)-wide runway which had been built earlier that day using materials and men lifted to the summit by helicopters. In the following 18 years, he staged a further 51 landings on the summit before his final landing in 1975, many carrying paying passengers, and often made using skis. The mountain was designated in 1970 as part of the Vercors Regional Natural Park.

== Gallery ==
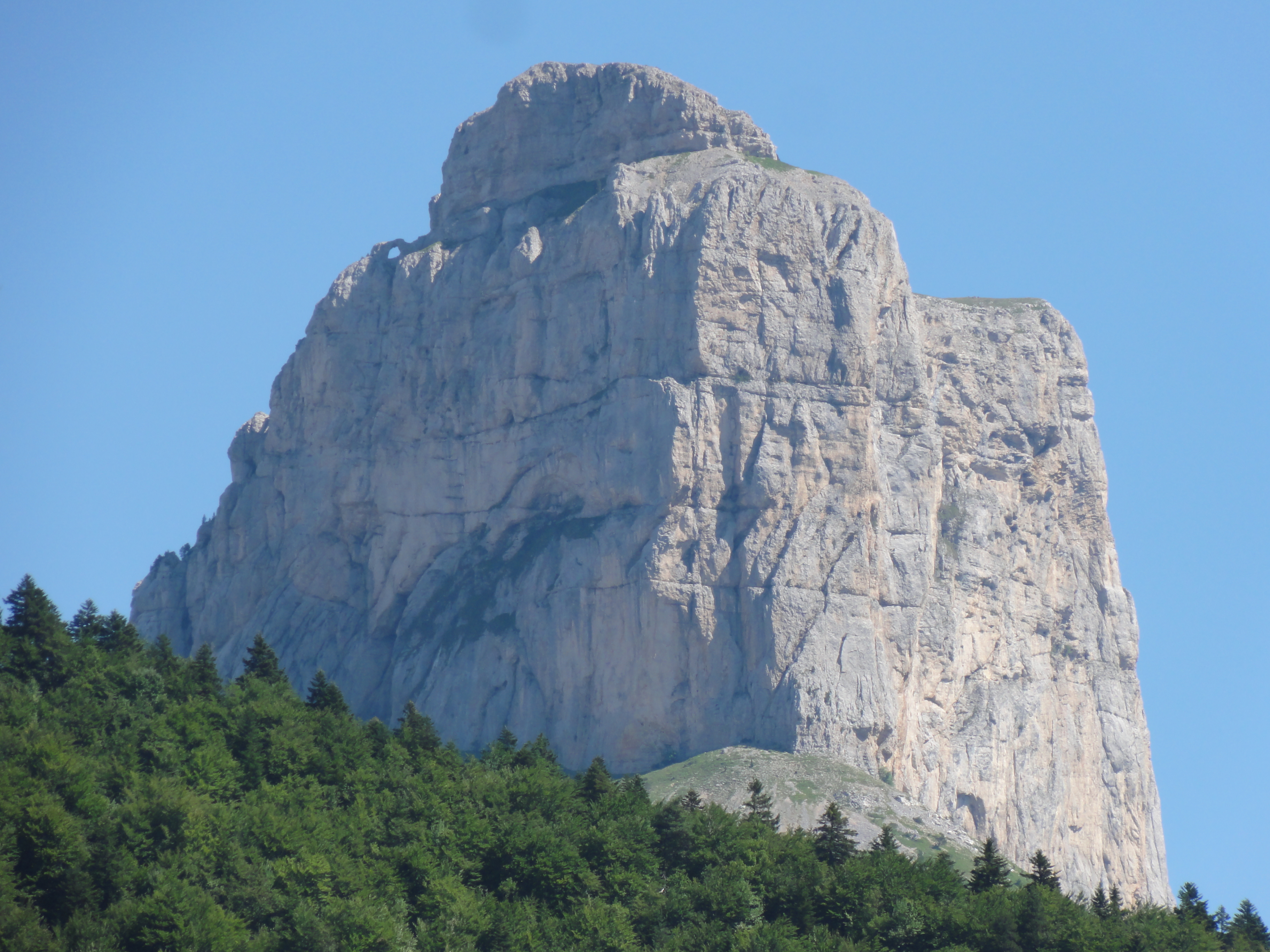
Mont Aiguille with the arch from Little Needle

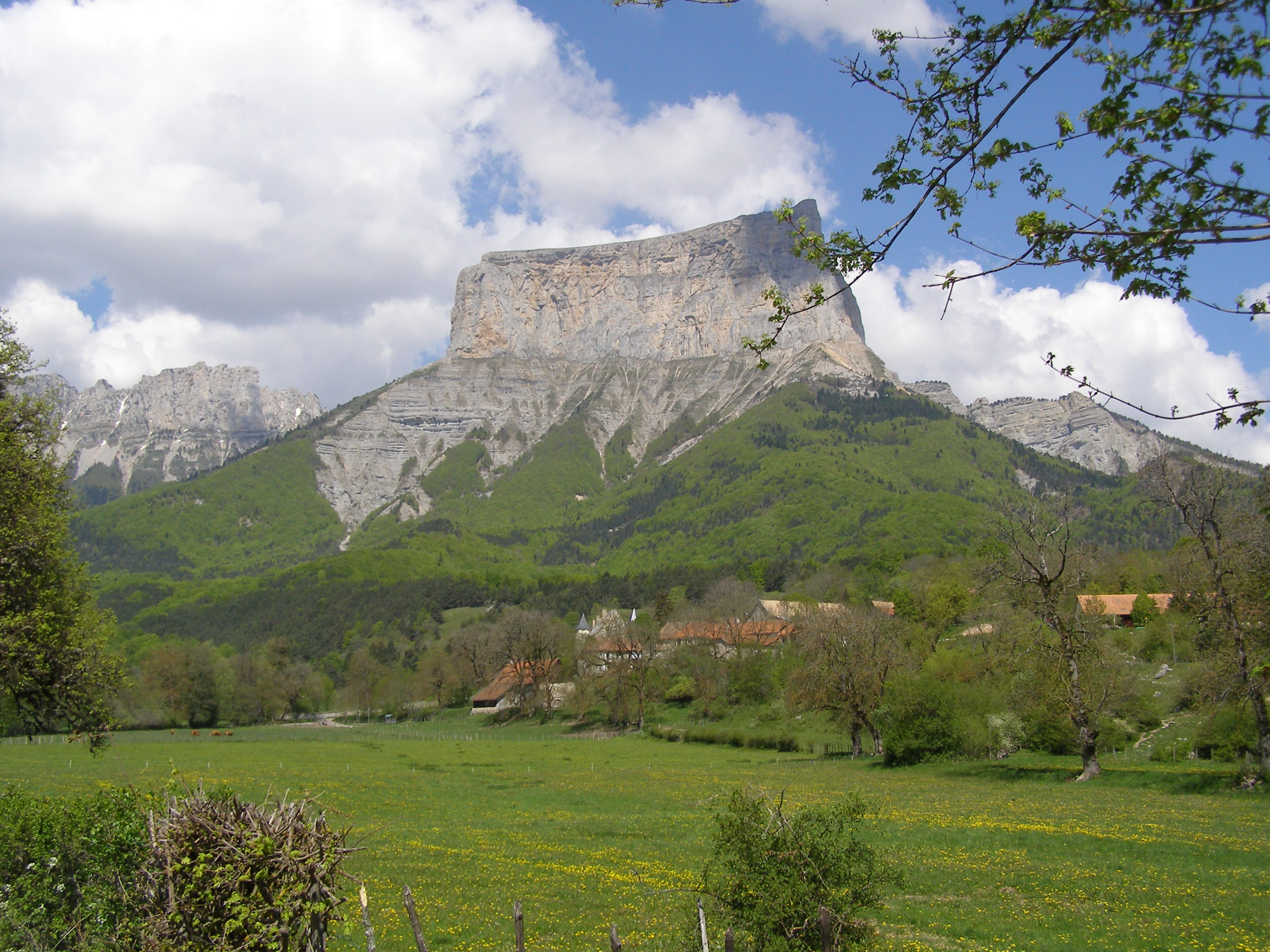
Mont Aiguille

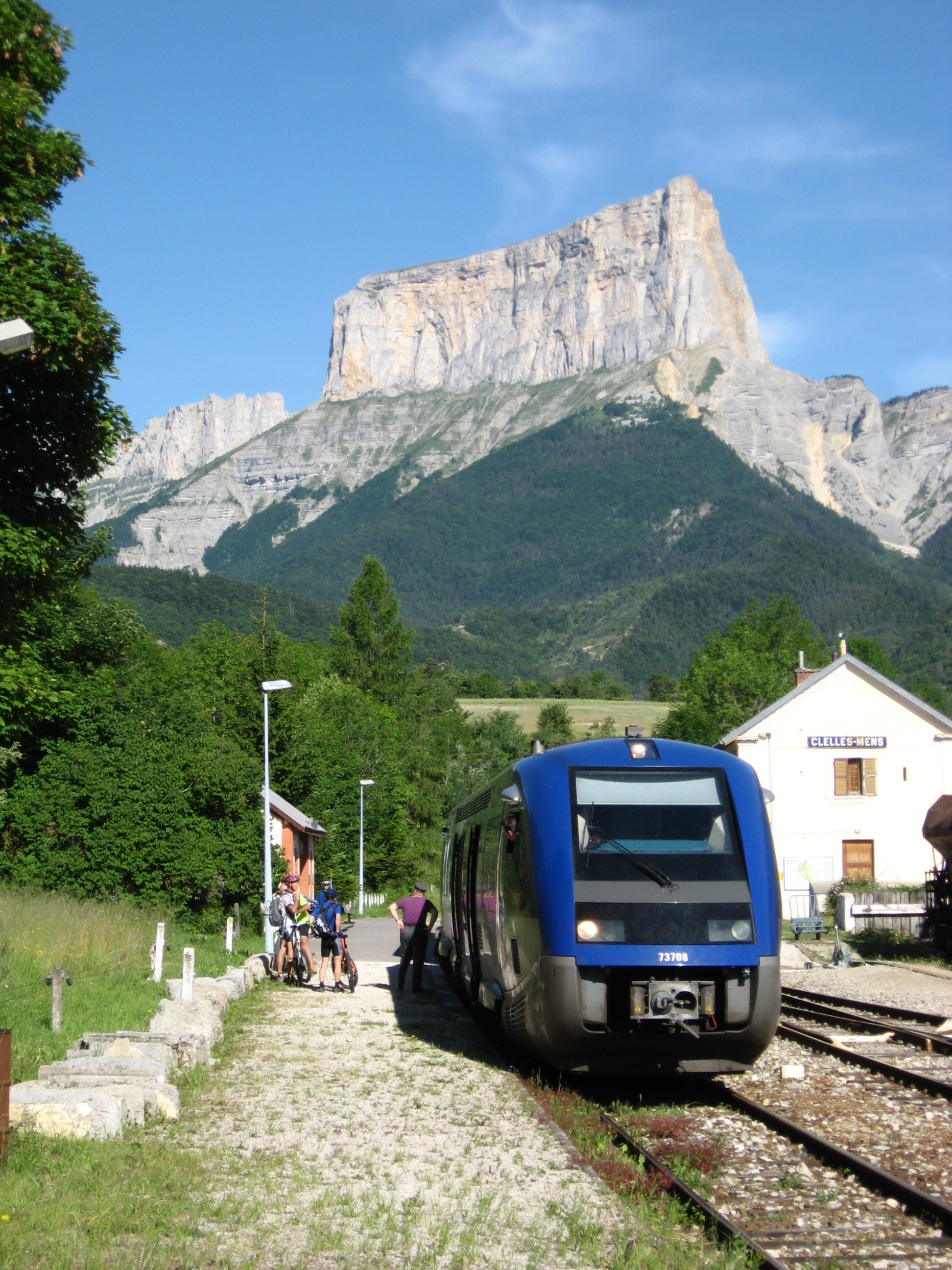
Clelles-Mens station

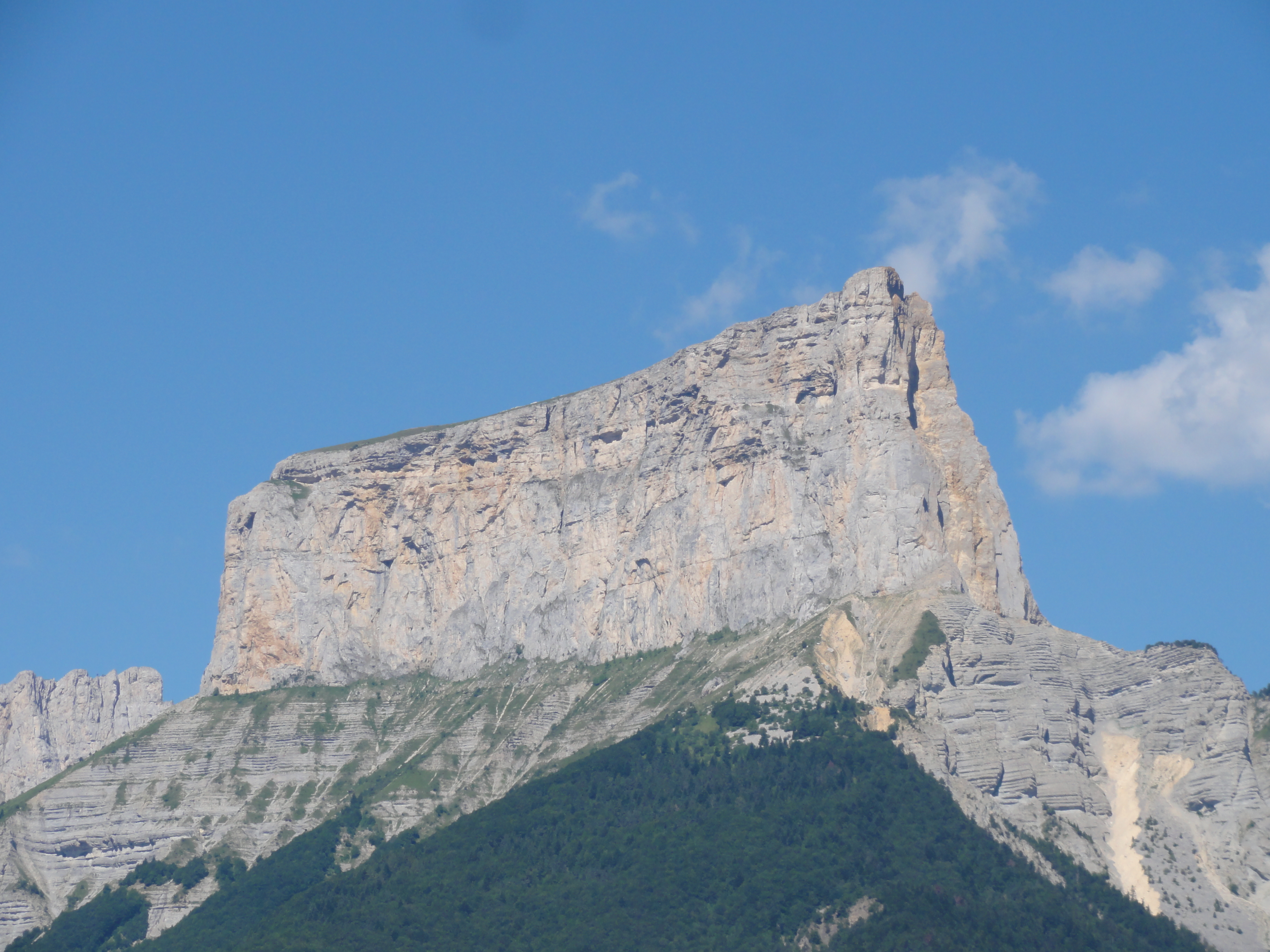
Mont Aiguille viewed from RN Clelles

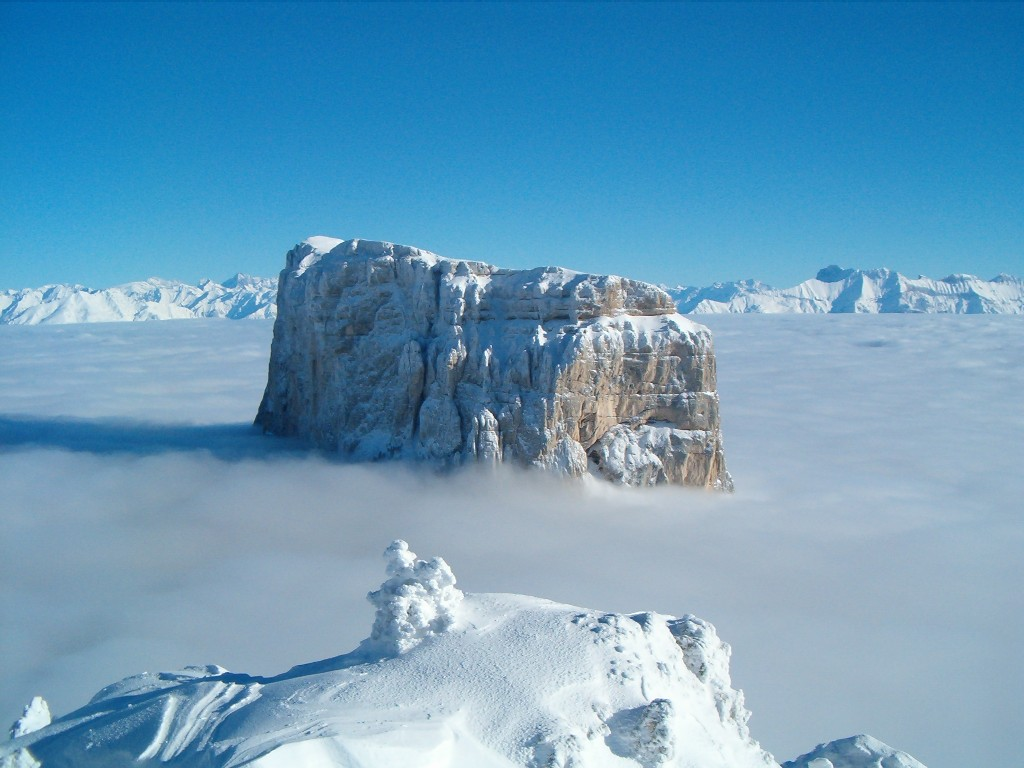
Mont Aiguille
