= Seven Wonders of Dauphiné =

The Seven Wonders of Dauphiné (Occitan: Sete Meravilhas de Dupaunet) are seven natural and man-made sites and monuments located in the Dauphiné former province of south-eastern France, and especially within the Dauphiné Alps, each with some attached legendary or mythical significance.

These comprise Mont Aiguille, the Fontaine Ardente, the Grottes de Sassenage, Tour sans venin, Pont de Claix, Grottes de la Balme, and Pierre Percée sites.

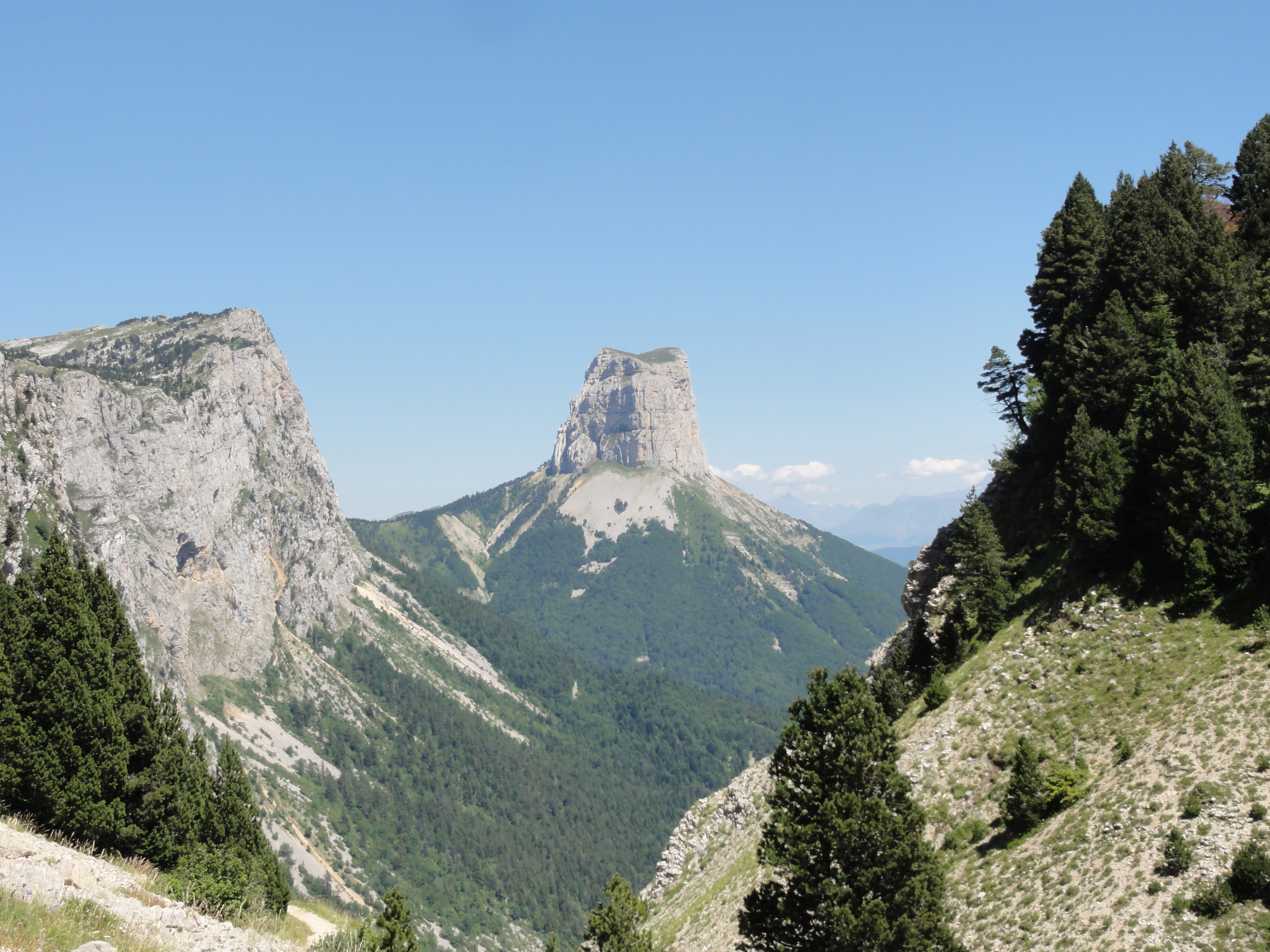
Mont Aiguille.

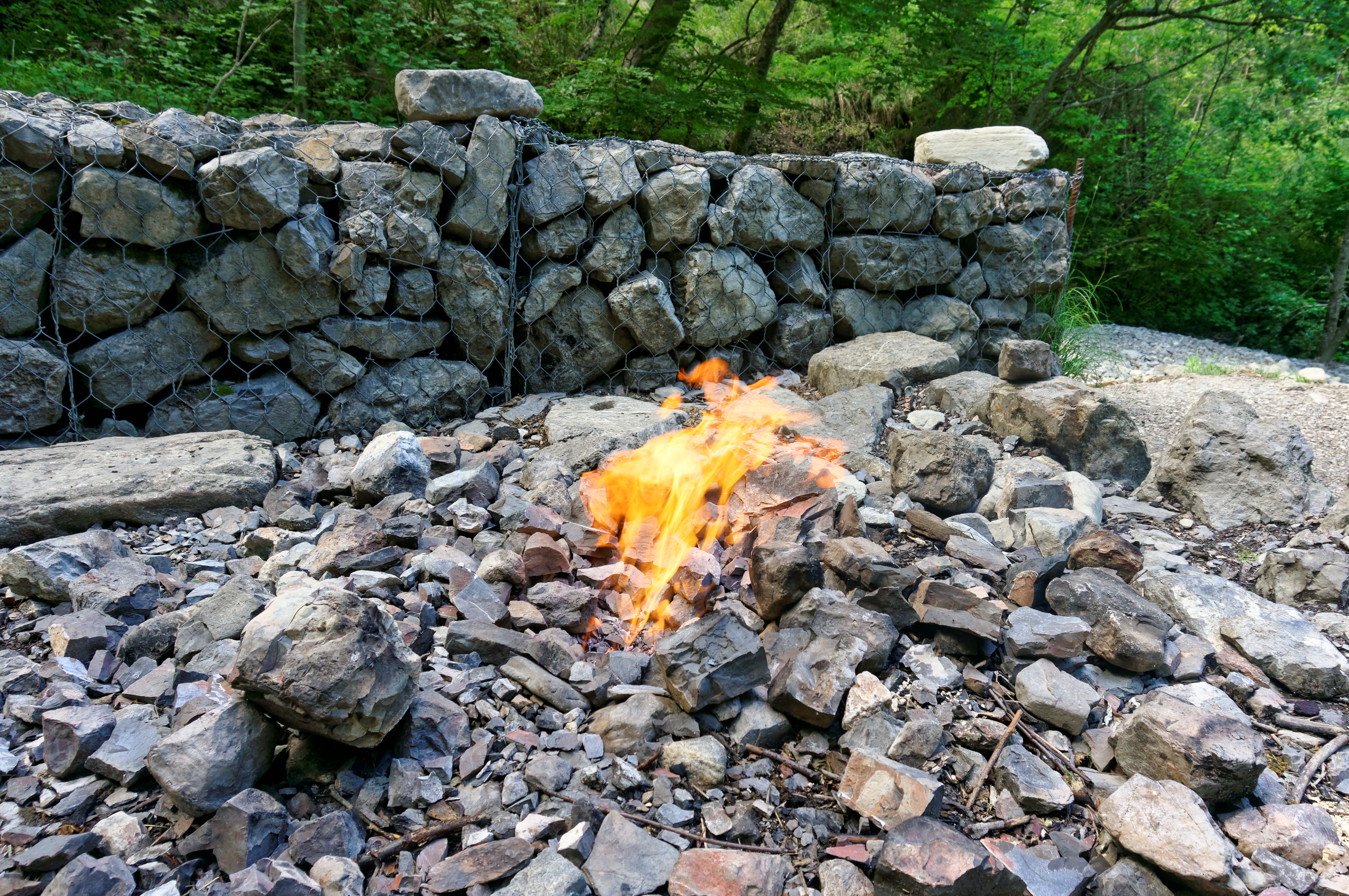
Fontaine Ardente.

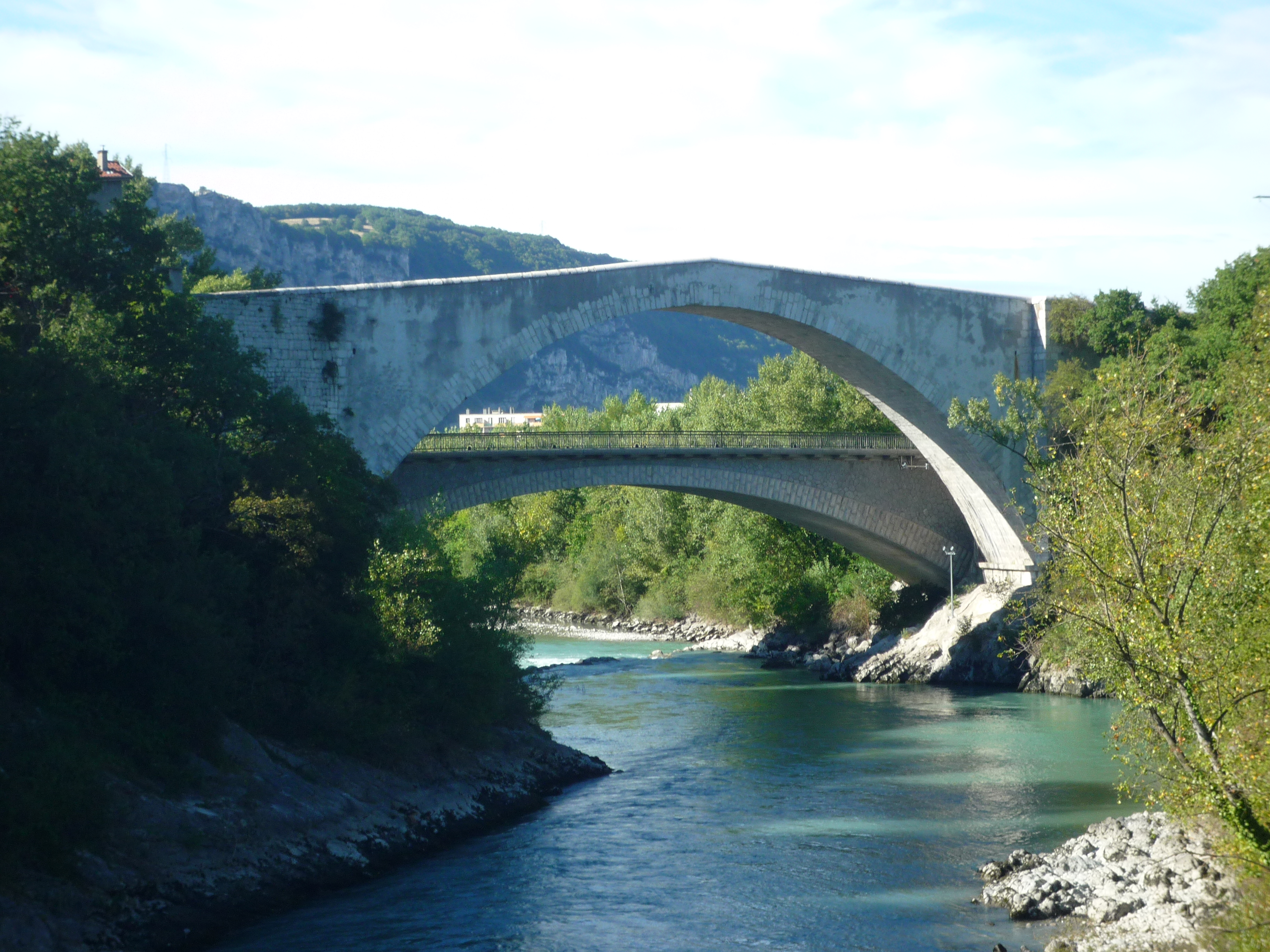
Lesdiguières Bridge.

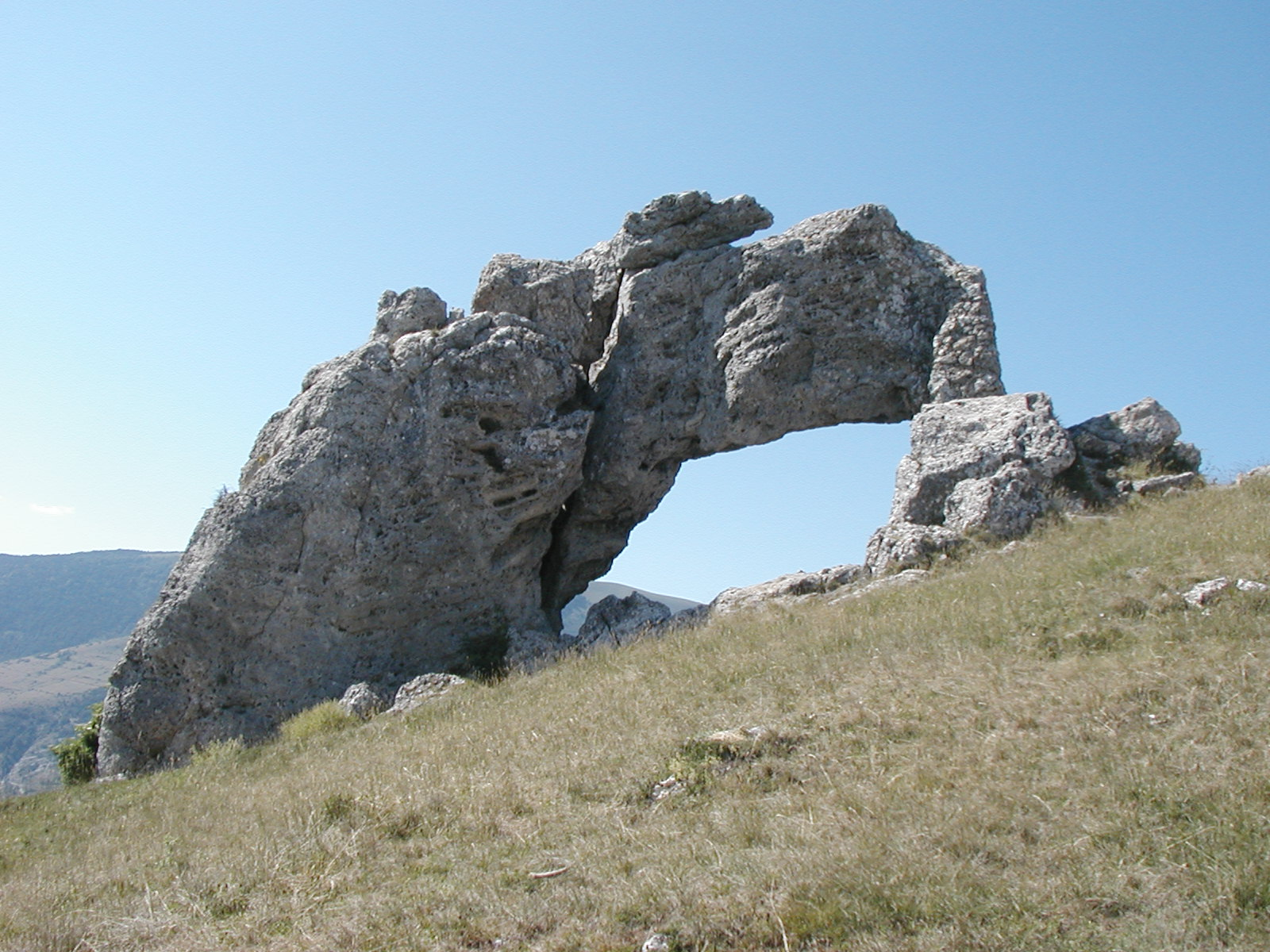
Pierre Percée.

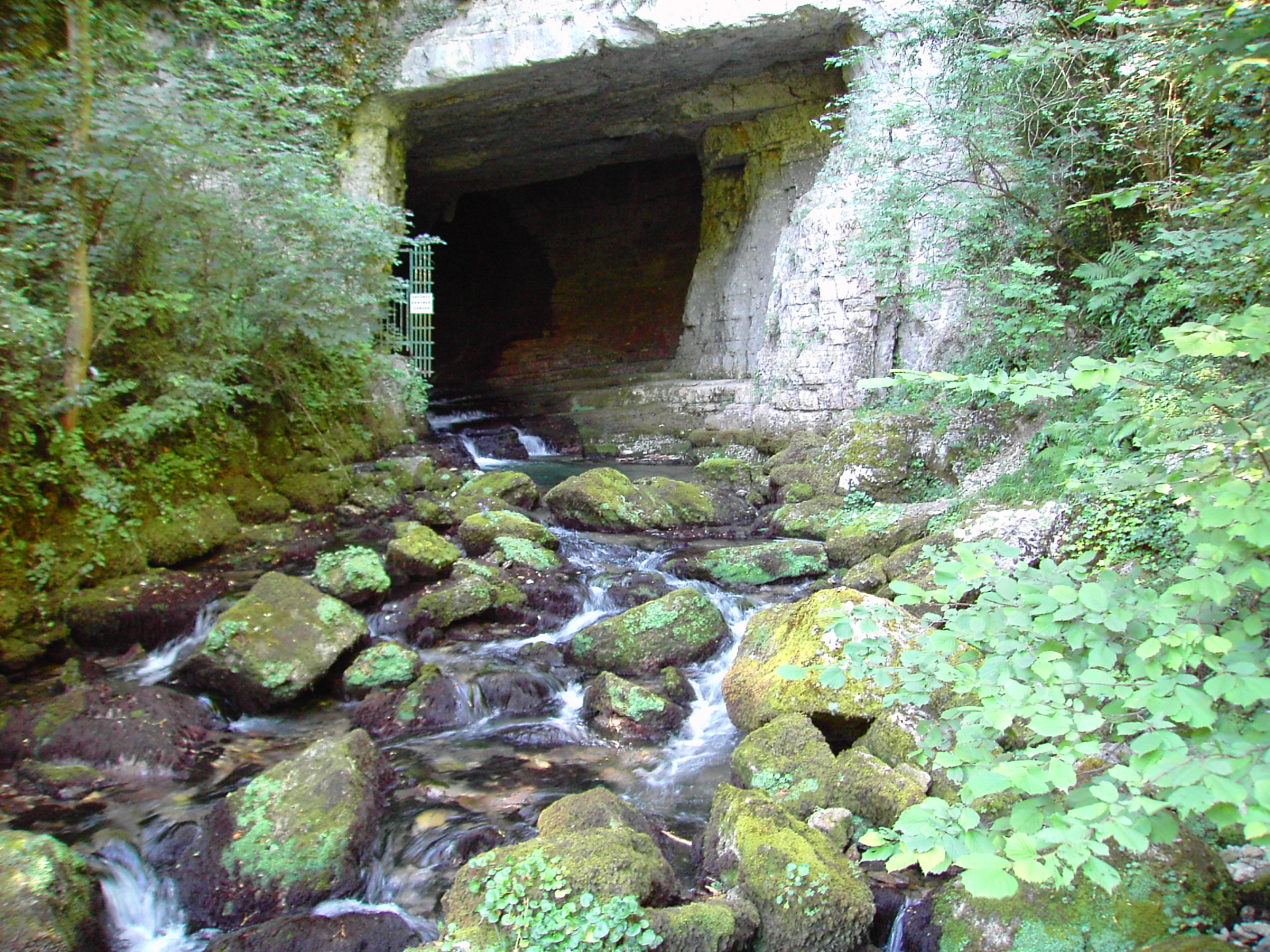
Grottes de Sassenage.

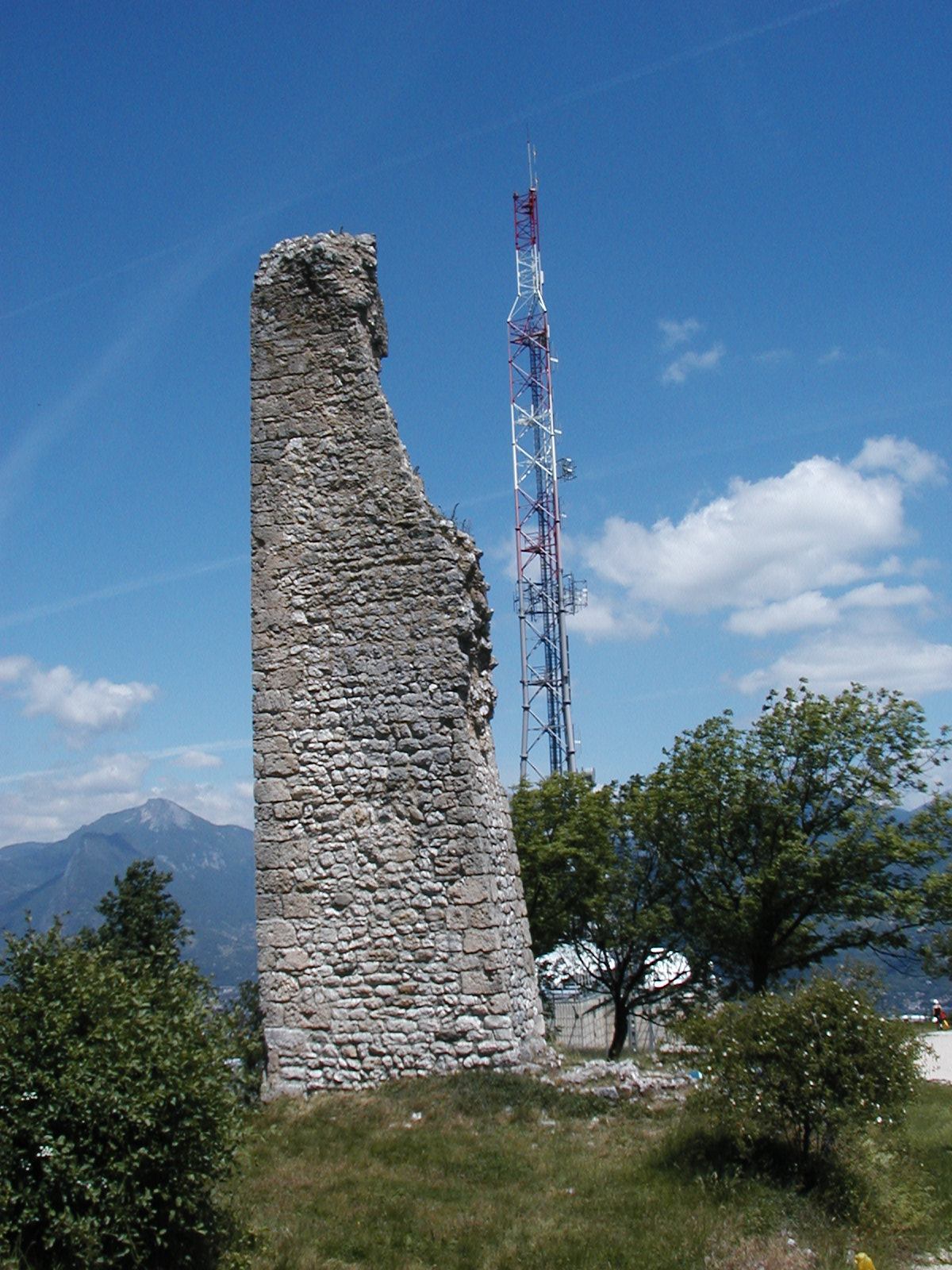
Tour Sans Venin.

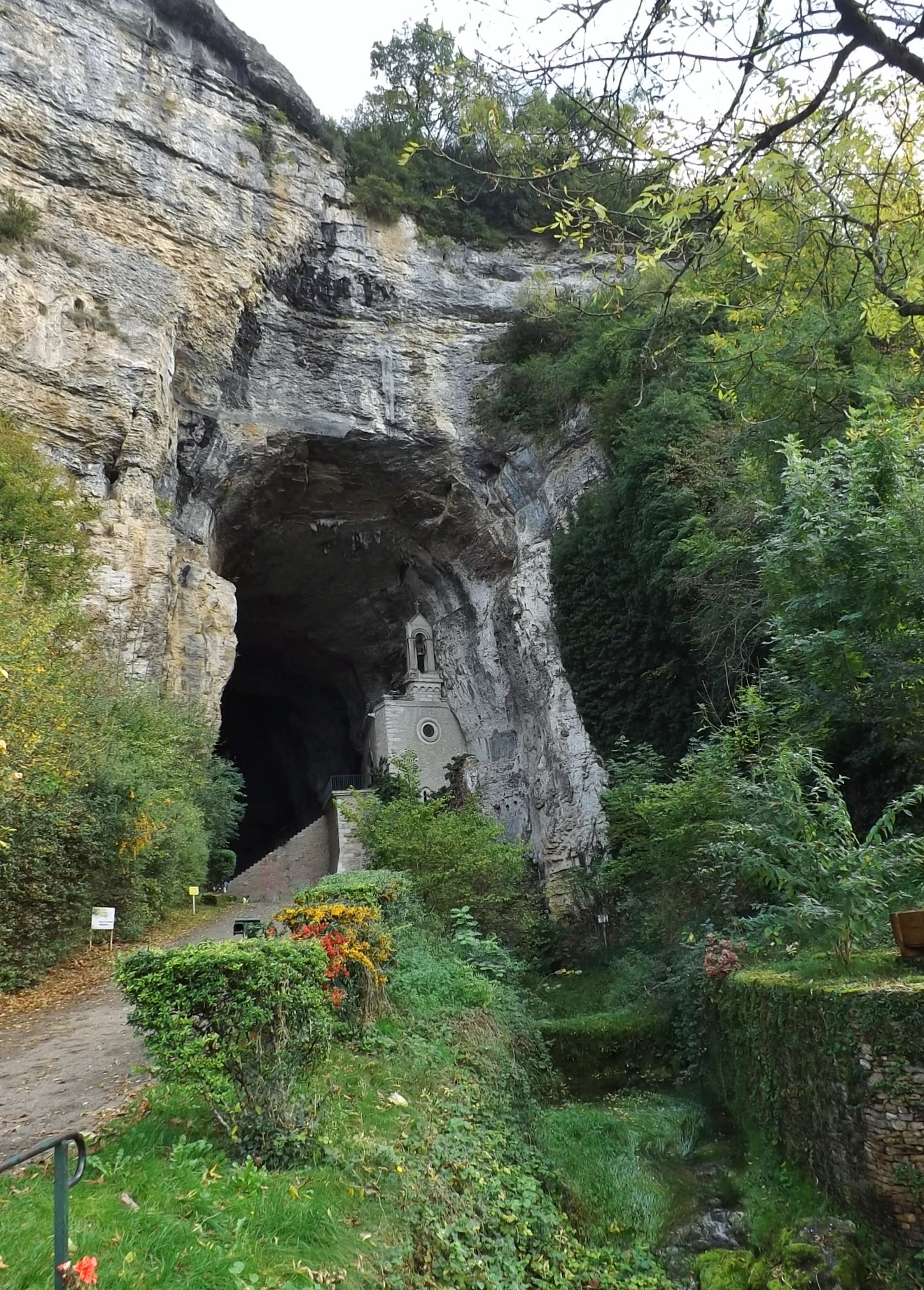
Grottes de la Balme.
