= Lac de Pétichet =

Lake in France

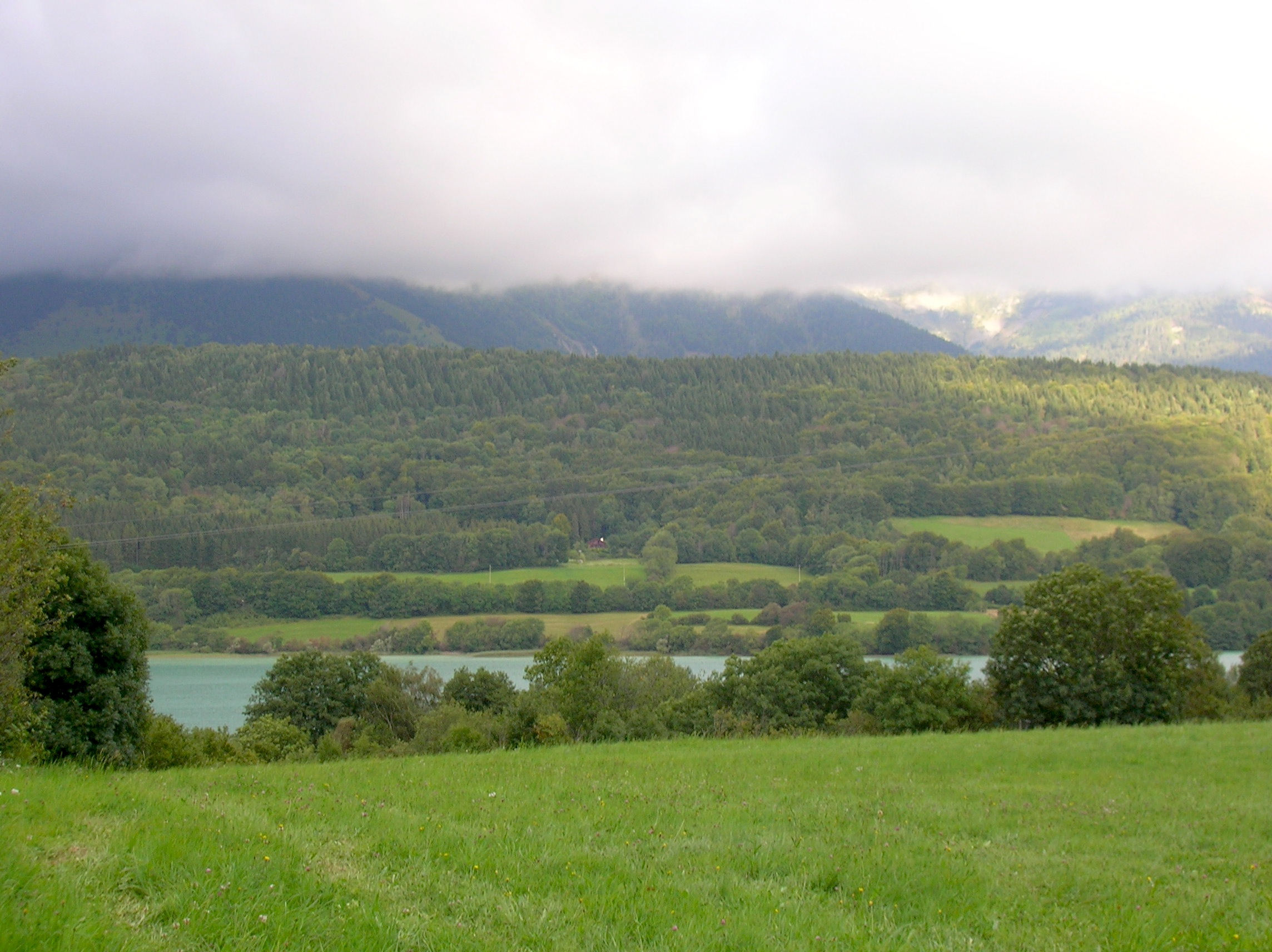
- Lac de Pétichet - From the church of Saint-Théoffrey, Isère, France.

- Location within France
- Location: Isère
- Coordinates: 44°59′23″N 5°46′45″E
- Basin countries: France
- Surface area: 80 ha (200 acres)
- Max. depth: 17 m (56 ft)
- Surface elevation: 930 m (3,050 ft)

Lac de Pétichet is a lake at Saint-Théoffrey in the Isère department of France, 400 m south of the Grand lac de Laffrey.
