= Bise =

Cold, dry wind of the Swiss Plateau

Bise on Lake Geneva

The Bise or bize (French: La Bise) is a cold, dry wind in Switzerland that blows through the Swiss Plateau from northeast to southwest. It typically arises when high-pressure systems over northern or eastern Europe create an air pressure difference that channels wind between the Jura mountains and the Alps. Occurring throughout the year, it brings dry weather in summer and often forms low stratus clouds in winter. The Bise has been associated with travel disruptions, agricultural damage, and weather-related physical symptoms, such as headaches.

== Formation and effects ==
The Bise develops when a high-pressure system over northern or eastern Europe coincides with low pressure over the Mediterranean, generating an east-to-northeast wind that moves westward across the Swiss Plateau. It flows through the natural corridor between the Jura mountains and the Alps, gaining strength where this gap narrows, particularly in western Switzerland. In summer, the Bise brings dry air and temperatures typical of the season. During winter, it can lead to the formation of high fog across the plateau and cause strong winds that may reach 100 km/h in the Lake Geneva region.

In addition to surface-level effects, the Bise often brings cold, humid air during winter that becomes trapped beneath an inversion layer, where temperature increases with altitude and limits vertical air exchange. This promotes the development of widespread low stratus clouds or fog on the Swiss Plateau. When the Bise is stronger, broken bands of cloud known as "cloud streets" may form instead of a uniform overcast sky. Though typically associated with dry weather, the Bise can also carry moisture from Alpine low-pressure systems, producing overcast conditions and precipitation, a variation known as the "black Bise". In western Switzerland, the Bise can reach storm-force intensity, with recorded gusts of over 100 km/h at Changin and 154 km/h at La Dôle.

The Bise can sometimes lead to severe icing during winter months in Geneva and nearby communities. Many foreign travellers to this Swiss city have commented upon the Bise.

== Wind patterns and measurement ==
The strength of the Bise wind can be determined by the analysis of the air pressure difference (in hectopascal [hPa]) between Geneva and Güttingen in canton of Thurgau. The Bise arises as soon as the air pressure in Güttingen (TG) is higher than in Geneva. The greater this air pressure difference, the stronger the Bise blows through the Swiss Plateau. In case of an inverted air pressure difference (low air pressure in Güttingen (TG) and high air pressure in Geneva), the opposite of Bise occurs: The wind blows from southwest through the Swiss Plateau.

== Etymology and cultural references ==
An alternative form in English is Biz. The term entered Middle English from French bise. Its origin is unknown.

The wind La Bise, along with Lake Geneva, is also mentioned in the song "Lonely Sky" which was penned and sung by the Irish singer Chris De Burgh. The song was released in 1975 on the album "Spanish Train and Other Stories". The La Bise is also mentioned in the lyrics of the French patriotic song La Strasbourgeoise by Gaston Villemer and Lucien Delormel.
