= Saint-Théoffrey =

- Commune
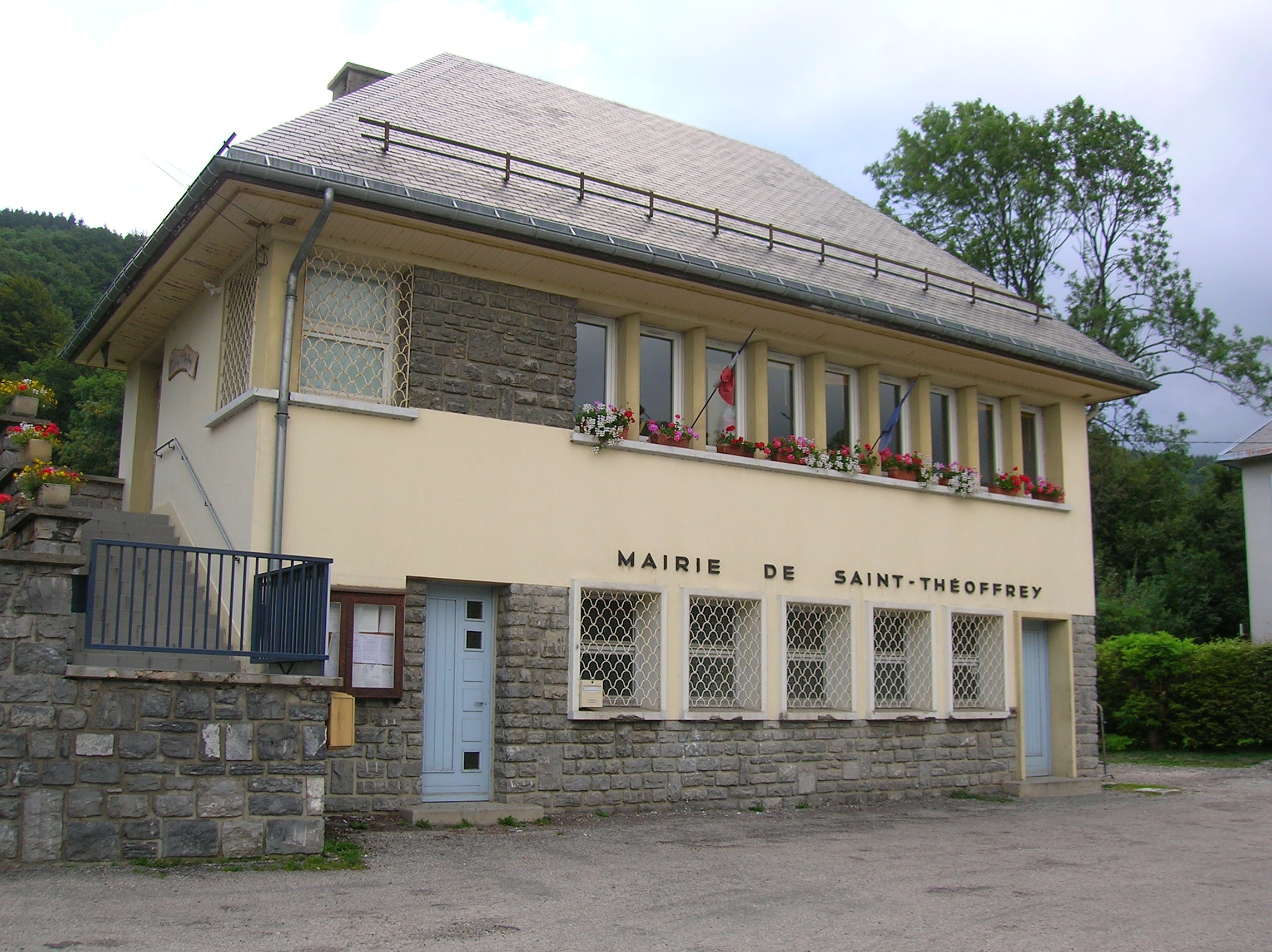
- Town hall
- Location of Saint-Théoffrey
- Location within France Location within Auvergne-Rhône-Alpes
- Coordinates: 44°59′59″N 5°46′25″E
- Country: France
- Region: Auvergne-Rhône-Alpes
- Department: Isère
- Arrondissement: Grenoble
- Canton: Matheysine-Trièves
- Intercommunality: Matheysine

Government
  - Mayor (2020–2026): Alain Mendez
- Area^{1}: 6 km^{2} (2.3 sq mi)
- Elevation: 940 m (3,080 ft)
- Highest elevation: 1,240 m (4,070 ft)
- Lowest elevation: 905 m (2,969 ft)
- Population (2023): 612
  - Density: 100/km^{2} (260/sq mi)
- Time zone: UTC+01:00 (CET)
  - Summer (DST): UTC+02:00 (CEST)
- INSEE/Postal code: 38462 /38119
- ^{1} French Land Register data, which excludes lakes, ponds, glaciers > 1 km^{2} (0.386 sq mi or 247 acres) and river estuaries.

Saint-Théoffrey (French pronunciation: [sɛ̃ teɔfʁɛ]) is a commune in the Isère department in southeastern France.

== Population ==
Historical population
Year	Pop.	±% p.a.
1968	171	—
1975	115	−5.51%
1982	210	+8.98%
1990	279	+3.62%
1999	342	+2.29%
2007	419	+2.57%
2012	450	+1.44%
2017	521	+2.97%
2023	612	+2.72%
Source: INSEE

== See also ==
- Communes of the Isère department
