= Grand lac de Laffrey =

Lake in France

Grand Lac de Laffrey
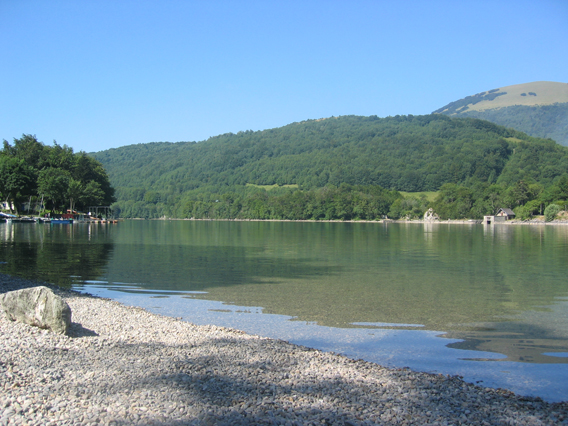

- Location within France
- Location: Isère
- Coordinates: 45°0′40″N 5°46′40″E
- Primary outflows: Laffrey
- Basin countries: France
- Max. length: 3 km (1.9 mi)
- Max. width: 0.5 km (0.31 mi)
- Surface area: 120 ha (300 acres)
- Average depth: 39 m (128 ft)
- Surface elevation: 911 m (2,989 ft)

The Grand lac de Laffrey (French pronunciation: [ɡʁɑ̃ lak də lafʁɛ], Great Laffrey lake) is the largest of the Laffrey lakes, located in Matheysine 23km south of Grenoble, in the Isère département of France.
