= Fénis =

Fénis Fén-íc (Valdôtain)
- Comune
- Comune di Fénis; Commune de Fénis
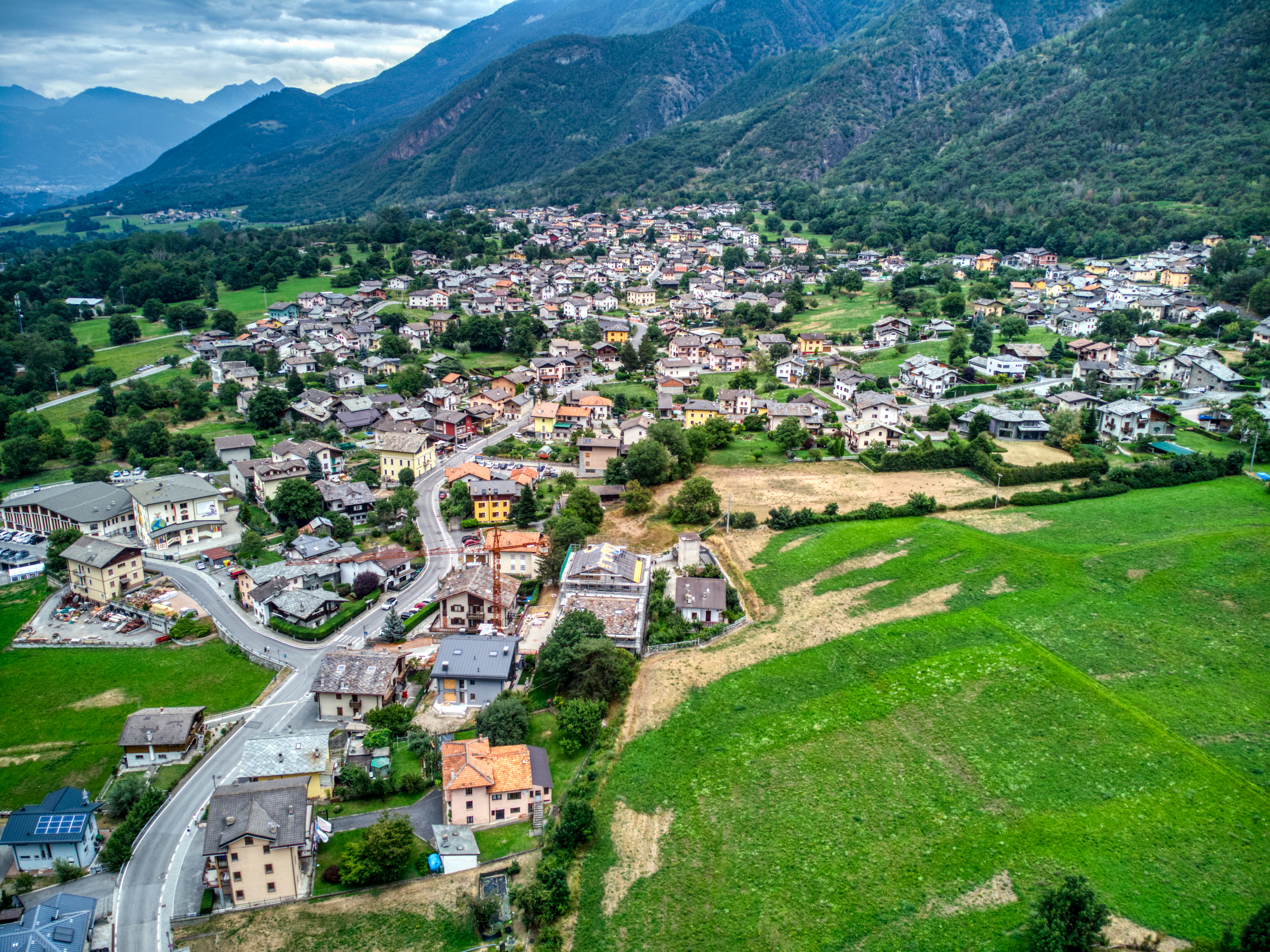
- Fénis

- Coat of arms

- Location within Italy Location within Aosta Valley
- Coordinates: 45°44′N 07°29′E
- Country: Italy
- Region: Aosta Valley
- Province: none
- Frazioni: Baraveyes, Barche, Champlan, La Cerise, Le Chénoz, Chez-Sapin, Chez-Croiset, Chez-Cuignon, Chez-Fontillon, Cors, Les Crêtes, Fagnan, Misérègne, Pareynaz, Perron, Pléod, Pommier, Ramolivaz, Rovarey, Tillier

Area
  - Total: 68 km^{2} (26 sq mi)
- Elevation: 541 m (1,775 ft)

Population (31 December 2022)
  - Total: 1,771
  - Density: 26/km^{2} (67/sq mi)
- Demonym: Fénisans or Fénisards
- Time zone: UTC+1 (CET)
  - Summer (DST): UTC+2 (CEST)
- Postal code: 11020
- Dialing code: 0165
- Patron saint: Saint Maurice
- Saint day: September 22
- Website: Official website

Fénis French pronunciation (Valdôtain: Fén-íc) is a town and comune in the Aosta Valley region of north-western Italy.

It is especially known for Fénis Castle, a well-preserved medieval castle.

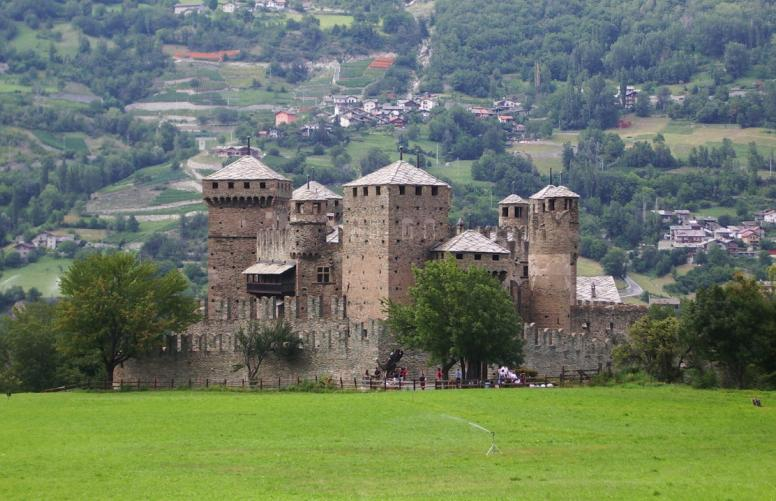
The Fénis Castle.
