= Aroley Formation =

Geologic formation in France and Switzerland

Couches de l’Aroley
- Stratigraphic range: Barremian
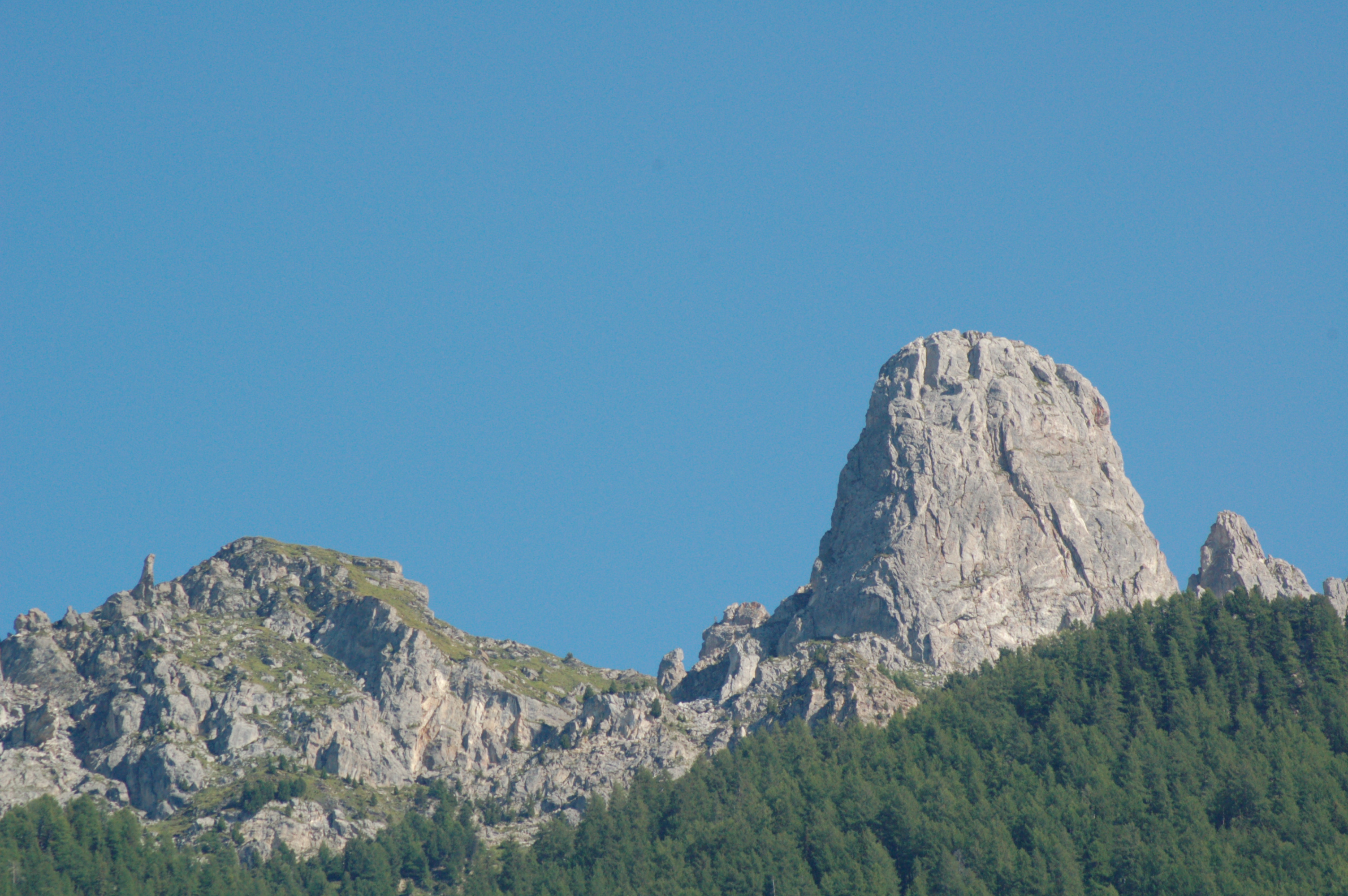
- Pierre Avoi is the type locality of the Aroley formation
- Type: Geological formation
- Unit of: Valais trilogy
- Underlies: Couches des Marmontains
- Overlies: Brèches du Grand Fond Group
- Thickness: Averaging 100 m (330 ft)

Lithology
- Primary: Calcitic schist
- Other: Fine conglomerate

Location
- Coordinates: 45.696144°N 6.734438°E
- Region: Savoie
- Country: France, Switzerland

Type section
- Named for: Plan Aroley

The Couches de l’Aroley (short: Aroley Formation) are a sedimentary formation deposited during the Early Cretaceous (Barremian to Aptian). They consist of calcitic schists with dolomite clasts interbedded with finegrained conglomerates. The whole sequence is about 100 m thick.

The Couches de l’Aroley are the lowest of the three post-rift sequences deposited in the Valais ocean. It overlies syn-rift sequences of the Brèches du Grand Fond Group.

The Aroley Formation can be found within the following nappes:

- External Valais
  - Moûtiers unit
  - Roc de l'Enfer unit
  - Petit St. Bernard unit
- Internal Valais
  - Versoyen unit

The type locality is the Massif de la Pierre Avoi, in Saxon, Valais, Switzerland. The formation is named after a "Plan Aroley" which lies below the Pierre Avoi. It was first described by Rudolf Trümpy 1952.

The Couches de l’Aroley can be correlated with the Klus Formation and the Tristel Formation found in eastern Switzerland, the Engadin window and the Tauern window.
