= Grand Fond Group =

Brèches du Grand Fond Group
- Stratigraphic range: Middle Jurassic
- Type: Geological group
- Sub-units: Pyramides Calcaires Formation; Dent d'Arpire Formation
- Underlies: Couches de l’Aroley
- Overlies: Basement (Valais pre-rift)

Lithology
- Primary: Conglomerate of pre-rift rocks.

Location
- Coordinates: 45.696144°N 6.734438°E
- Region: Savoie
- Country: France

The Brèches du Grand Fond Group is a group of stratigraphic formations in France that were deposited between the Middle Jurassic and the Early Cretaceous. The deposition was contemporaneous to the rifting of the Valais ocean, and overlies the pre-rift rocks along an angular unconformity. The Brèches du Grand Fond Group is overlain by the post-rift sequences Couches de l’Aroley, Couches des Marmontains and the Couches de Saint Christophe.

The Brèches du Grand Fond Group consists of two formations that are found in the External Valais units, the younger Pyramides Calcaires Formation and the older Dent d'Arpire Formation. The deposition of these two units was roughly contemporaneous to the deposition of the Brèches du Collet des Rousses and the Complexe Antéflysch Formation of the Internal Valais units.

In general the Brèches du Grand Fond Group consists of coarse grained clastic sediments composed of pre-rift lithologies. Outcrops can be studied

The Brèches du Grand Fond Group can be found within the following nappes:

- External Valais

- Moûtiers unit
- Roc de l'Enfer unit

Outcrops occur to the northwest of Bourg-Saint-Maurice.
