= Trient, Switzerland =

Trient
- Municipality
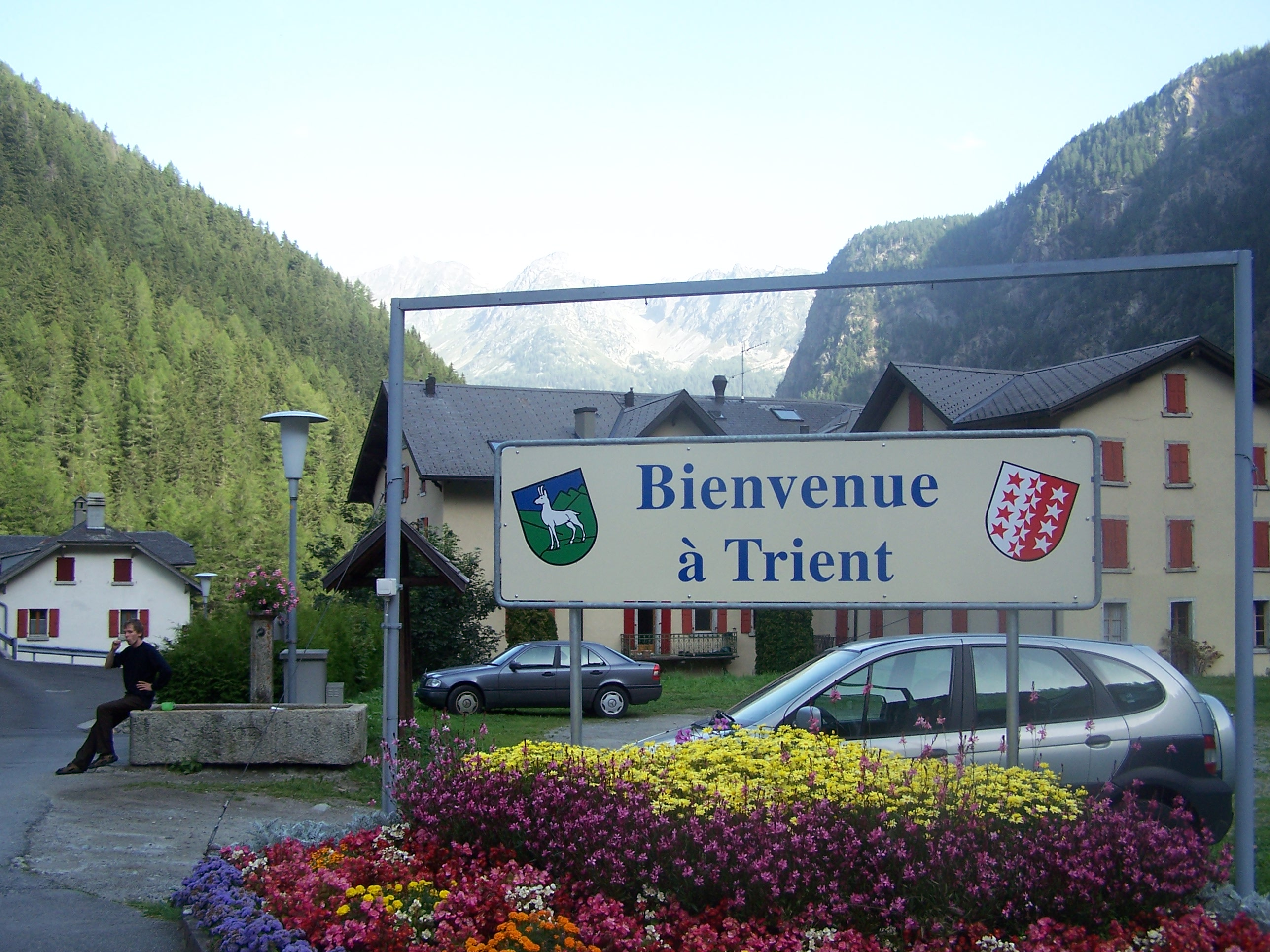
- Trient village

- Flag Coat of arms
- Location of Trient
- Location within Switzerland Location within Canton of Valais
- Coordinates: 46°3′N 7°0′E
- Country: Switzerland
- Canton: Valais
- District: Martigny

Government
  - Mayor: Aloïse Balzan

Area
  - Total: 39.6 km^{2} (15.3 sq mi)
- Elevation: 1,300 m (4,300 ft)

Population (December 2002)
  - Total: 138
  - Density: 3.48/km^{2} (9.03/sq mi)
- Time zone: UTC+01:00 (CET)
  - Summer (DST): UTC+02:00 (CEST)
- Postal code: 1929
- SFOS number: 6142
- ISO 3166 code: CH-VS
- Surrounded by: Chamonix-Mont-Blanc (FR-74), Finhaut, Martigny-Combe, Orsières, Salvan, Vallorcine (FR-74)
- Website: www.trient.ch

Trient is also the German name for the city of Trento, Italy

Trient (French pronunciation: [tʁiɛ̃]; Arpitan: Treyent) is a municipality in the district of Martigny in the canton of Valais in Switzerland.

== History ==
In 1900 the municipality was created, when it separated from Martigny-Combe.

== Geography ==
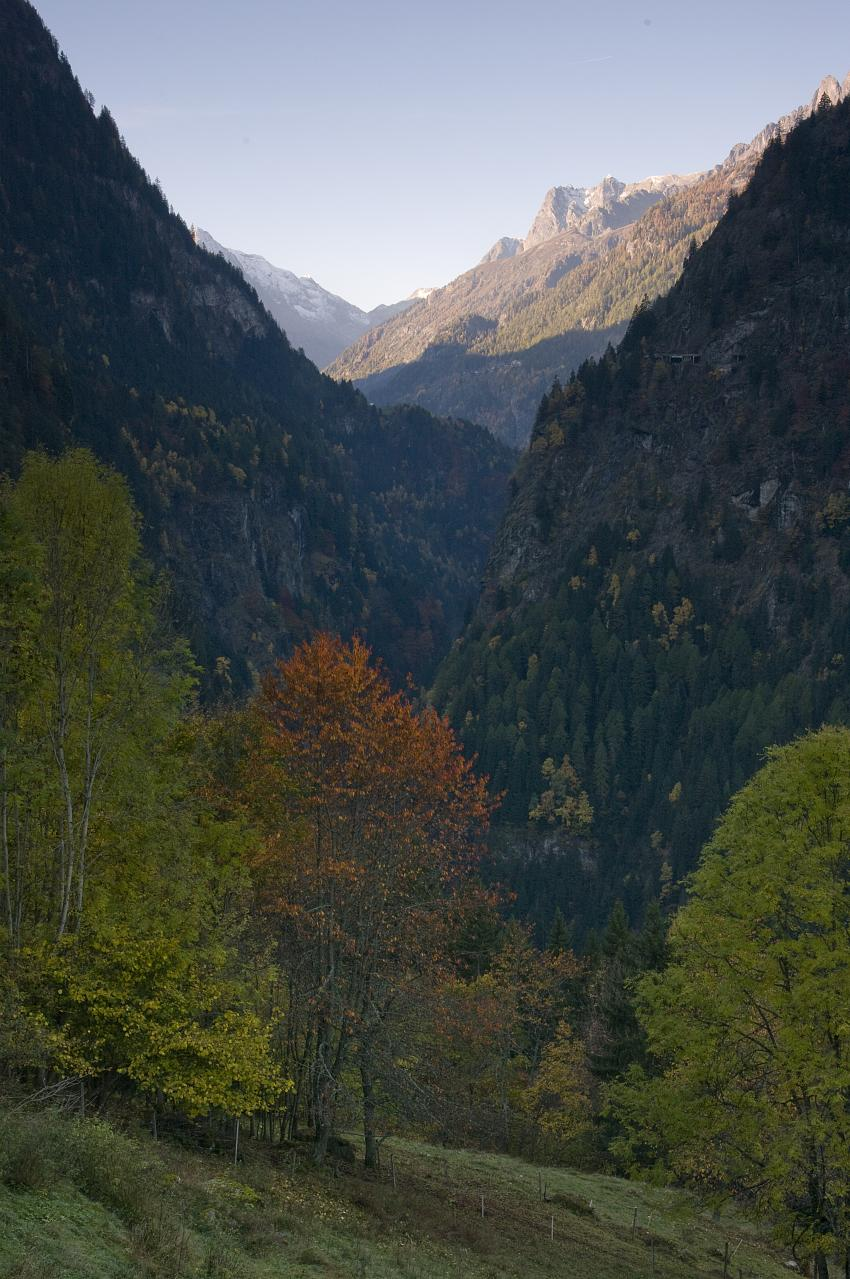
Trient valley

Trient has an area, as of 2011, of 39.5 square kilometers (15.3 mi^{2}). Of this area, 12.4% is used for agricultural purposes, while 31.2% is forested. Of the rest of the land, 0.8% is settled (buildings or roads) and 55.6% is unproductive land.

== Coat of arms ==
The blazon of the municipal coat of arms is Azure on a plane in front of mountains Vert a Chamois statant Argent.

== Demographics ==
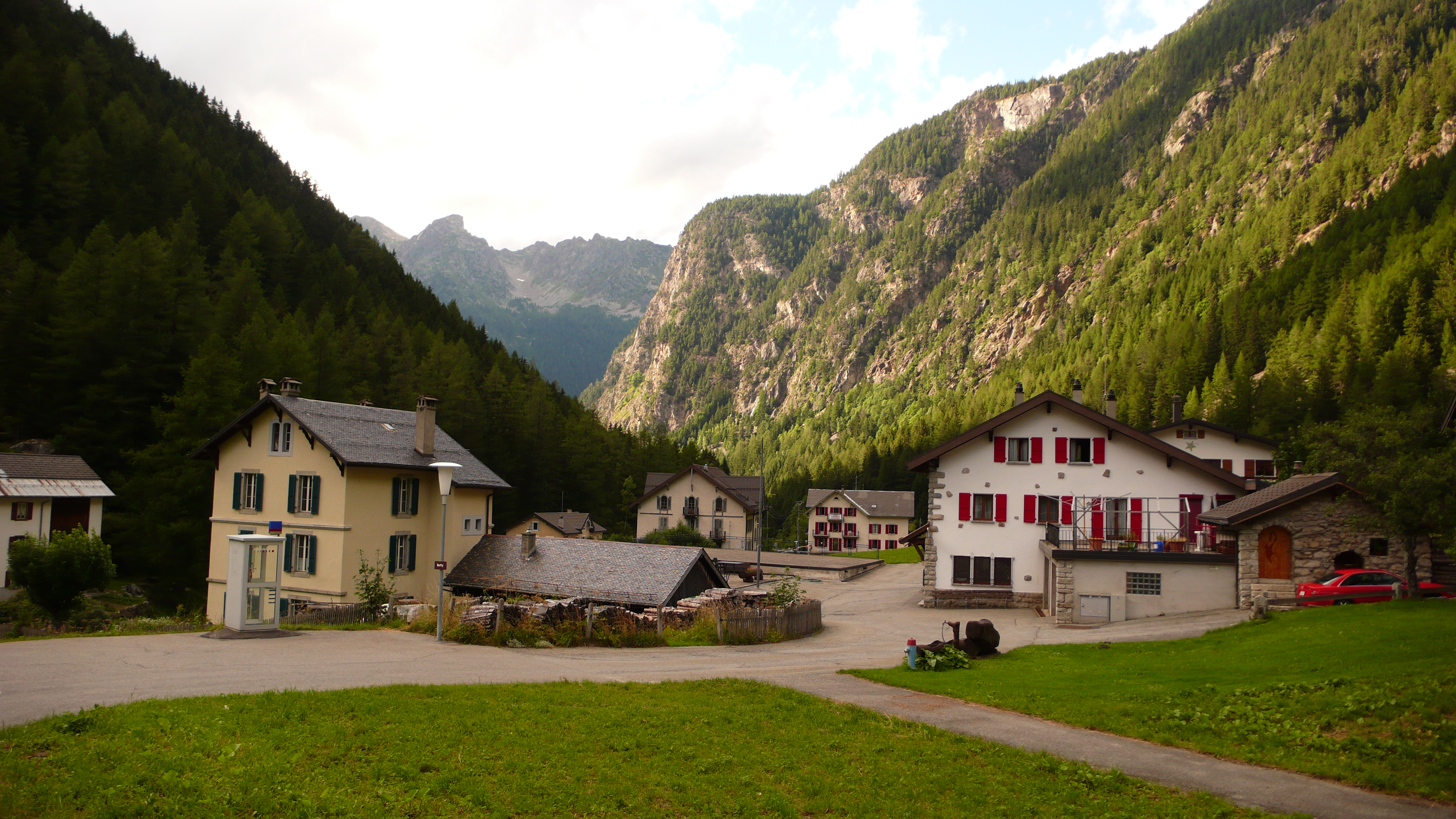
Trient village

Trient has a population (as of December 2020) of 163. As of 2008, 6.2% of the population are resident foreign nationals. Over the last 10 years (2000–2010 ) the population has changed at a rate of 3.5%. It has changed at a rate of 2.8% due to migration and at a rate of 1.4% due to births and deaths.

Most of the population (as of 2000) speaks French (125 or 96.2%) as their first language, German is the second most common (2 or 1.5%) and Portuguese is the third (2 or 1.5%).

As of 2008, the population was 47.6% male and 52.4% female. The population was made up of 64 Swiss men (43.5% of the population) and 6 (4.1%) non-Swiss men. There were 73 Swiss women (49.7%) and 4 (2.7%) non-Swiss women. Of the population in the municipality, 53 or about 40.8% were born in Trient and lived there in 2000. There were 45 or 34.6% who were born in the same canton, while 17 or 13.1% were born somewhere else in Switzerland, and 11 or 8.5% were born outside of Switzerland.

As of 2000, children and teenagers (0–19 years old) make up 28.5% of the population, while adults (20–64 years old) make up 54.6% and seniors (over 64 years old) make up 16.9%.

As of 2000, there were 53 people who were single and never married in the municipality. There were 67 married individuals, 6 widows or widowers and 4 individuals who are divorced.

As of 2000, there were 51 private households in the municipality, and an average of 2.5 persons per household. There were 13 households that consist of only one person and 7 households with five or more people. In 2000, a total of 49 apartments (36.6% of the total) were permanently occupied, while 66 apartments (49.3%) were seasonally occupied and 19 apartments (14.2%) were empty. The vacancy rate for the municipality, in 2010, was 1.48%.

The historical population is given in the following chart:

== Politics ==
In the 2007 federal election the most popular party was the FDP which received 39.31% of the vote. The next three most popular parties were the CVP (25.96%), the SP (12.43%) and the SVP (12.43%). In the federal election, a total of 83 votes were cast, and the voter turnout was 76.1%.

In the 2009 Conseil d'Etat/Staatsrat election a total of 57 votes were cast, of which or about 0.0% were invalid. The voter participation was 62.6%, which is much more than the cantonal average of 54.67%. In the 2007 Swiss Council of States election a total of 72 votes were cast, of which 5 or about 6.9% were invalid. The voter participation was 77.4%, which is much more than the cantonal average of 59.88%.

== Economy ==
As of 2010, Trient had an unemployment rate of 5.3%. As of 2008, there were 4 people employed in the primary economic sector and about 2 businesses involved in this sector. 8 people were employed in the secondary sector and there were 2 businesses in this sector. 25 people were employed in the tertiary sector, with 6 businesses in this sector. There were 55 residents of the municipality who were employed in some capacity, of which females made up 43.6% of the workforce.

In 2008 the total number of full-time equivalent jobs was 32. The number of jobs in the primary sector was 2, all of which were in agriculture. The number of jobs in the secondary sector was 8 of which 1 was in manufacturing and 7 (87.5%) were in construction. The number of jobs in the tertiary sector was 22. In the tertiary sector; 18 or 81.8% were in a hotel or restaurant, 2 or 9.1% were in education.

In 2000, there were 12 workers who commuted into the municipality and 31 workers who commuted away. The municipality is a net exporter of workers, with about 2.6 workers leaving the municipality for every one entering. Of the working population, 3.6% used public transportation to get to work, and 67.3% used a private car.

== Religion ==
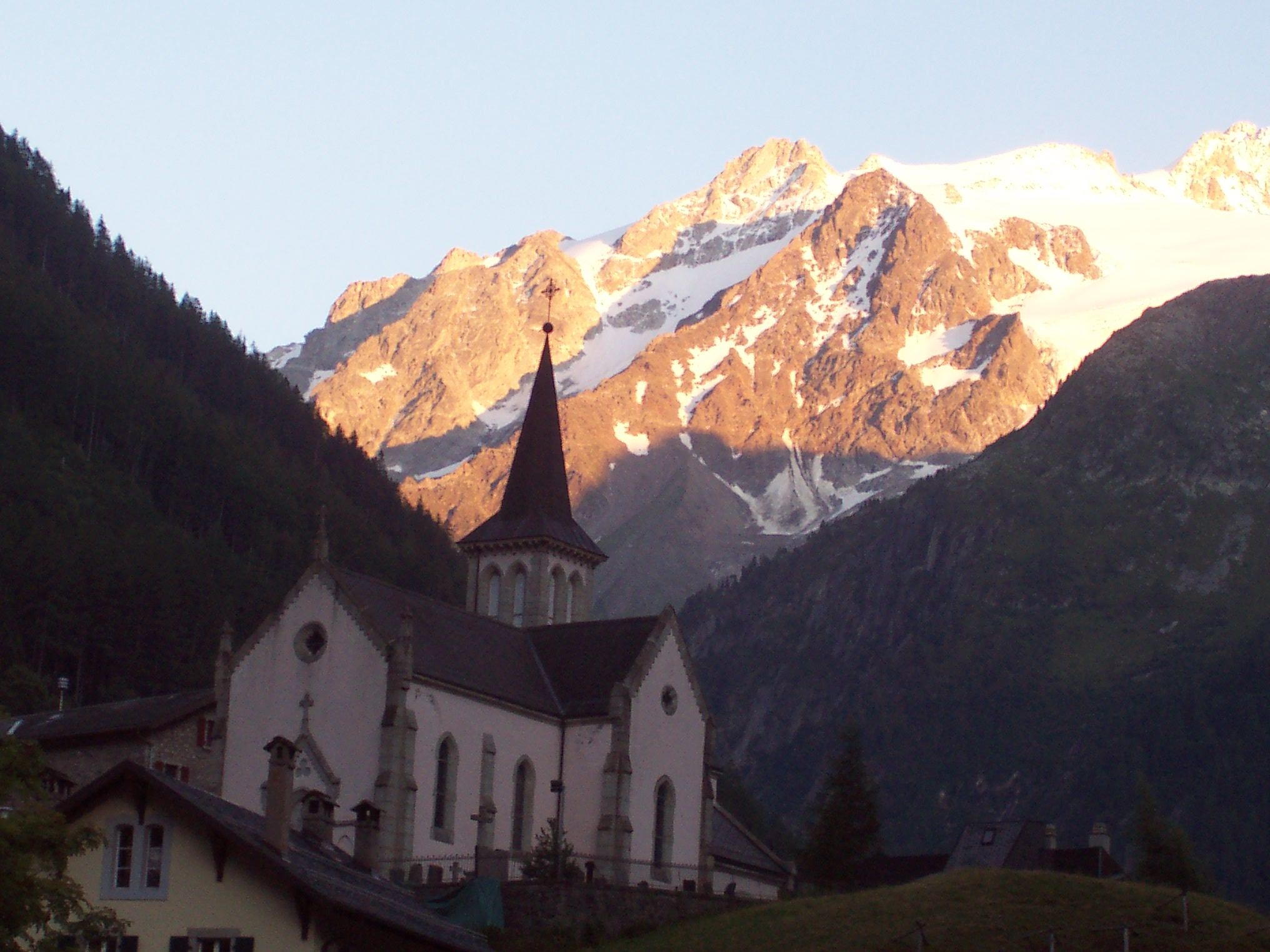
Church in Trient

From the 2000 census, 107 or 82.3% were Roman Catholic, while 12 or 9.2% belonged to the Swiss Reformed Church. Of the rest of the population, there was 1 member of an Orthodox church. 2 (or about 1.54% of the population) belonged to no church, are agnostic or atheist, and 8 individuals (or about 6.15% of the population) did not answer the question.

== Education ==
In Trient about 55 or (42.3%) of the population have completed non-mandatory upper secondary education, and 7 or (5.4%) have completed additional higher education (either university or a Fachhochschule). Of the 7 who completed tertiary schooling, 85.7% were Swiss men, 14.3% were Swiss women.

As of 2000, there were 6 students from Trient who attended schools outside the municipality.
