= Martigny District =

Martigny District de Martigny
- District
- Flag Coat of arms
- Coordinates: 46°06′N 7°04′E
- Country: Switzerland
- Canton: Valais
- Capital: Martigny

Area
  - Total: 263.5 km^{2} (101.7 sq mi)

Population (2020)
  - Total: 48,906
  - Density: 185.6/km^{2} (480.7/sq mi)
- Time zone: UTC+1 (CET)
  - Summer (DST): UTC+2 (CEST)
- Municipalities: 10

The district of Martigny is a district in the canton of Valais in Switzerland. It has a population of 48,906 (as of 31 December 2020).

== Municipalities ==
It comprises the following municipalities:

Municipality	Population (31 December 2020)	Area km^{2}
Bovernier	911	12.86
Fully	8,793	37.79
Isérables	827	15.23
Leytron	3,230	26.85
Martigny	18,291	32.6
Martigny-Combe	2,333	37.41
Riddes	3,277	23.9
Saillon	2,818	13.74
Saxon	6,278	23.23
Trient	163	39.56
Total	48,906	263.35

== Coat of arms ==
The blazon of the municipal coat of arms is Gules, a Lion rampant double-queued Argent holding a mallet Or.

== Demographics ==
Martigny has a population (as of December 2020) of 48,906. Most of the population (as of 2000) speaks French (29,848 or 88.6%) as their first language, Portuguese is the second most common (1,268 or 3.8%) and Italian is the third (818 or 2.4%). There are 516 people who speak German and 17 people who speak Romansh.

As of 2008, the gender distribution of the population was 49.4% male and 50.6% female. The population was made up of 14,638 Swiss men (36.4% of the population) and 5,224 (13.0%) non-Swiss men. There were 15,790 Swiss women (39.3%) and 4,518 (11.2%) non-Swiss women. Of the population in the district 15,012 or about 44.6% were born in Martigny and lived there in 2000. There were 8,129 or 24.1% who were born in the same canton, while 3,114 or 9.2% were born somewhere else in Switzerland, and 6,505 or 19.3% were born outside of Switzerland.

As of 2000, there were 13,777 people who were single and never married in the district. There were 16,152 married individuals, 2,192 widows or widowers and 1,572 individuals who are divorced.

There were 4,529 households that consist of only one person and 1,073 households with five or more people. Out of a total of 13,999 households that answered this question, 32.4% were households made up of just one person and there were 167 adults who lived with their parents. Of the rest of the households, there are 3,294 married couples without children, 4,609 married couples with children There were 860 single parents with a child or children. There were 171 households that were made up of unrelated people and 369 households that were made up of some sort of institution or another collective housing.

Historical population

Year	Pop.	±%
1850	8,617	—
1860	9,928	+15.2%
1870	10,831	+9.1%
1880	11,245	+3.8%
1888	11,535	+2.6%
1900	12,645	+9.6%

Year	Pop.	±%
1910	14,362	+13.6%
1920	14,719	+2.5%
1930	15,392	+4.6%
1941	17,613	+14.4%
1950	19,129	+8.6%
1960	21,106	+10.3%

Year	Pop.	±%
1970	24,669	+16.9%
1980	25,809	+4.6%
1990	30,674	+18.9%
2000	33,693	+9.8%

== Mergers and name changes ==
On 1 August 1964 the former municipalities of Martigny-Bourg and Martigny-Ville merged to form the new municipality of Martigny.

On 1 January 2021 the former municipality of Charrat merged into the municipality of Martigny.

== Politics ==
In the 2007 federal election the most popular party was the CVP which received 30.87% of the vote. The next three most popular parties were the FDP (29.7%), the SVP (15.87%) and the SP (12.66%). In the federal election, a total of 14,438 votes were cast, and the voter turnout was 60.8%.

In the 2009 Conseil d'État/Staatsrat election a total of 12,925 votes were cast, of which 887 or about 6.9% were invalid. The voter participation was 54.2%, which is similar to the cantonal average of 54.67%. In the 2007 Swiss Council of States election a total of 14,242 votes were cast, of which 1,055 or about 7.4% were invalid. The voter participation was 61.0%, which is similar to the cantonal average of 59.88%.

== Religion ==
From the 2000 census, 27,493 or 81.6% were Roman Catholic, while 1,624 or 4.8% belonged to the Swiss Reformed Church. Of the rest of the population, there were 185 members of an Orthodox church (or about 0.55% of the population), there were 22 individuals (or about 0.07% of the population) who belonged to the Christian Catholic Church, and there were 508 individuals (or about 1.51% of the population) who belonged to another Christian church. There were 4 individuals (or about 0.01% of the population) who were Jewish, and 1,155 (or about 3.43% of the population) who were Islamic. There were 41 individuals who were Buddhist, 21 individuals who were Hindu and 39 individuals who belonged to another church. 1,478 (or about 4.39% of the population) belonged to no church, are agnostic or atheist, and 1,365 individuals (or about 4.05% of the population) did not answer the question.

== Education ==
In Martigny about 10,545 or (31.3%) of the population have completed non-mandatory upper secondary education, and 3,057 or (9.1%) have completed additional higher education (either University or a Fachhochschule). Of the 3,057 who completed tertiary schooling, 55.4% were Swiss men, 29.2% were Swiss women, 9.4% were non-Swiss men and 5.9% were non-Swiss women.
