= Martigny-Combe =

- Municipality
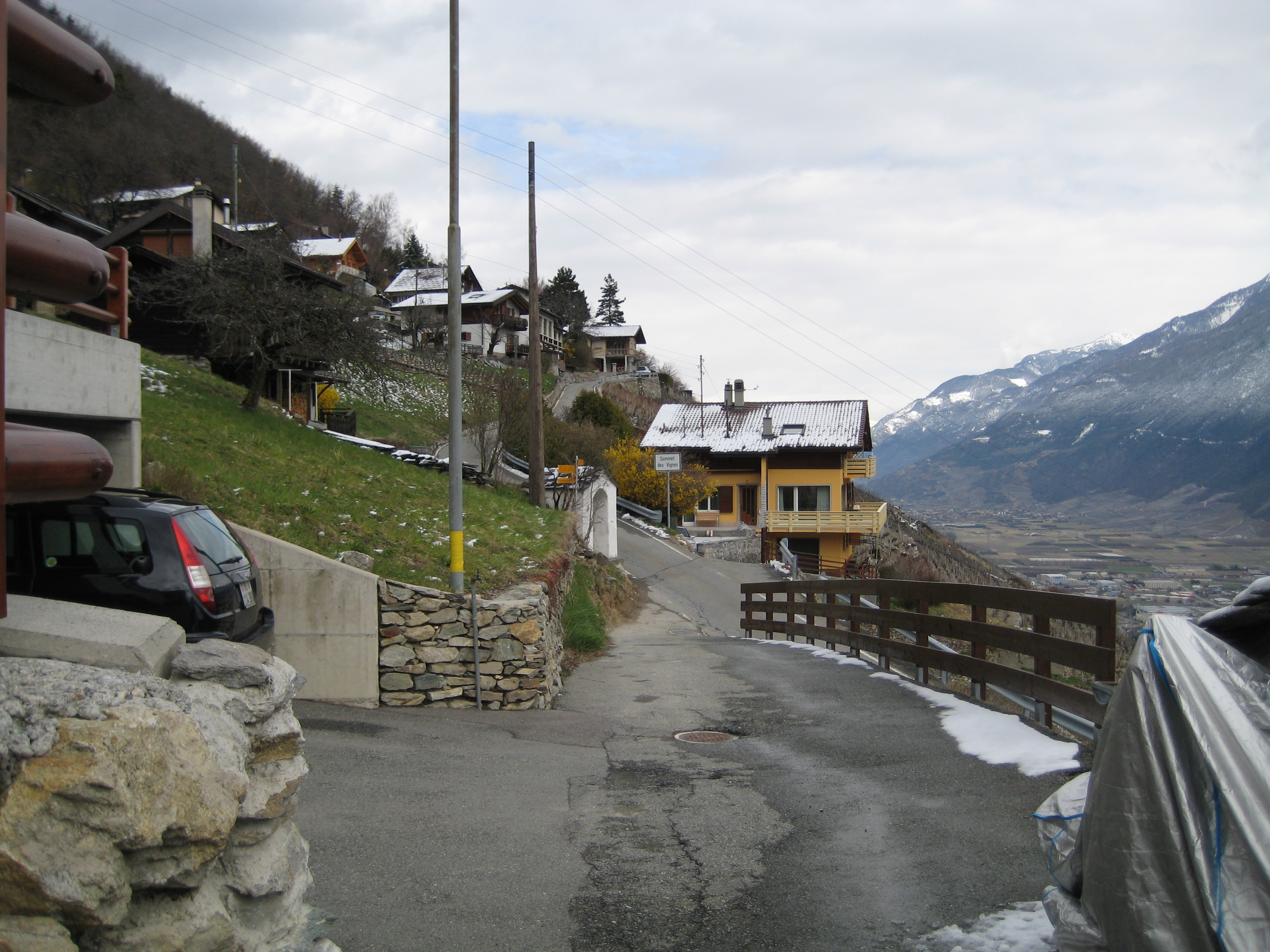
- Sommet-des-Vignes, a section in Martigny-Combe

- Flag Coat of arms
- Location of Martigny-Combe
- Location within Switzerland Location within Canton of Valais
- Coordinates: 46°5′N 7°3′E
- Country: Switzerland
- Canton: Valais
- District: Martigny

Government
  - Mayor: Philippe Pierroz

Area
  - Total: 37.7 km^{2} (14.6 sq mi)
- Elevation: 804 m (2,638 ft)

Population (December 2002)
  - Total: 1,714
  - Density: 45.5/km^{2} (118/sq mi)
- Time zone: UTC+01:00 (CET)
  - Summer (DST): UTC+02:00 (CEST)
- Postal code: 1921
- SFOS number: 6137
- ISO 3166 code: CH-VS
- Localities: Martigny-Croix, Le Brocard, Le Borgeaud, Les Rappes, La Fontaine, Le Cergneux, Le Fays, Le Sommet-des-Vignes, Ravoire
- Surrounded by: Bovernier, Martigny, Orsières, Salvan, Trient
- Twin towns: Pont-l'Abbé-d'Arnoult (France)
- Website: https://www.martigny-combe.ch SFSO statistics

Martigny-Combe is a municipality in the district of Martigny in the canton of Valais in Switzerland.

== History ==
Martigny-Combe is first mentioned in 1841 as La Combe. In 1844 it was first mentioned as Martigny-Combe.

== Geography ==
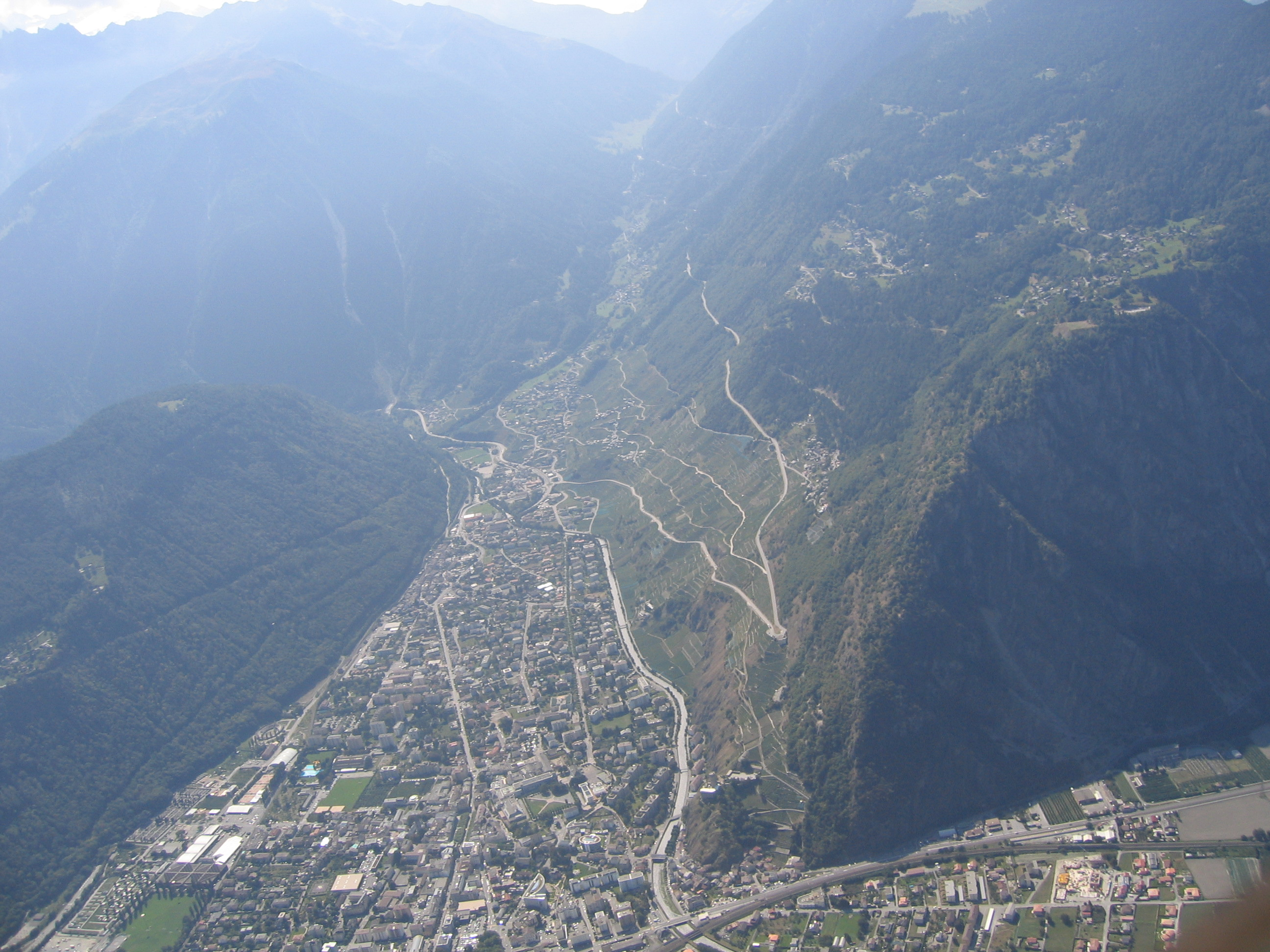
The Combe valley with parts of Martigny-Combe

Martigny-Combe has an area, as of 2011, of 37.7 square kilometers (14.6 mi^{2}). Of this area, 15.5% is used for agricultural purposes, while 63.4% is forested. Of the rest of the land, 3.2% is settled (buildings or roads) and 17.9% is unproductive land.

The municipality is located in the Martigny district. The western boundary of the municipality is the Trient river and the eastern is the Dranse. It climbs from the Rhone valley up to an elevation of 2,700 m (8,900 ft). It lies at the intersection of two major, international transportation routes, the Great St. Bernard Pass into Italy and the Col de la Forclaz into France. It consists of the main village of La Croix along with the villages of Le Brocard, Le Borgeaud, Les Rappes, Le Fays and Ravoireand and the hamlets of Plan-Cerisier, Le Perrey and La Crettaz.

== Coat of arms ==
The blazon of the municipal coat of arms is Gules, a Lion rampant Argent holding a Mallet Or.

== Demographics ==
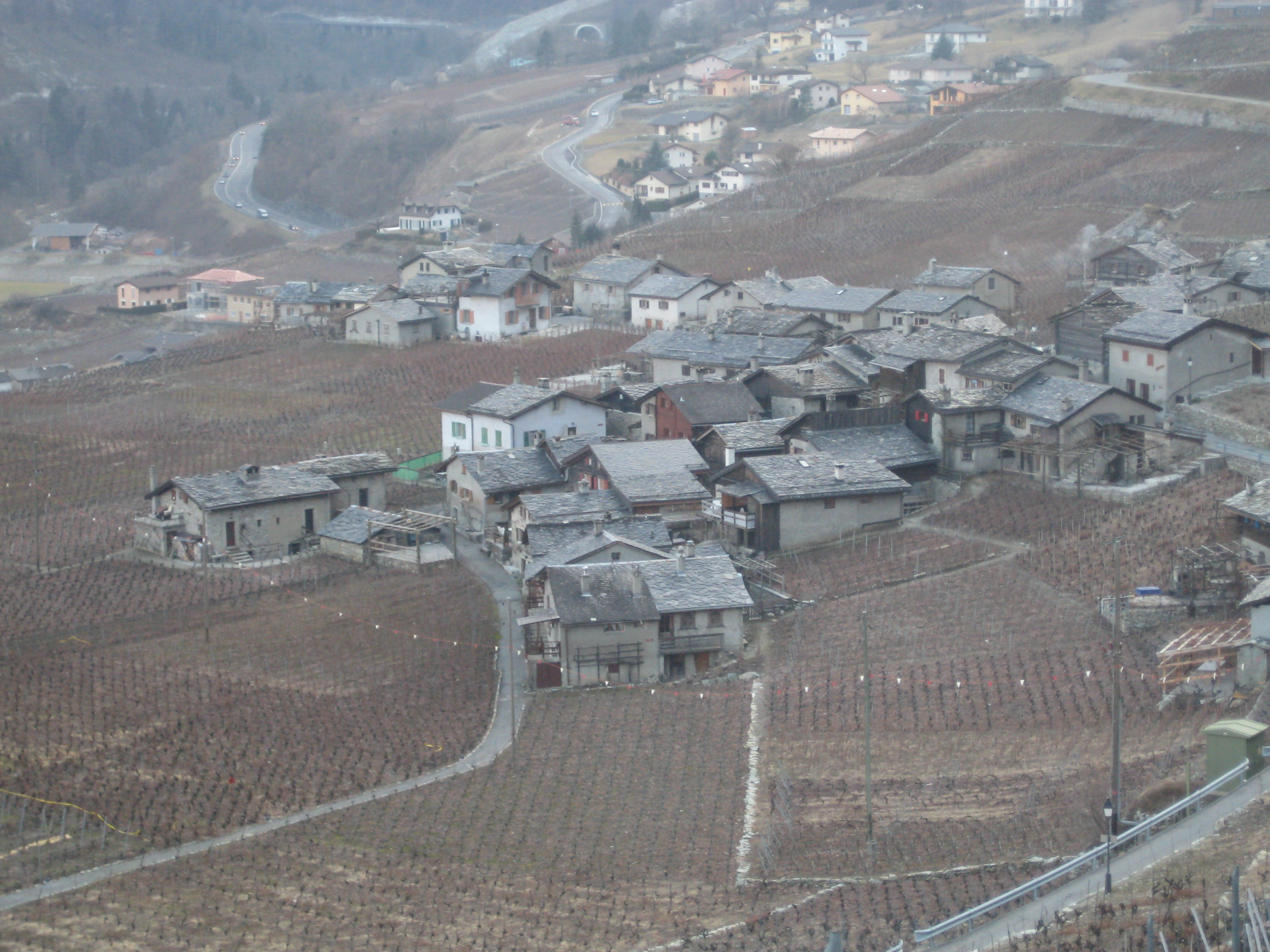
Plan-Cerisier hamlet

Martigny-Combe has a population (as of December 2020) of 2,333. As of 2008, 11.4% of the population are resident foreign nationals. Over the last 10 years (2000–2010 ) the population has changed at a rate of 30.1%. It has changed at a rate of 20.4% due to migration and at a rate of 1.6% due to births and deaths.

Most of the population (as of 2000) speaks French (1,625 or 93.9%) as their first language, German is the second most common (34 or 2.0%) and Italian is the third (25 or 1.4%). There is 1 person who speaks Romansh.

As of 2008, the gender distribution of the population was 52.3% male and 47.7% female. The population was made up of 950 Swiss men (45.4% of the population) and 144 (6.9%) non-Swiss men. There were 907 Swiss women (43.4%) and 91 (4.3%) non-Swiss women.

Of the population in the municipality, 596 or about 34.4% were born in Martigny-Combe and lived there in 2000. There were 652 or 37.7% who were born in the same canton, while 244 or 14.1% were born somewhere else in Switzerland, and 198 or 11.4% were born outside of Switzerland.

The age distribution of the population (as of 2000) is children and teenagers (0–19 years old) make up 23.8% of the population, while adults (20–64 years old) make up 61.4% and seniors (over 64 years old) make up 14.8%.

As of 2000, there were 698 people who were single and never married in the municipality. There were 856 married individuals, 93 widows or widowers and 84 individuals who are divorced.

As of 2000, there were 753 private households in the municipality, and an average of 2.2 persons per household. There were 285 households that consist of only one person and 46 households with five or more people. In 2000, a total of 691 apartments (59.4% of the total) were permanently occupied, while 392 apartments (33.7%) were seasonally occupied and 81 apartments (7.0%) were empty. As of 2009, the construction rate of new housing units was 3.8 new units per 1000 residents.

The historical population is given in the following chart:

== Sights ==
The entire area of Plan Cerisier is designated as part of the Inventory of Swiss Heritage Sites.

== Politics ==
In the 2007 federal election the most popular party was the CVP which received 39.65% of the vote. The next three most popular parties were the FDP (20.43%), the SVP (14.87%) and the SP (14.78%). In the federal election, a total of 893 votes were cast, and the voter turnout was 61.0%.

In the 2009 Conseil d'État/Staatsrat election a total of 729 votes were cast, of which 49 or about 6.7% were invalid. The voter participation was 49.9%, which is similar to the cantonal average of 54.67%. In the 2007 Swiss Council of States election a total of 877 votes were cast, of which 62 or about 7.1% were invalid. The voter participation was 61.4%, which is similar to the cantonal average of 59.88%.

== Economy ==
As of 2010, Martigny-Combe had an unemployment rate of 4.8%. As of 2008, there were 93 people employed in the primary economic sector and about 27 businesses involved in this sector. 42 people were employed in the secondary sector and there were 17 businesses in this sector. 236 people were employed in the tertiary sector, with 41 businesses in this sector. There were 845 residents of the municipality who were employed in some capacity, of which females made up 40.5% of the workforce.

In 2008 the total number of full-time equivalent jobs was 289. The number of jobs in the primary sector was 49, of which 47 were in agriculture and 2 were in forestry or lumber production. The number of jobs in the secondary sector was 40 of which 9 or (22.5%) were in manufacturing and 29 (72.5%) were in construction. The number of jobs in the tertiary sector was 200. In the tertiary sector; 59 or 29.5% were in wholesale or retail sales or the repair of motor vehicles, 3 or 1.5% were in the movement and storage of goods, 62 or 31.0% were in a hotel or restaurant, 3 or 1.5% were in the information industry, 33 or 16.5% were technical professionals or scientists, 15 or 7.5% were in education and 6 or 3.0% were in health care.

In 2000, there were 80 workers who commuted into the municipality and 660 workers who commuted away. The municipality is a net exporter of workers, with about 8.3 workers leaving the municipality for every one entering. Of the working population, 10.7% used public transportation to get to work, and 74.8% used a private car.

== Religion ==
From the 2000 census, 1,410 or 81.5% were Roman Catholic, while 121 or 7.0% belonged to the Swiss Reformed Church. Of the rest of the population, there were 5 members of an Orthodox church (or about 0.29% of the population), and there were 27 individuals (or about 1.56% of the population) who belonged to another Christian church. There were 4 (or about 0.23% of the population) who were Islamic. There were 2 individuals who belonged to another church. 125 (or about 7.22% of the population) belonged to no church, are agnostic or atheist, and 50 individuals (or about 2.89% of the population) did not answer the question.

== Education ==
In Martigny-Combe about 653 or (37.7%) of the population have completed non-mandatory upper secondary education, and 205 or (11.8%) have completed additional higher education (either university or a Fachhochschule). Of the 205 who completed tertiary schooling, 54.1% were Swiss men, 30.7% were Swiss women, 8.8% were non-Swiss men and 6.3% were non-Swiss women.

As of 2000, there was one student in Martigny-Combe who came from another municipality, while 155 residents attended schools outside the municipality.

Martigny-Combe is home to the Bibliothèque communale et scolaire de Martigny-Combe library. The library has (as of 2008) 8,064 books or other media, and loaned out 9,878 items in the same year. It was open a total of 127 days with average of 12 hours per week during that year.
