= Charrat =

- Former municipality
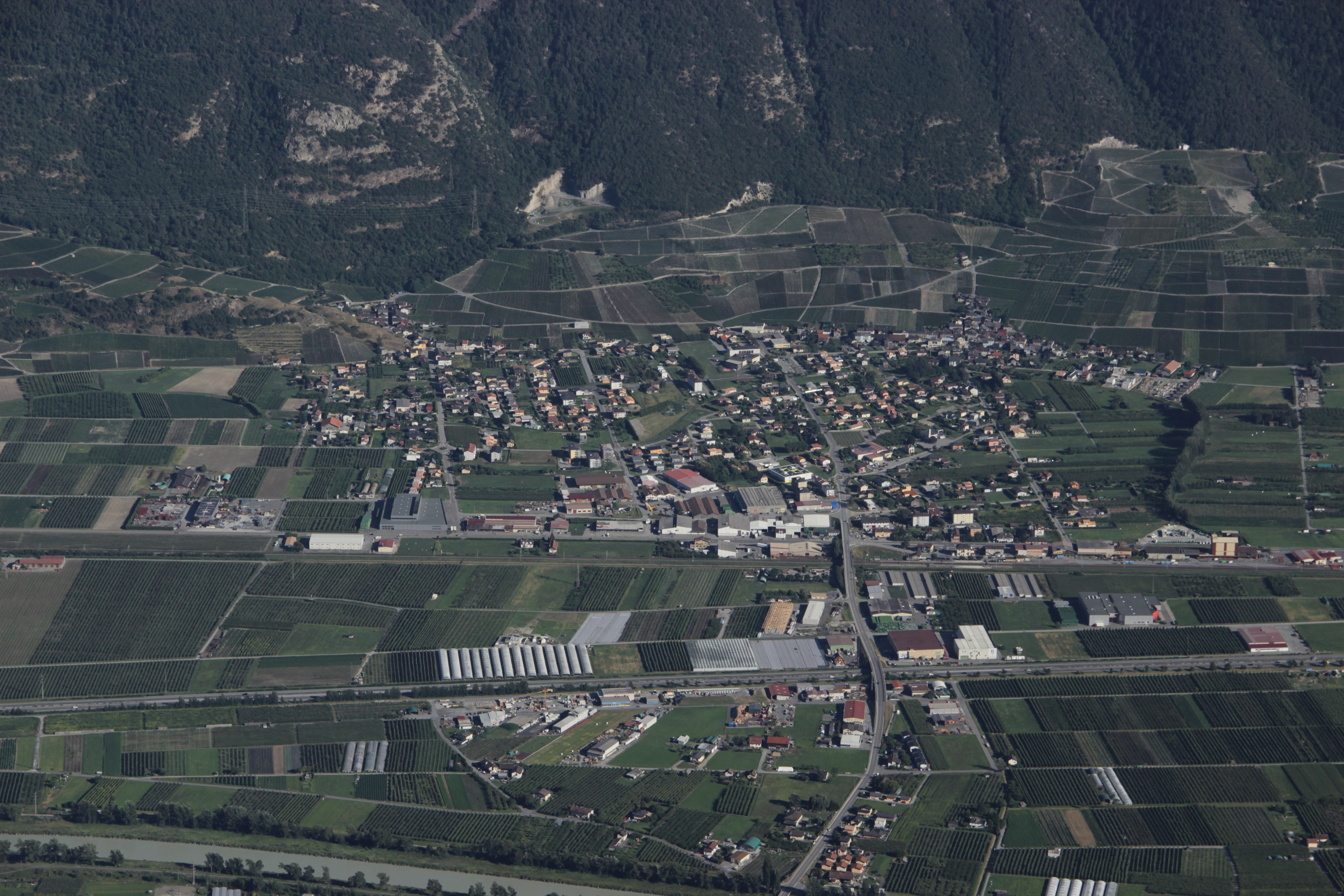

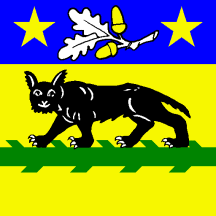
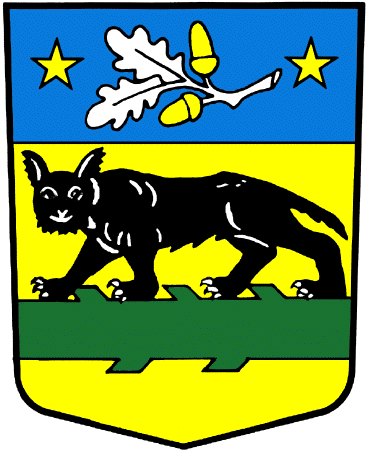
- Flag Coat of arms
- Location of Charrat
- Location within Switzerland Location within Canton of Valais
- Coordinates: 46°7′N 7°8′E
- Country: Switzerland
- Canton: Valais
- District: Martigny

Government
  - Mayor: Maurice Ducret

Area
  - Total: 7.6 km^{2} (2.9 sq mi)
- Elevation: 461 m (1,512 ft)

Population (December 2019)
  - Total: 1,913
  - Density: 250/km^{2} (650/sq mi)
- Time zone: UTC+01:00 (CET)
  - Summer (DST): UTC+02:00 (CEST)
- Postal code: 1906
- SFOS number: 6132
- ISO 3166 code: CH-VS
- Surrounded by: Fully, Martigny, Saxon, Vollèges
- Website: www.charrat.ch

Charrat is a former municipality in the district of Martigny in the canton of Valais in Switzerland. On 1 January 2021 the former municipality of Charrat merged into the municipality of Martigny.

== Geography ==
Charrat had an area, as of 2011, of 7.6 square kilometers (2.9 mi^{2}). Of this area, 45.0% is used for agricultural purposes, while 40.1% is forested. Of the rest of the land, 12.0% is settled (buildings or roads) and 2.9% is unproductive land.

The former municipality is located in the Martigny district, on the left bank of the Rhône. It consists of the villages of Vison and Les Chênes and a development around the train station.

== Coat of arms ==
The blazon of the municipal coat of arms is Or a Bar ragully Vert a Lynx passant Sable armed Argent on a Chief Azure between two Mullets of Five Or an Oak branch Argent fructed Or.

== Demographics ==
Charrat had a population (as of 2019) of 1,913. As of 2008, 26.3% of the population are resident foreign nationals. Over the last 10 years (2000–2010), the population has changed at a rate of 23.1%. It has changed at a rate of 21.2% due to migration and at a rate of 2.4% due to births and deaths.

Most of the population (as of 2000) speaks French (973 or 90.0%) as their first language, Portuguese is the second most common (30 or 2.8%) and Italian is the third (23 or 2.1%). There are 13 people who speak German.

As of 2008, the gender distribution of the population was 52.1% male and 47.9% female. The population was made up of 500 Swiss men (36.8% of the population) and 208 (15.3%) non-Swiss men. There were 484 Swiss women (35.6%) and 167 (12.3%) non-Swiss women.

Of the population in the municipality, 492 or about 45.5% were born in Charrat and lived there in 2000. There were 313 or 29.0% who were born in the same canton, while 78 or 7.2% were born somewhere else in Switzerland, and 174 or 16.1% were born outside of Switzerland. The age distribution of the population (as of 2000) is children and teenagers (0–19 years old) make up 28.2% of the population, while adults (20–64 years old) make up 55.4% and seniors (over 64 years old) make up 16.4%.

As of 2000, there were 433 people who were single and never married in the municipality. There were 545 married individuals, 70 widows or widowers and 33 individuals who are divorced.

As of 2000, there were 413 private households in the municipality, and an average of 2.6 persons per household. There were 119 households that consist of only one person and 42 households with five or more people. In 2000, a total of 410 apartments (84.9% of the total) were permanently occupied, while 49 apartments (10.1%) were seasonally occupied and 24 apartments (5.0%) were empty. As of 2009, the construction rate of new housing units was 5.2 new units per 1000 residents.

The historical population is given in the following chart:

== Politics ==
In the 2007 federal election, the most popular party was the FDP which received 34.66% of the vote. The next three most popular parties were the CVP (33.47%), the SVP (15.66%) and the SP (8.95%). In the federal election, a total of 543 votes were cast, and the voter turnout was 68.6%.

In the 2009 Conseil d'État/Staatsrat election, a total of 468 votes were cast, of which 45 or about 9.6% were invalid. The voter participation was 59.9%, which is much more than the cantonal average of 54.67%. In the 2007 Swiss Council of States election a total of 535 votes were cast, of which 45 or about 8.4% were invalid. The voter participation was 68.7%, which is much more than the cantonal average of 59.88%.

== Economy ==
As of 2010, Charrat had an unemployment rate of 6.1%. As of 2008, there were 89 people employed in the primary economic sector and about 27 businesses involved in this sector. 177 people were employed in the secondary sector and there were 18 businesses in this sector. 290 people were employed in the tertiary sector, with 43 businesses in this sector. There were 513 residents of the municipality who were employed in some capacity, of which females made up 41.1% of the workforce.

In 2008, the total number of full-time equivalent jobs was 486. The number of jobs in the primary sector was 59, all of which were in agriculture. The number of jobs in the secondary sector was 168 of which 101 or (60.1%) were in manufacturing and 67 (39.9%) were in construction. The number of jobs in the tertiary sector was 259. In the tertiary sector; 198 or 76.4% were in wholesale or retail sales or the repair of motor vehicles, 24 or 9.3% were in the movement and storage of goods, 12 or 4.6% were in a hotel or restaurant, 1 was the insurance or financial industry, 2 or 0.8% were technical professionals or scientists, 8 or 3.1% were in education.

In 2000, there were 280 workers who commuted into the municipality and 343 workers who commuted away. The municipality is a net exporter of workers, with about 1.2 workers leaving the municipality for every one entering. Of the working population, 9.4% used public transportation to get to work, and 70.4% used a private car.

== Religion ==
From the 2000 census, 876 or 81.0% were Roman Catholic, while 54 or 5.0% belonged to the Swiss Reformed Church. Of the rest of the population, there were 15 members of an Orthodox church (or about 1.39% of the population), and there were 32 individuals (or about 2.96% of the population) who belonged to another Christian church. There were 29 (or about 2.68% of the population) who were Islamic. There was 1 person who was Hindu and 3 individuals who belonged to another church. 44 (or about 4.07% of the population) belonged to no church, are agnostic or atheist, and 43 individuals (or about 3.98% of the population) did not answer the question.

== Education ==
In Charrat, about 353 or (32.7%) of the population have completed non-mandatory upper secondary education, and 67 or (6.2%) have completed additional higher education (either university or a Fachhochschule). Of the 67 who completed tertiary schooling, 55.2% were Swiss men, 28.4% were Swiss women, 9.0% were non-Swiss men and 7.5% were non-Swiss women.

As of 2000, there was one student in Charrat who came from another municipality, while 79 residents attended schools outside the municipality.

Charrat is home to the Bibliothèque communale et scolaire library. The library has (as of 2008) 6,622 books or other media, and loaned out 6,392 items in the same year. It was open a total of 180 days with average of 9 hours per week during that year.
