= Fully =

- Municipality
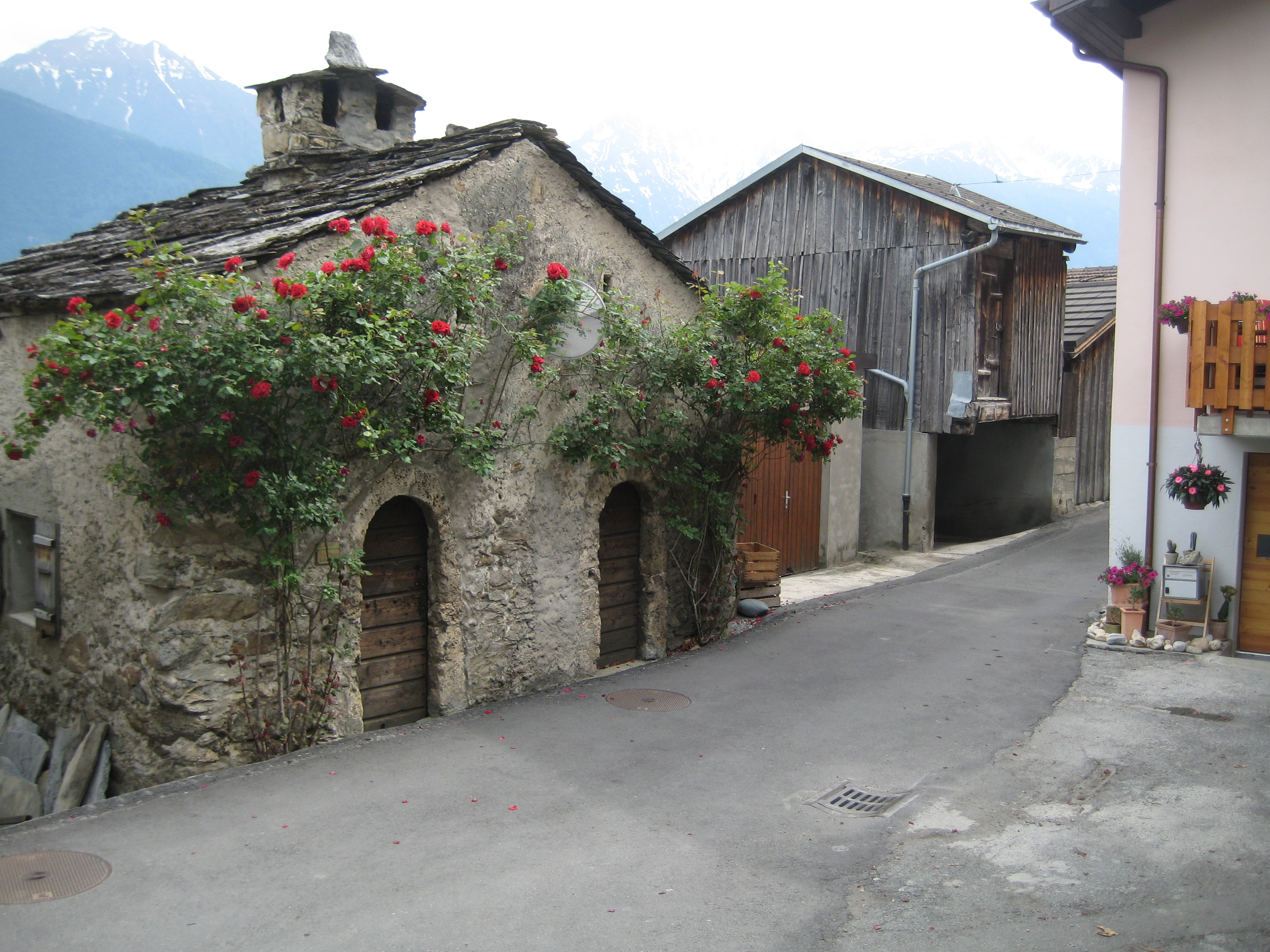
- Houses in Branson village

- Flag Coat of arms
- Location of Fully
- Location within Switzerland Location within Canton of Valais
- Coordinates: 46°8′N 7°7′E
- Country: Switzerland
- Canton: Valais
- District: Martigny

Government
  - Mayor: Caroline Ançay-Roduit

Area
  - Total: 37.79 km^{2} (14.59 sq mi)
- Elevation: 461 m (1,512 ft)

Population (2007)
  - Total: 6,474
  - Density: 171.3/km^{2} (443.7/sq mi)
- Demonym(s): fulliérain, fulliéraine
- Time zone: UTC+01:00 (CET)
  - Summer (DST): UTC+02:00 (CEST)
- Postal code: 1926
- SFOS number: 6133
- ISO 3166 code: CH-VS
- Localities: Branson, Châtaignier, Mazembroz, Saxé
- Surrounded by: Bex (VD), Charrat, Collonges, Dorénaz, Leytron, Martigny, Saillon, Saxon.
- Website: www.fully.ch

Fully (French pronunciation: [fyji]) is a municipality in the district of Martigny in the canton of Valais in Switzerland.

== History ==
Fully is first mentioned in the 11th Century as Fuliacum.

== Geography ==
Aerial view (1949)

Fully has an area, as of 2011, of 37.8 square kilometers (14.6 mi^{2}). Of this area, 30.5% is used for agricultural purposes, while 27.7% is forested. Of the rest of the land, 5.7% is settled (buildings or roads) and 36.2% is unproductive land.

It is on the right bank of the river Rhône and is well known for its wines. Fully is just the administrative name of a group of several villages of Vers-l'Eglise (sometimes called Fully), Branson, Châtaignier and Randonnaz along with a number of hamlets.

The natural reserve of Les Follatères (shared between Fully and Dorénaz), located on the south facing slopes above the Rhône elbow, has a variety of animal and plant species normally uncommon in Switzerland.

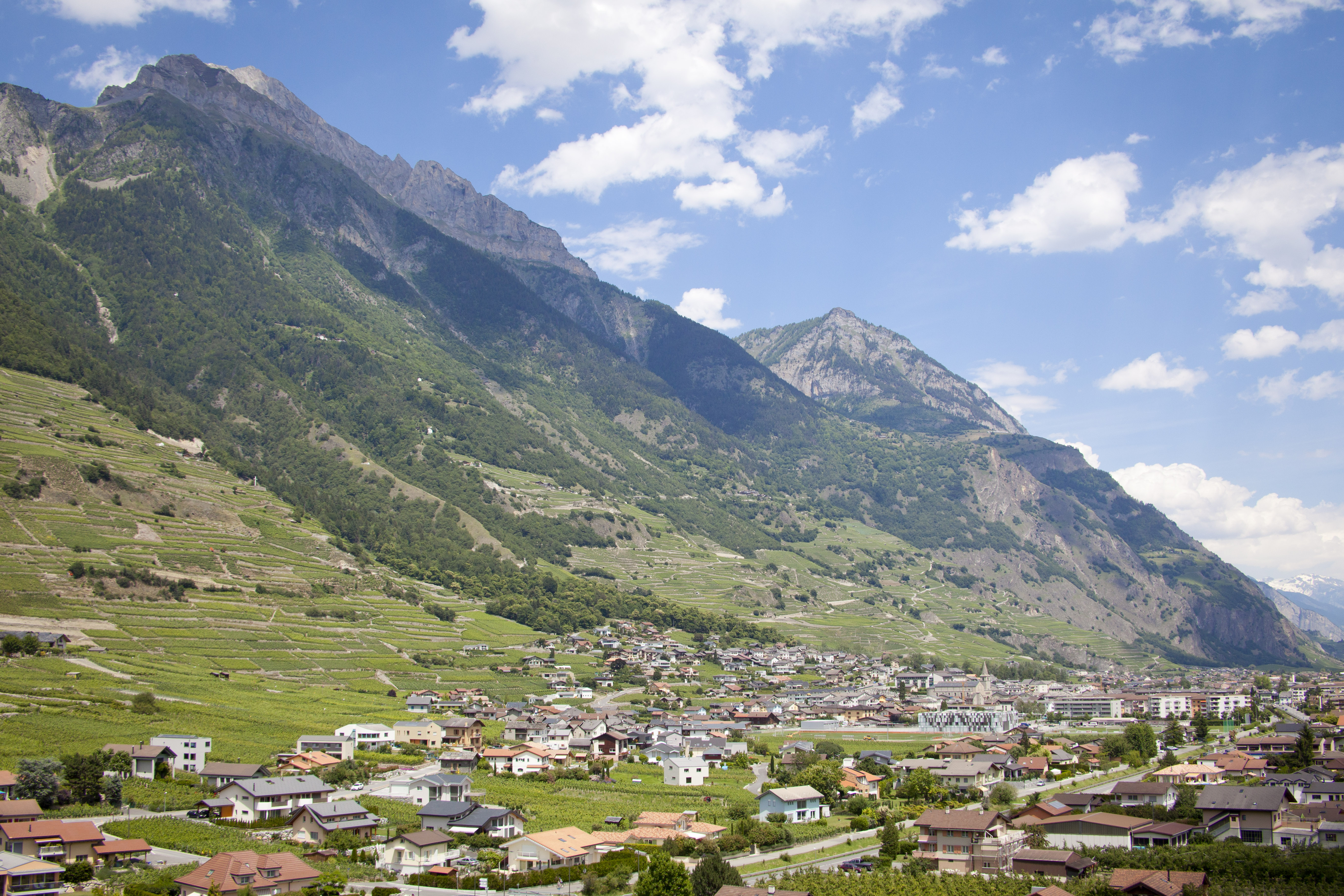
Fully at the foot of the Grand Chavalard

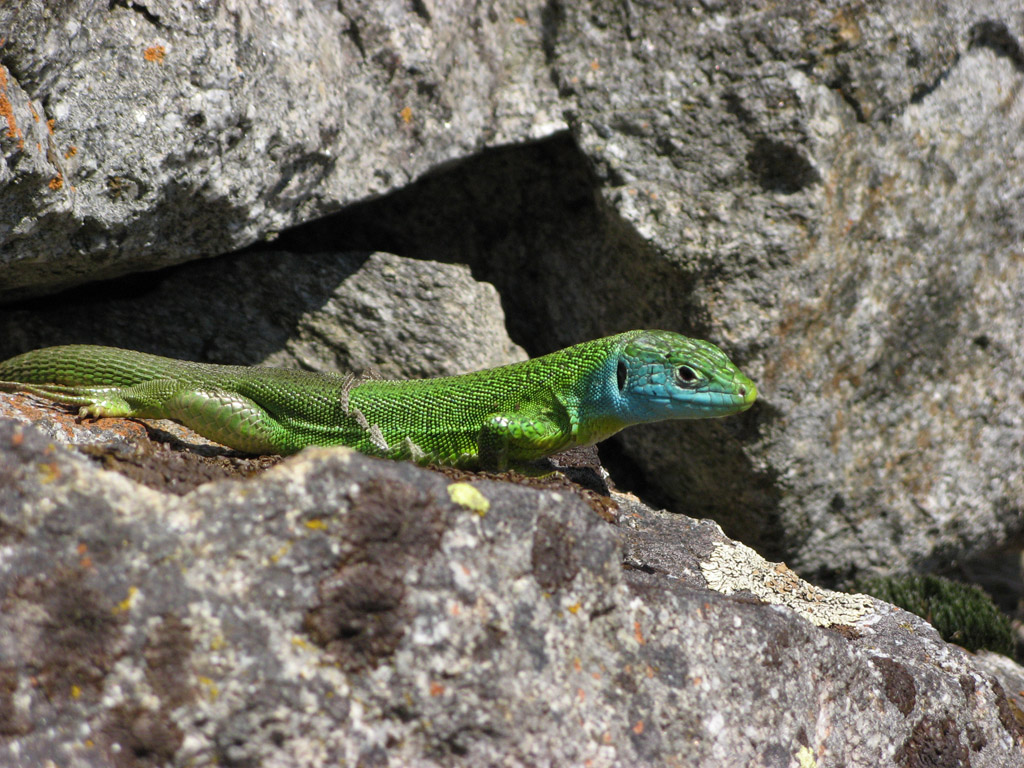
Green lizard

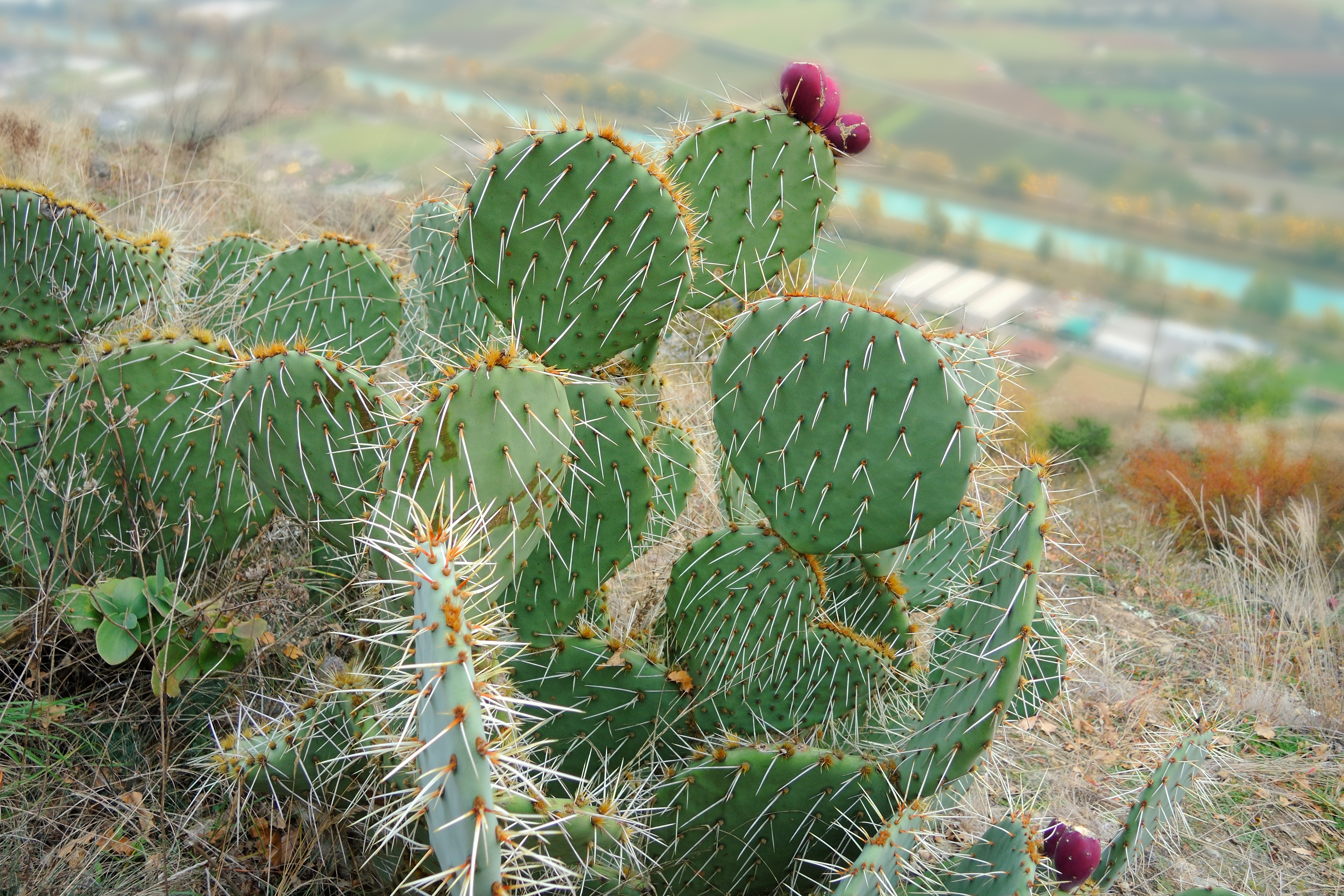
Cactuses (Opuntia)

== Coat of arms ==
The blazon of the municipal coat of arms is Per fess, Gules two Grapes Or slipped Vert and Azure a Church Or doored and roofed Sable.

== Demographics ==
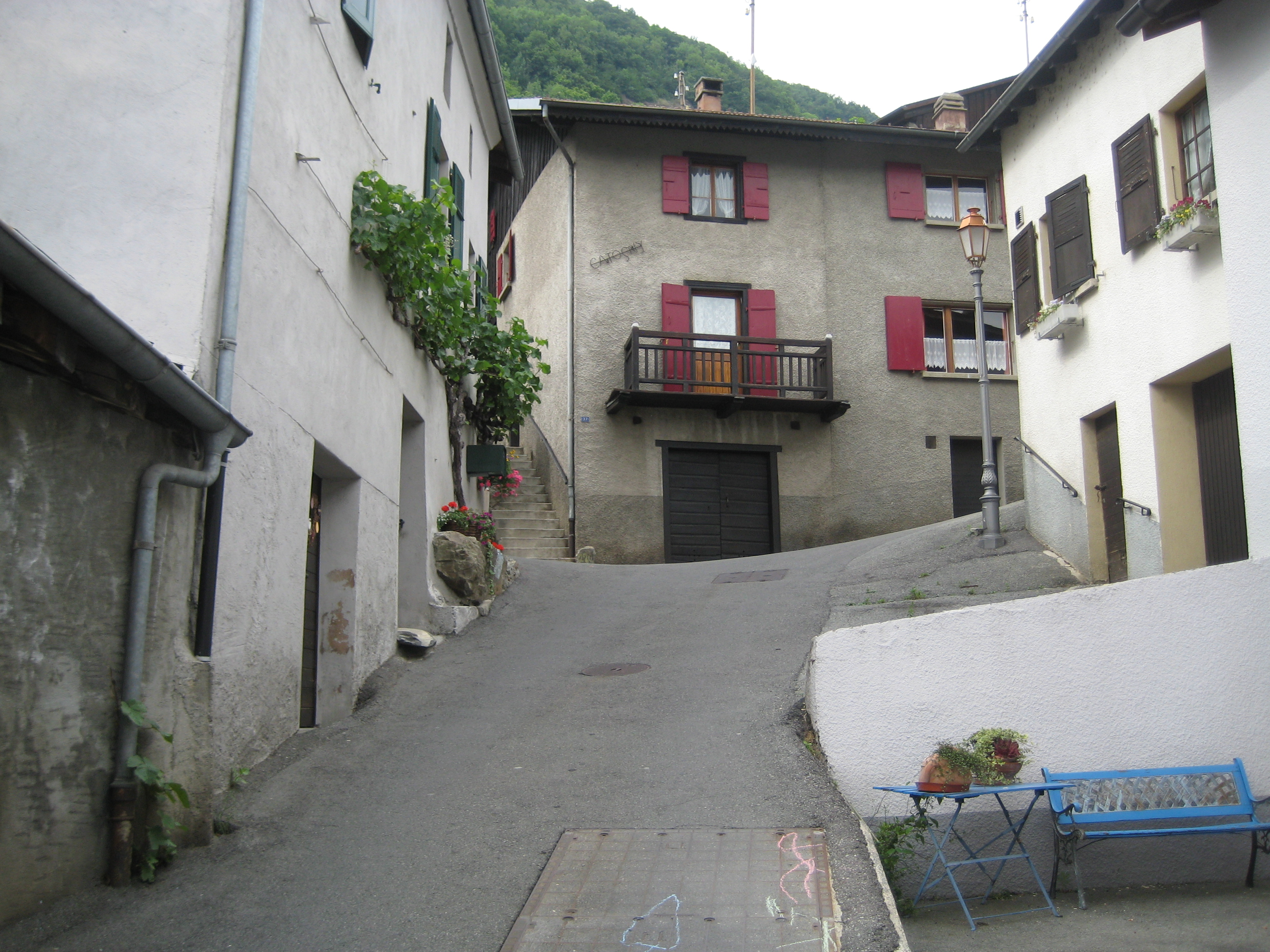
Houses in Fully

Fully has a population (as of December 2020) of 8,793. As of 2008, 18.4% of the population are resident foreign nationals. Over the last 10 years (2000–2010) the population has changed at a rate of 28.8%. It has changed at a rate of 21.5% due to migration and at a rate of 5.3% due to births and deaths.

Most of the population (as of 2000) speaks French (5,134 or 91.9%) as their first language, Portuguese is the second most common (195 or 3.5%) and Albanian is the third (82 or 1.5%). There are 52 people who speak German, 47 people who speak Italian and 4 people who speak Romansh.

As of 2008, the gender distribution of the population was 49.3% male and 50.7% female. The population was made up of 2,909 Swiss men (39.3% of the population) and 741 (10.0%) non-Swiss men. There were 3,145 Swiss women (42.4%) and 616 (8.3%) non-Swiss women. Of the population in the municipality 3,207 or about 57.4% were born in Fully and lived there in 2000. There were 1,043 or 18.7% who were born in the same canton, while 412 or 7.4% were born somewhere else in Switzerland, and 798 or 14.3% were born outside of Switzerland.

The age distribution of the population (as of 2000) is children and teenagers (0–19 years old) make up 29.7% of the population, while adults (20–64 years old) make up 56.5% and seniors (over 64 years old) make up 13.8%. As of 2000, there were 2,372 people who were single and never married in the municipality. There were 2,716 married individuals, 342 widows or widowers and 157 individuals who are divorced.

As of 2000, there were 2,093 private households in the municipality, and an average of 2.6 persons per household. There were 610 households that consist of only one person and 262 households with five or more people. In 2000, a total of 1,979 apartments (80.1% of the total) were permanently occupied, while 384 apartments (15.5%) were seasonally occupied and 107 apartments (4.3%) were empty. As of 2009, the construction rate of new housing units was 12.8 new units per 1000 residents. The vacancy rate for the municipality, in 2010, was 0.73%.

The historical population is given in the following chart:

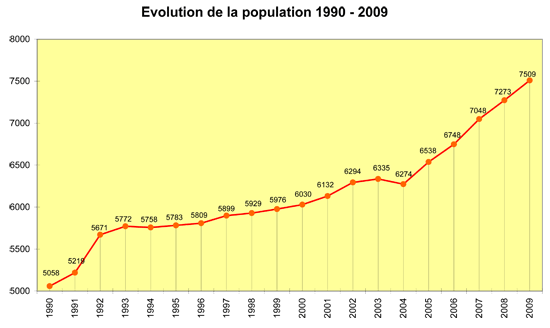
Population growth, 1990-2009

== Sights ==
The entire hamlet of Branson is designated as part of the Inventory of Swiss Heritage Sites.

== Politics ==
In the 2007 federal election the most popular party was the CVP which received 36.45% of the vote. The next three most popular parties were the FDP (23.67%), the SVP (16.95%) and the SP (12%). In the federal election, a total of 2,733 votes were cast, and the voter turnout was 63.0%.

In the 2009 Conseil d'État/Staatsrat election a total of 2,656 votes were cast, of which 154 or about 5.8% were invalid. The voter participation was 59.3%, which is similar to the cantonal average of 54.67%. In the 2007 Swiss Council of States election a total of 2,716 votes were cast, of which 211 or about 7.8% were invalid. The voter participation was 63.2%, which is similar to the cantonal average of 59.88%.

== Economy ==
As of 2010, Fully had an unemployment rate of 5.9%. As of 2008, there were 741 people employed in the primary economic sector and about 200 businesses involved in this sector. 366 people were employed in the secondary sector and there were 54 businesses in this sector. 812 people were employed in the tertiary sector, with 150 businesses in this sector. There were 2,695 residents of the municipality who were employed in some capacity, of which females made up 42.2% of the workforce.

In 2008 the total number of full-time equivalent jobs was 1,400. The number of jobs in the primary sector was 431, of which 427 were in agriculture and 4 were in forestry or lumber production. The number of jobs in the secondary sector was 341 of which 53 or (15.5%) were in manufacturing and 288 (84.5%) were in construction. The number of jobs in the tertiary sector was 628. In the tertiary sector; 232 or 36.9% were in wholesale or retail sales or the repair of motor vehicles, 37 or 5.9% were in the movement and storage of goods, 73 or 11.6% were in a hotel or restaurant, 5 or 0.8% were in the information industry, 24 or 3.8% were the insurance or financial industry, 49 or 7.8% were technical professionals or scientists, 42 or 6.7% were in education and 89 or 14.2% were in health care.

In 2000, there were 279 workers who commuted into the municipality and 1,548 workers who commuted away. The municipality is a net exporter of workers, with about 5.5 workers leaving the municipality for every one entering. Of the working population, 9.5% used public transportation to get to work, and 71.4% used a private car.

== Religion ==
From the 2000 census, 4,765 or 85.3% were Roman Catholic, while 205 or 3.7% belonged to the Swiss Reformed Church. Of the rest of the population, there were 29 members of an Orthodox church (or about 0.52% of the population), there was 1 individual who belongs to the Christian Catholic Church, and there were 50 individuals (or about 0.89% of the population) who belonged to another Christian church. There were 168 (or about 3.01% of the population) who were Islamic. There were 2 individuals who were Buddhist, 2 individuals who were Hindu and 6 individuals who belonged to another church. 168 (or about 3.01% of the population) belonged to no church, are agnostic or atheist, and 213 individuals (or about 3.81% of the population) did not answer the question.

== Education ==
In Fully about 1,628 or (29.1%) of the population have completed non-mandatory upper secondary education, and 492 or (8.8%) have completed additional higher education (either university or a Fachhochschule). Of the 492 who completed tertiary schooling, 58.3% were Swiss men, 31.5% were Swiss women, 5.9% were non-Swiss men and 4.3% were non-Swiss women.

As of 2000, there were 8 students in Fully who came from another municipality, while 470 residents attended schools outside the municipality.
