= Saint Christophe Formation =

Geologic formation in France and Switzerland

Couches de Saint Christophe
- Stratigraphic range: Late Cretaceous-Paleogene
- Type: Geological formation
- Unit of: Valais trilogy
- Overlies: Couches des Marmontains
- Thickness: Averaging 500 m (1,600 ft)

Lithology
- Primary: Schist
- Other: Calcitic sandstone

Location
- Coordinates: 45.696144°N 6.734438°E
- Region: Savoie
- Country: France, Switzerland

Type section
- Named for: Chapel St. Christophe, Verbier

The Couches de Saint Christophe are a sedimentary formation deposited between the Late Cretaceous and the Paleogene. It is a very monotonous sequence of calcitic sandstones and black schists. These are interpreted as a turbidite sequence. The average thickness of the unit is 500 m. The Couches de Saint Christophe are a post-rift sequence that overlies the Couches des Marmontains.

The Couches de Saint Christophe occupy the following nappes:

- External Valais

- Moûtiers unit
- Roc de l'Enfer unit
- Petit St. Bernard unit

- Internal Valais

- Versoyen unit

Large outcrops of the Couches de Saint Christophe crop out north of Bourg-Saint-Maurice.

The type locality of the formation is the Val de Bagnes in the canton Valais of Switzerland. It was first described by Rudolf Trümpy in 1952. The formation is named after a chapel (46.094905°N 7.200371°E) to the northwest of Verbier.

The Saint Christophe Formation can be correlated with the Sassauna Formation found in Graubünden and calcareous flysch found in the Engadine.
