= Pierre Avoi =

Mountain in Switzerland

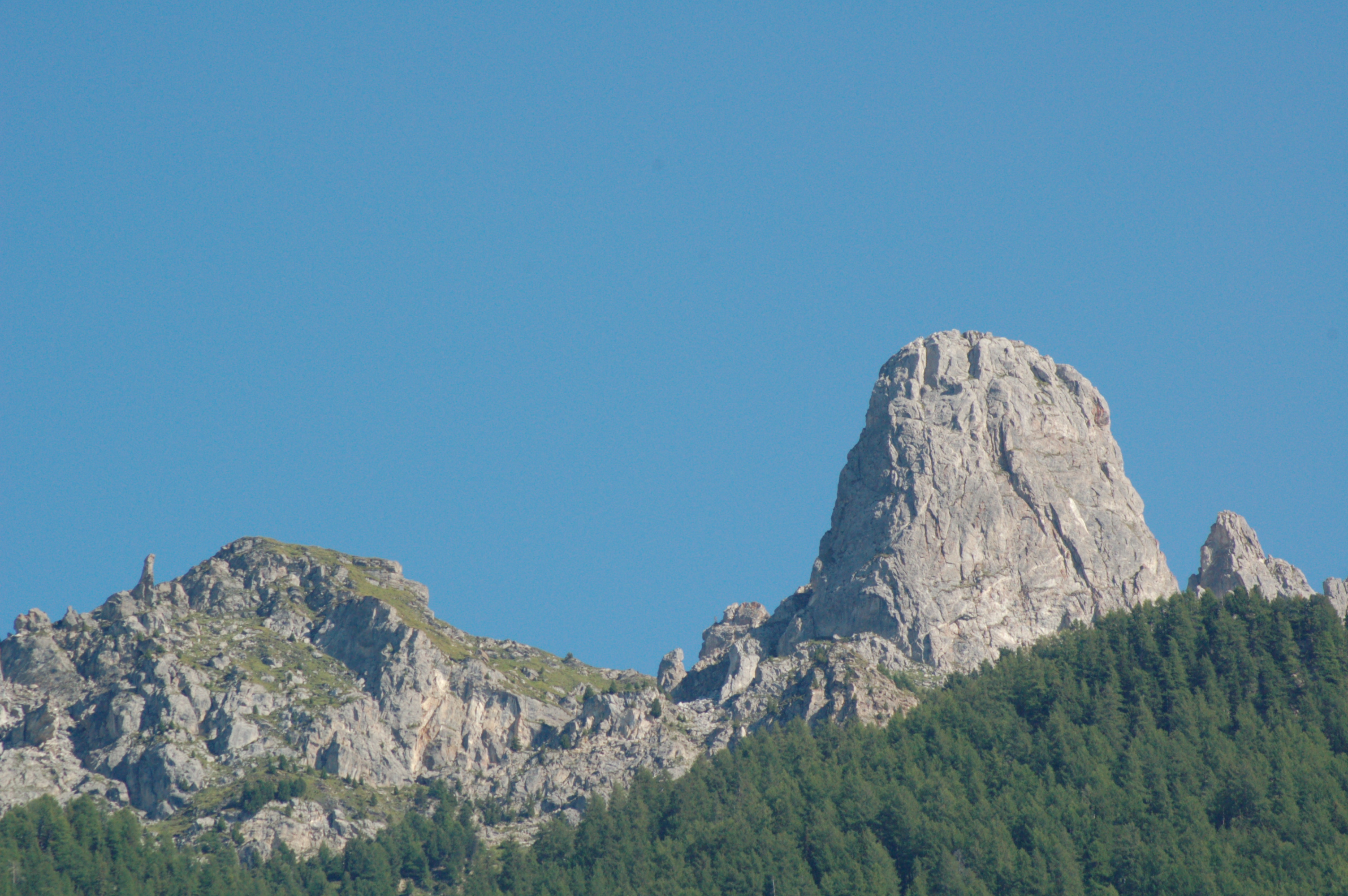

Highest point
- Elevation: 2,473 m (8,114 ft)
- Prominence: 300 m (980 ft)
- Coordinates: 46°7′5.2″N 7°12′0.5″E

Geography
- Location within Switzerland
- Location: Valais, Switzerland
- Parent range: Pennine Alps

The Pierre Avoi is a mountain of the Swiss Pennine Alps, overlooking Saxon in the canton of Valais. It is located on the chain between the main Rhone valley and the valley of Bagnes.

The closest locality is Verbier, from where several trails lead to the summit of Pierre Avoi.
