= Isérables =

- Municipality
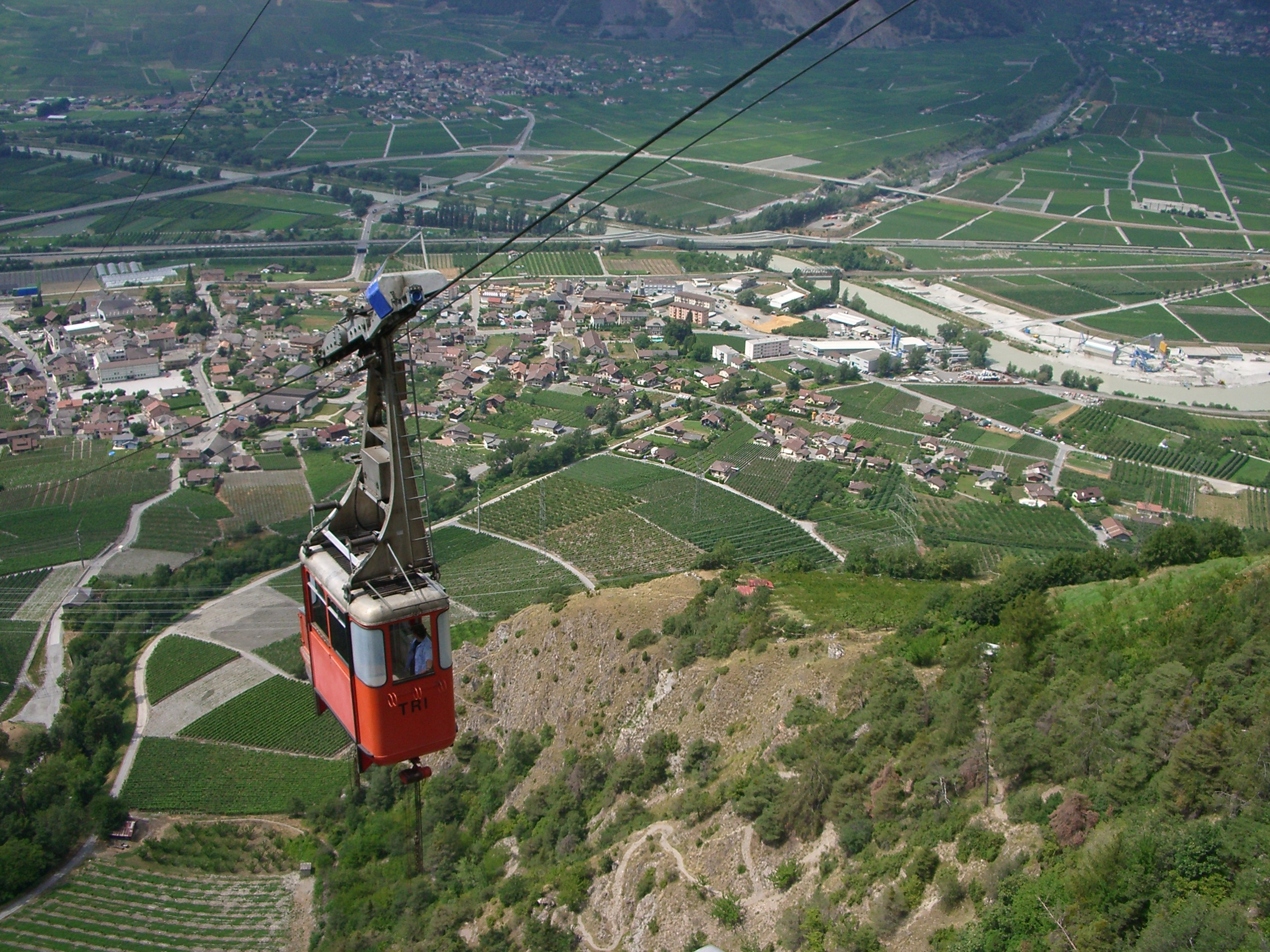

- Flag Coat of arms
- Location of Isérables
- Location within Switzerland Location within Canton of Valais
- Coordinates: 46°9.868′N 7°14.603′E
- Country: Switzerland
- Canton: Valais
- District: Martigny

Government
  - Mayor: Régis Monnet

Area
  - Total: 15.2 km^{2} (5.9 sq mi)
- Elevation: 1,106 m (3,629 ft)

Population (December 2003)
  - Total: 982
  - Density: 64.6/km^{2} (167/sq mi)
- Time zone: UTC+01:00 (CET)
  - Summer (DST): UTC+02:00 (CEST)
- Postal code: 1914
- SFOS number: 6134
- ISO 3166 code: CH-VS
- Surrounded by: Nendaz, Riddes
- Website: www.iserables.ch

Isérables is a municipality in the district of Martigny in the canton of Valais in Switzerland.

== History ==
Isérables is first mentioned in 1227 as Aserablos. In 1324 it was mentioned as Yserablo.

== Geography ==
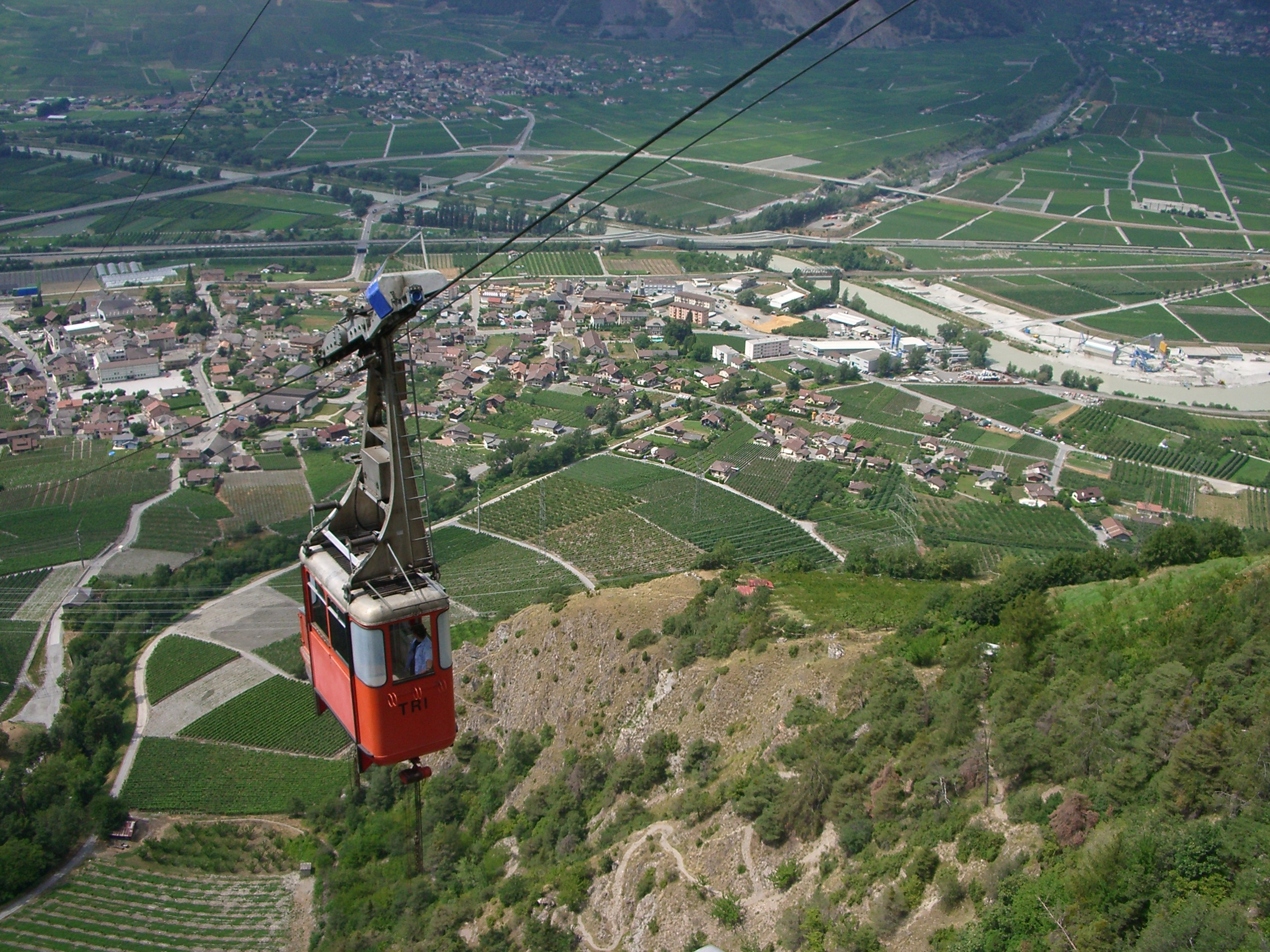
Cable car from Riddes up to Isérables

Aerial view (1949)

Isérables has an area, as of 2011, of 15.3 square kilometers (5.9 mi^{2}). Of this area, 22.1% is used for agricultural purposes, while 50.4% is forested. Of the rest of the land, 2.7% is settled (buildings or roads) and 24.8% is unproductive land.

The municipality is located in the Martigny district, in the mountains above Riddes and the left bank of the Rhône.

== Coat of arms ==
The blazon of the municipal coat of arms is Per bend Azure and Or overall a Maple leaf Vert in base Coupeaux of the same. The maple (French: érable) leaf is an example of canting.

== Demographics ==
Isérables has a population (as of December 2020) of 827. As of 2008, 2.2% of the population are resident foreign nationals. Over the last 10 years (2000–2010 ) the population has changed at a rate of -5.7%. It has changed at a rate of -1.6% due to migration and at a rate of -3.5% due to births and deaths.

Most of the population (as of 2000) speaks French (912 or 99.8%) as their first language with the rest speaking German.

As of 2008, the gender distribution of the population was 50.2% male and 49.8% female. The population was made up of 432 Swiss men (48.4% of the population) and 16 (1.8%) non-Swiss men. There were 434 Swiss women (48.7%) and 10 (1.1%) non-Swiss women. Of the population in the municipality 771 or about 84.4% were born in Isérables and lived there in 2000. There were 65 or 7.1% who were born in the same canton, while 21 or 2.3% were born somewhere else in Switzerland, and 19 or 2.1% were born outside of Switzerland.

The age distribution of the population (as of 2000) is children and teenagers (0–19 years old) make up 21.9% of the population, while adults (20–64 years old) make up 60% and seniors (over 64 years old) make up 18.2%.

As of 2000, there were 365 people who were single and never married in the municipality. There were 436 married individuals, 90 widows or widowers and 23 individuals who are divorced.

As of 2000, there were 371 private households in the municipality, and an average of 2.4 persons per household. There were 114 households that consist of only one person and 36 households with five or more people. In 2000, a total of 350 apartments (74.0% of the total) were permanently occupied, while 94 apartments (19.9%) were seasonally occupied and 29 apartments (6.1%) were empty. As of 2009, the construction rate of new housing units was 6.7 new units per 1000 residents. The vacancy rate for the municipality, in 2010, was 2.05%.

The historical population is given in the following chart:

== Sights ==
The entire village of Isérables is designated as part of the Inventory of Swiss Heritage Sites.

== Politics ==
In the 2007 federal election the FDP received 32.92% of the vote. Most of the rest of the votes went to the CVP with 30.69% of the vote. In the federal election, a total of 543 votes were cast, and the voter turnout was 68.6%.

In the 2009 Conseil d'État/Staatsrat election a total of 461 votes were cast, of which 25 or about 5.4% were invalid. The voter participation was 63.2%, which is much more than the cantonal average of 54.67%. In the 2007 Swiss Council of States election a total of 524 votes were cast, of which 25 or about 4.8% were invalid. The voter participation was 70.9%, which is much more than the cantonal average of 59.88%.

== Economy ==
As of 2010, Isérables had an unemployment rate of 4.7%. As of 2008, there were 89 people employed in the primary economic sector and about 38 businesses involved in this sector. 69 people were employed in the secondary sector and there were 9 businesses in this sector. 70 people were employed in the tertiary sector, with 21 businesses in this sector. There were 462 residents of the municipality who were employed in some capacity, of which females made up 38.7% of the workforce.

In 2008 the total number of full-time equivalent jobs was 159. The number of jobs in the primary sector was 39, all of which were in agriculture. The number of jobs in the secondary sector was 65 of which 37 or (56.9%) were in manufacturing and 28 (43.1%) were in construction. The number of jobs in the tertiary sector was 55. In the tertiary sector; 9 or 16.4% were in wholesale or retail sales or the repair of motor vehicles, 23 or 41.8% were in the movement and storage of goods, 10 or 18.2% were in a hotel or restaurant, 3 or 5.5% were the insurance or financial industry, 2 or 3.6% were technical professionals or scientists, 5 or 9.1% were in education.

In 2000, there were 61 workers who commuted into the municipality and 267 workers who commuted away. The municipality is a net exporter of workers, with about 4.4 workers leaving the municipality for every one entering. Of the working population, 7.8% used public transportation to get to work, and 58.7% used a private car.

== Religion ==
From the 2000 census, 857 or 93.8% were Roman Catholic, while 7 or 0.8% belonged to the Swiss Reformed Church. Of the rest of the population, there was 1 individual who belongs to another Christian church. There was 1 individual who was Islamic. There was 1 person who was Buddhist. 18 (or about 1.97% of the population) belonged to no church, are agnostic or atheist, and 29 individuals (or about 3.17% of the population) did not answer the question.

== Education ==
In Isérables about 223 or (24.4%) of the population have completed non-mandatory upper secondary education, and 23 or (2.5%) have completed additional higher education (either university or a Fachhochschule). Of the 23 who completed tertiary schooling, 65.2% were Swiss men, 34.8% were Swiss women.

As of 2000, there were 54 students from Isérables who attended schools outside the municipality.
