= Riddes =

- Municipality
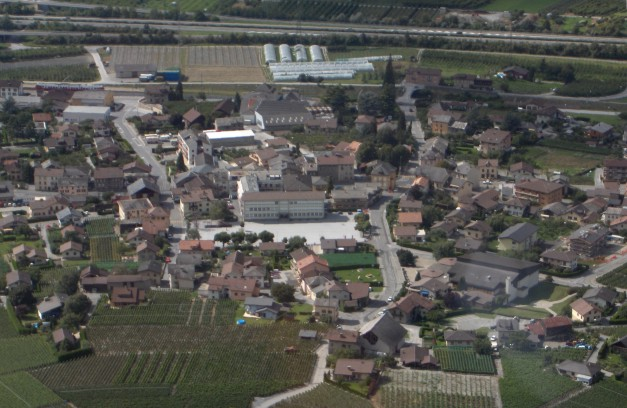

- Flag Coat of arms
- Location of Riddes
- Location within Switzerland Location within Canton of Valais
- Coordinates: 46°10′N 7°13′E
- Country: Switzerland
- Canton: Valais
- District: Martigny

Government
  - Mayor: Jean-Michel Gaillard

Area
  - Total: 23.9 km^{2} (9.2 sq mi)
- Elevation: 482 m (1,581 ft)

Population (December 2002)
  - Total: 2,179
  - Density: 91.2/km^{2} (236/sq mi)
- Time zone: UTC+01:00 (CET)
  - Summer (DST): UTC+02:00 (CEST)
- Postal code: 1908
- SFOS number: 6139
- ISO 3166 code: CH-VS
- Surrounded by: Bagnes, Chamoson, Isérables, Leytron, Nendaz, Saillon, Saxon
- Website: www.riddes.ch

Riddes is a municipality in the district of Martigny in the canton of Valais in Switzerland.

== History ==
Riddes is first mentioned in 1001 as Ride. It was previously known its German name Riden, though that is not used any more.

== Geography ==
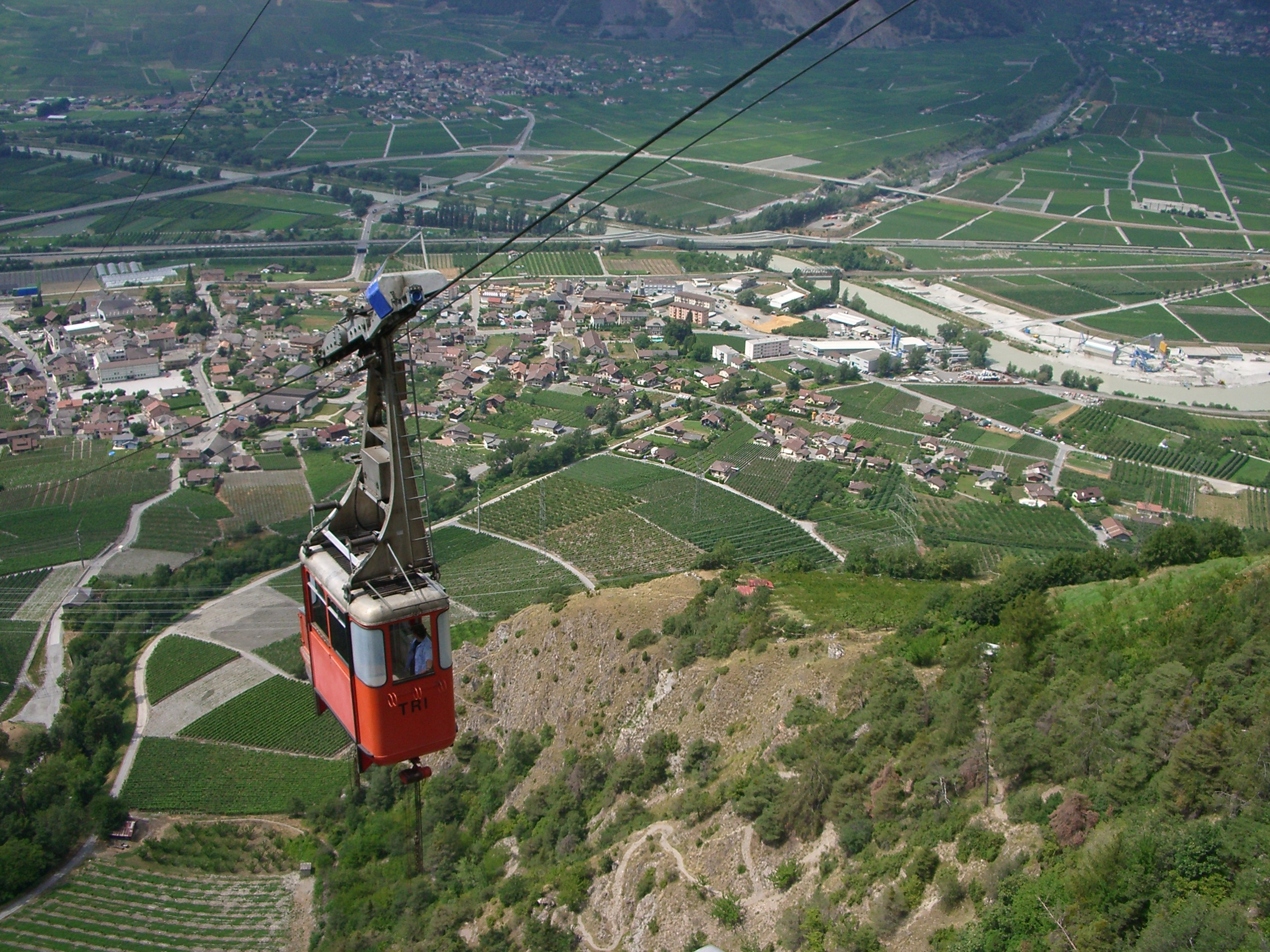
Cable car to Isérables, Riddes is in the background

Aerial view (1949)

Riddes has an area, as of 2011, of 23.9 square kilometers (9.2 mi^{2}). Of this area, 37.4% is used for agricultural purposes, while 37.1% is forested. Of the rest of the land, 9.1% is settled (buildings or roads) and 16.4% is unproductive land.

The municipality is located in the Martigny district, on the left bank of the Rhone. It consists of the village of Riddes, the hamlet of Auddes, and the vacation resorts of La Tzoumaz in Mayens-de-Riddes and Écône.

== Coat of arms ==
The blazon of the municipal coat of arms is Trierced per pale wavy Azure a wheat ear Or in chief two Mullets of Five Argent, Argent a bridge masoned towered Sable and Gules a Grille Or.

== Demographics ==
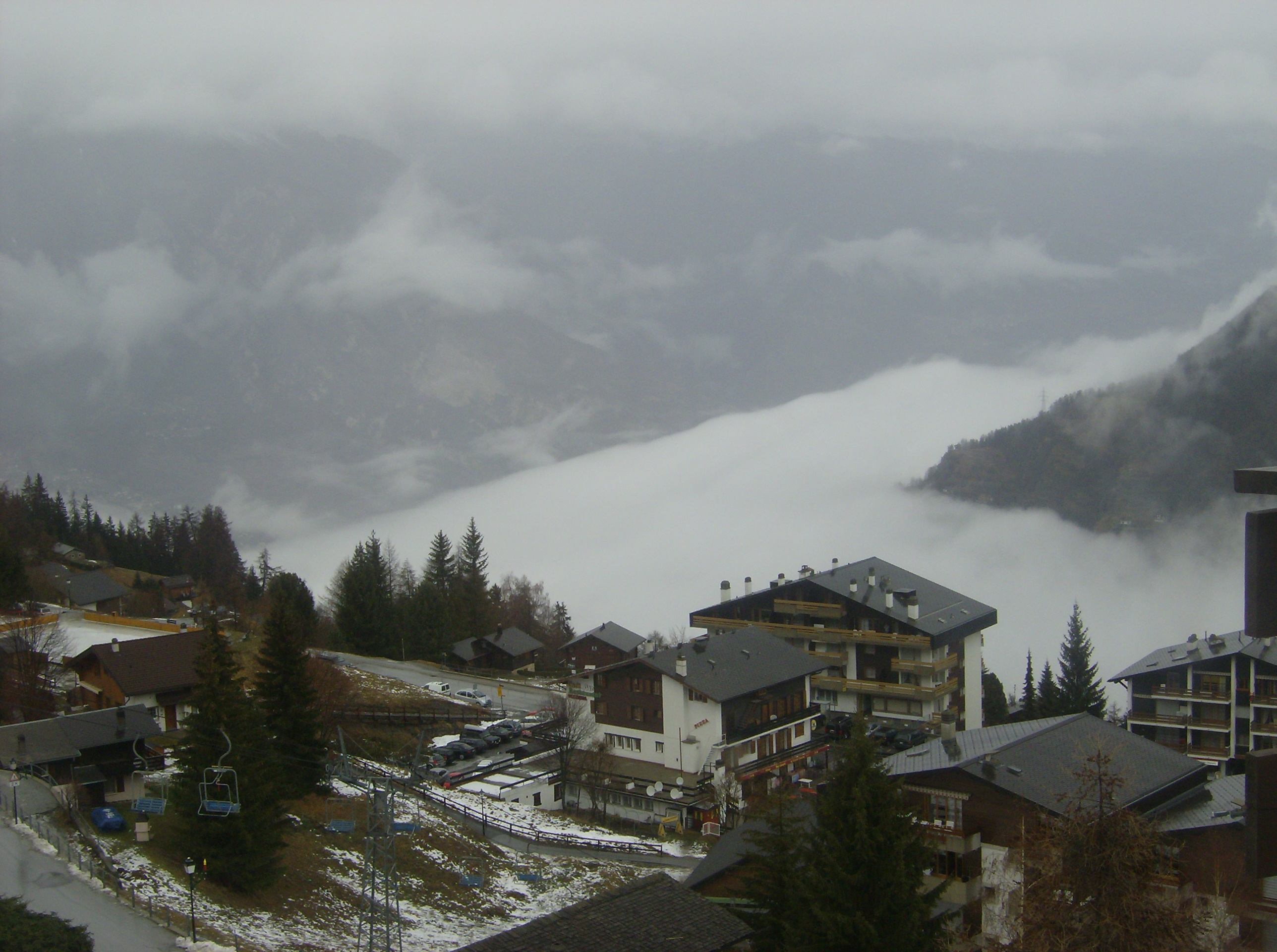
Houses above the Rhone valley

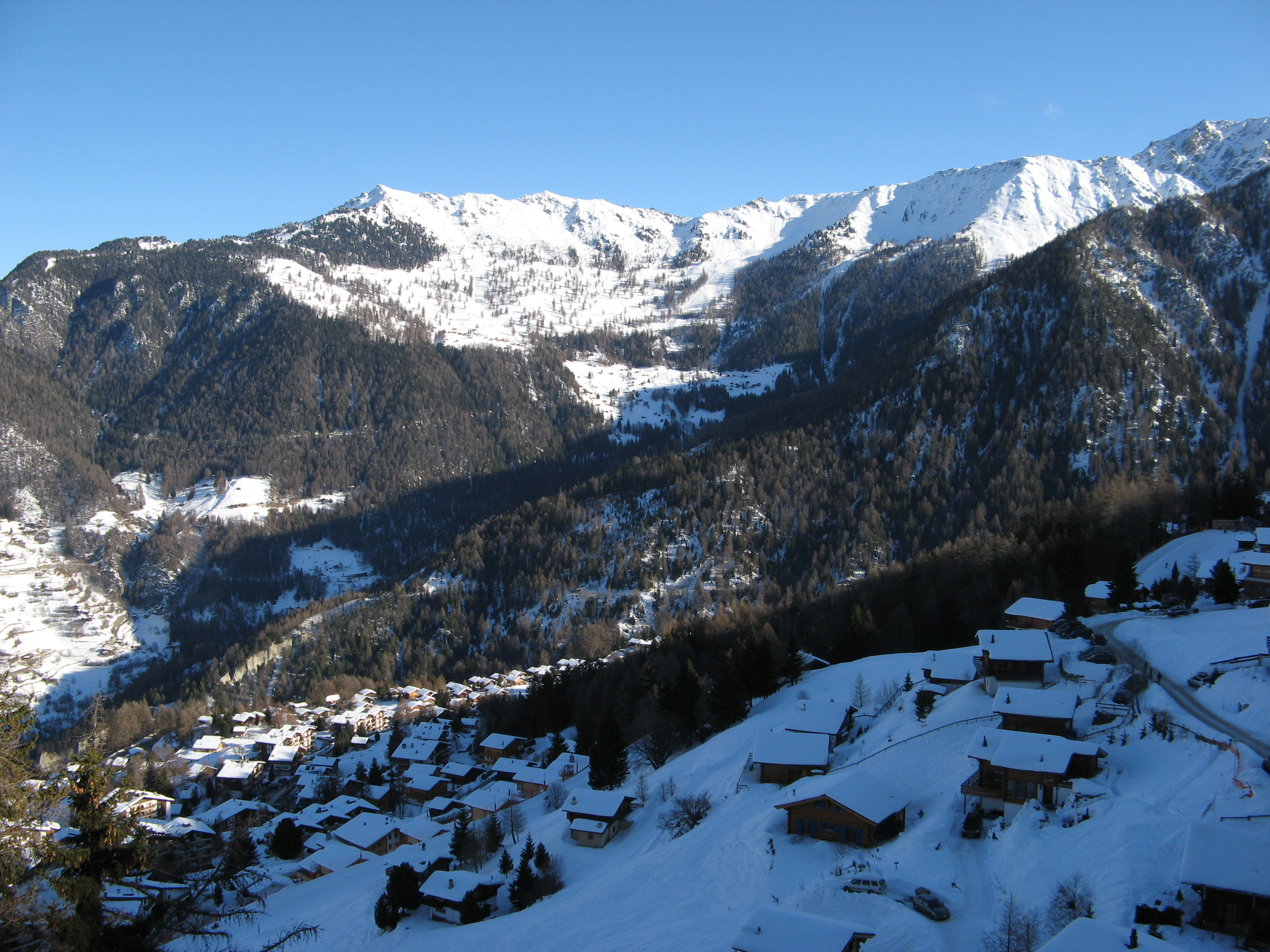
Mayen-de-Riddes resort town

Riddes has a population (as of December 2020) of 3,277. As of 2008, 24.0% of the population are resident foreign nationals. Over the last 10 years (2000–2010) the population has changed at a rate of 25.4%. It has changed at a rate of 18.1% due to migration and at a rate of 1.5% due to births and deaths.

Most of the population (as of 2000) speaks French (1,945 or 88.5%) as their first language, Portuguese is the second most common (106 or 4.8%) and German is the third (72 or 3.3%). There are 33 people who speak Italian and 2 people who speak Romansh.

As of 2008, the population was 51.6% male and 48.4% female. The population was made up of 983 Swiss men (37.2% of the population) and 380 (14.4%) non-Swiss men. There were 1,007 Swiss women (38.1%) and 273 (10.3%) non-Swiss women.

Of the population in the municipality, 925 or about 42.1% were born in Riddes and lived there in 2000. There were 654 or 29.8% who were born in the same canton, while 178 or 8.1% were born somewhere else in Switzerland, and 354 or 16.1% were born outside of Switzerland.

As of 2000, children and teenagers (0–19 years old) make up 22.3% of the population, while adults (20–64 years old) make up 61.1% and seniors (over 64 years old) make up 16.6%. As of 2000, there were 912 people who were single and never married in the municipality. There were 1,007 married individuals, 166 widows or widowers and 112 individuals who are divorced.

As of 2000, there were 831 private households in the municipality, and an average of 2.4 persons per household. There were 256 households that consist of only one person and 66 households with five or more people. In 2000, a total of 817 apartments (49.3% of the total) were permanently occupied, while 721 apartments (43.5%) were seasonally occupied and 118 apartments (7.1%) were empty. As of 2009, the construction rate of new housing units was 3 new units per 1000 residents. The vacancy rate for the municipality, in 2010, was 0.11%.

The historical population is given in the following chart:

== Politics ==
In the 2007 federal election the most popular party was the FDP which received 30.97% of the vote. The next three most popular parties were the SVP (20.01%), the CVP (17.66%) and the SP (17.43%). In the federal election, a total of 1,008 votes were cast, and the voter turnout was 66.1%.

In the 2009 Conseil d'État/Staatsrat election a total of 916 votes were cast, of which 34 or about 3.7% were invalid. The voter participation was 59.6%, which is similar to the cantonal average of 54.67%. In the 2007 Swiss Council of States election a total of 1,003 votes were cast, of which 62 or about 6.2% were invalid. The voter participation was 66.3%, which is much more than the cantonal average of 59.88%.

== Economy ==
As of 2010, Riddes had an unemployment rate of 6.6%. As of 2008, there were 140 people employed in the primary economic sector and about 49 businesses involved in this sector. 288 people were employed in the secondary sector and there were 26 businesses in this sector. 567 people were employed in the tertiary sector, with 86 businesses in this sector. There were 1,023 residents of the municipality who were employed in some capacity, of which females made up 41.3% of the workforce.

In 2008 the total number of full-time equivalent jobs was 807. The number of jobs in the primary sector was 93, all of which were in agriculture. The number of jobs in the secondary sector was 272 of which 148 or (54.4%) were in manufacturing and 69 (25.4%) were in construction. The number of jobs in the tertiary sector was 442. In the tertiary sector; 177 or 40.0% were in wholesale or retail sales or the repair of motor vehicles, 12 or 2.7% were in the movement and storage of goods, 43 or 9.7% were in a hotel or restaurant, 1 was in the information industry, 15 or 3.4% were the insurance or financial industry, 29 or 6.6% were technical professionals or scientists, 11 or 2.5% were in education and 81 or 18.3% were in health care.

In 2000, there were 324 workers who commuted into the municipality and 522 workers who commuted away. The municipality is a net exporter of workers, with about 1.6 workers leaving the municipality for every one entering. Of the working population, 12.3% used public transportation to get to work, and 63.9% used a private car.

== Religion ==
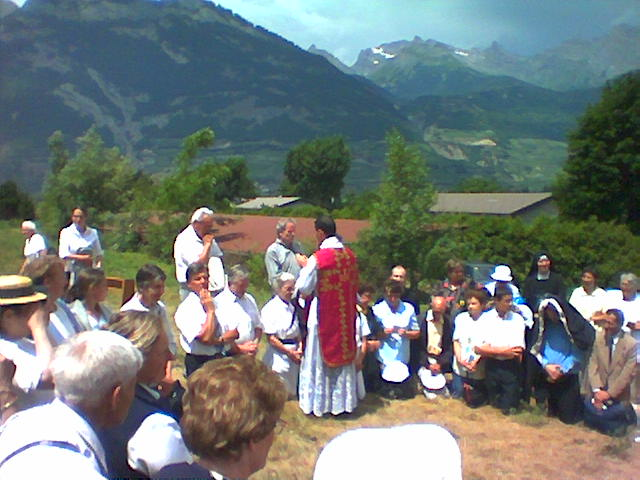
A priest giving blessings after ordination at the SSPX seminary at Écône

From the 2000 census, 1,910 or 86.9% were Roman Catholic, while 98 or 4.5% belonged to the Swiss Reformed Church. Of the rest of the population, there was 1 member of an Orthodox church, and there were 9 individuals (or about 0.41% of the population) who belonged to another Christian church. There was 1 individual who was Jewish, and 18 (or about 0.82% of the population) who were Islamic. There were 2 individuals who were Buddhist and 4 individuals who belonged to another church. 64 (or about 2.91% of the population) belonged to no church, are agnostic or atheist, and 93 individuals (or about 4.23% of the population) did not answer the question.

The International Seminary of Saint Pius X, the premier seminary of the Society of Saint Pius X, is located in Écône in Riddle. It is one of the six houses for formation for the future priests of The Society of Saint Pius X. The Seminary of Écône was founded in 1970 by Archbishop Marcel Lefebvre, and his tomb can be found there.

== Education ==
In Riddes about 676 or (30.8%) of the population have completed non-mandatory upper secondary education, and 143 or (6.5%) have completed additional higher education (either university or a Fachhochschule). Of the 143 who completed tertiary schooling, 60.1% were Swiss men, 21.0% were Swiss women, 15.4% were non-Swiss men and 3.5% were non-Swiss women.

As of 2000, there were 75 students in Riddes who came from another municipality, while 113 residents attended schools outside the municipality.

Riddes is home to the Bibliothèque communale et scolaire library. The library has (as of 2008) 6,867 books or other media, and loaned out 8,328 items in the same year. It was open a total of 160 days with average of 8 hours per week during that year.

== Tourism ==
Riddes is home to Les Fils Maye, one of the canton of Valais' only 19th-century wineries that remains in the ownership of the original family.

== See also ==
- Écône
- La Tzoumaz
- The International Seminary of Saint Pius X
