= Rudolf Trümpy =

Swiss geologist (1921–2009)

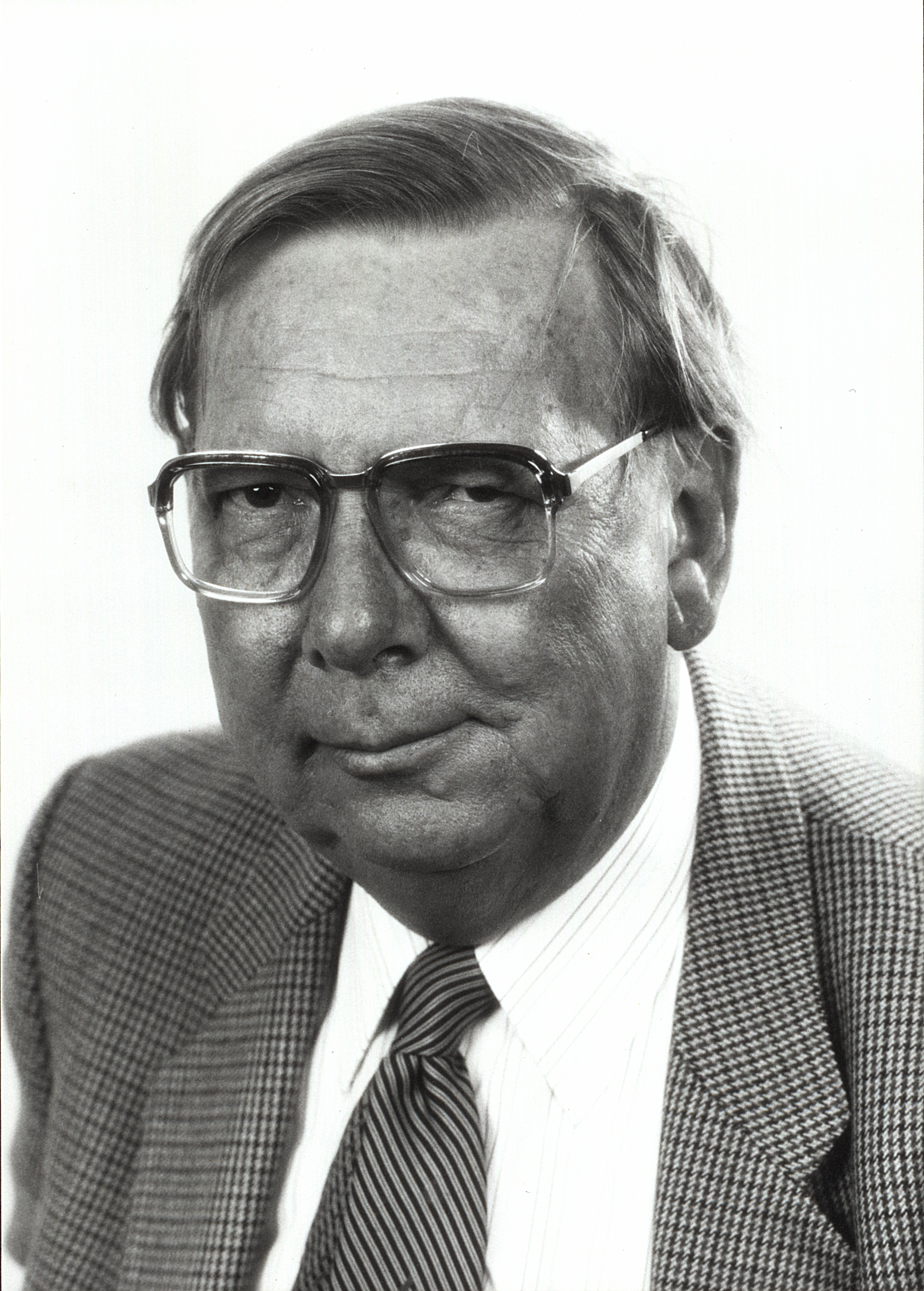
- Born: 16 August 1921; Glarus, Switzerland
- Died: 30 January 2009 (aged 87); Küssnacht, Switzerland
- Education: ETH Zürich
- Awards: Gustav-Steinmann-Medaille (1998)
- Scientific career
- Workplaces: University of Lausanne, ETH Zürich
- Thesis: Der Lias der Glarner Alpen (1947)

Rudolf Trümpy (16 August 1921 – 30 January 2009) was a Swiss geologist, who was born in the small Swiss town of Glarus. He graduated from the ETH Zürich in the late 1940s with a thesis titled: "Der Lias der Glarner Alpen". From 1947 to 1953 he spent his post-doctoral years in Lausanne before being appointed professor at ETH Zürich in 1953. He would remain there until 1986.

His research mainly concentrated on alpine geology. However, he also published papers on extra-alpine regions like Greenland, the Montagne Noire and the Sahara. He was the author of the reference book Geology of Switzerland.

Trümpy is the recipient of numerous awards and prizes including the Wollaston Medal and the Penrose Medal. In 1978 he was elected a Foreign Associate of the United States National Academy of Sciences. He is also a member of the French Academy of Sciences.

Many stratigraphic formations in the western Alps were first described by Trümpy. For example, the Couches de l'Aroley, the Couches des Marmontains and the Couches de St Cristoph.
