= Marmontains Formation =

Geologic formation in France and Switzerland

Couches des Marmontains
- Stratigraphic range: Albian-Cenomanian; ~112–94 Ma
- Type: Geological formation
- Unit of: Valais trilogy
- Underlies: Couches de Saint Christophe
- Overlies: Couches de l’Aroley
- Thickness: 5 to 30 m (16 to 98 ft)

Location
- Coordinates: 45.696144°N 6.734438°E
- Region: Savoie
- Country: France, Switzerland

Type section
- Named for: L’arête des Marmontains

The Couches des Marmontains are a sedimentary formation deposited during the middle Cretaceous (Albian to Cenomanian). It consists of sandstones and black shales. The formation is 5 to 30 m thick. The Couches des Marmontains overly the Couches de l’Aroley and underlie the Couches de Saint Christophe. All three units together make up the post-rift sequence of the Valais ocean. Outcrops can be found north of Bourg-Saint-Maurice.

The Couches des Marmontains can be found in the following nappes:

- External Valais

- Moûtiers unit
- Roc de l'Enfer unit
- Petit St. Bernard unit

- Internal Valais

- Versoyen unit

The type locality and namesake of the formation is the mountain Marmontains (45.88263°N 7.108412°E) and the Val Ferret in Orsières, Canton Valais, Switzerland. It was first described in 1955 by Rudolf Trümpy.

The Marmontains Formation can be correlated with the Valzeina Formation of Graubünden and black shales in the Engadine.
