= Saxon, Switzerland =

Saxon
- Municipality
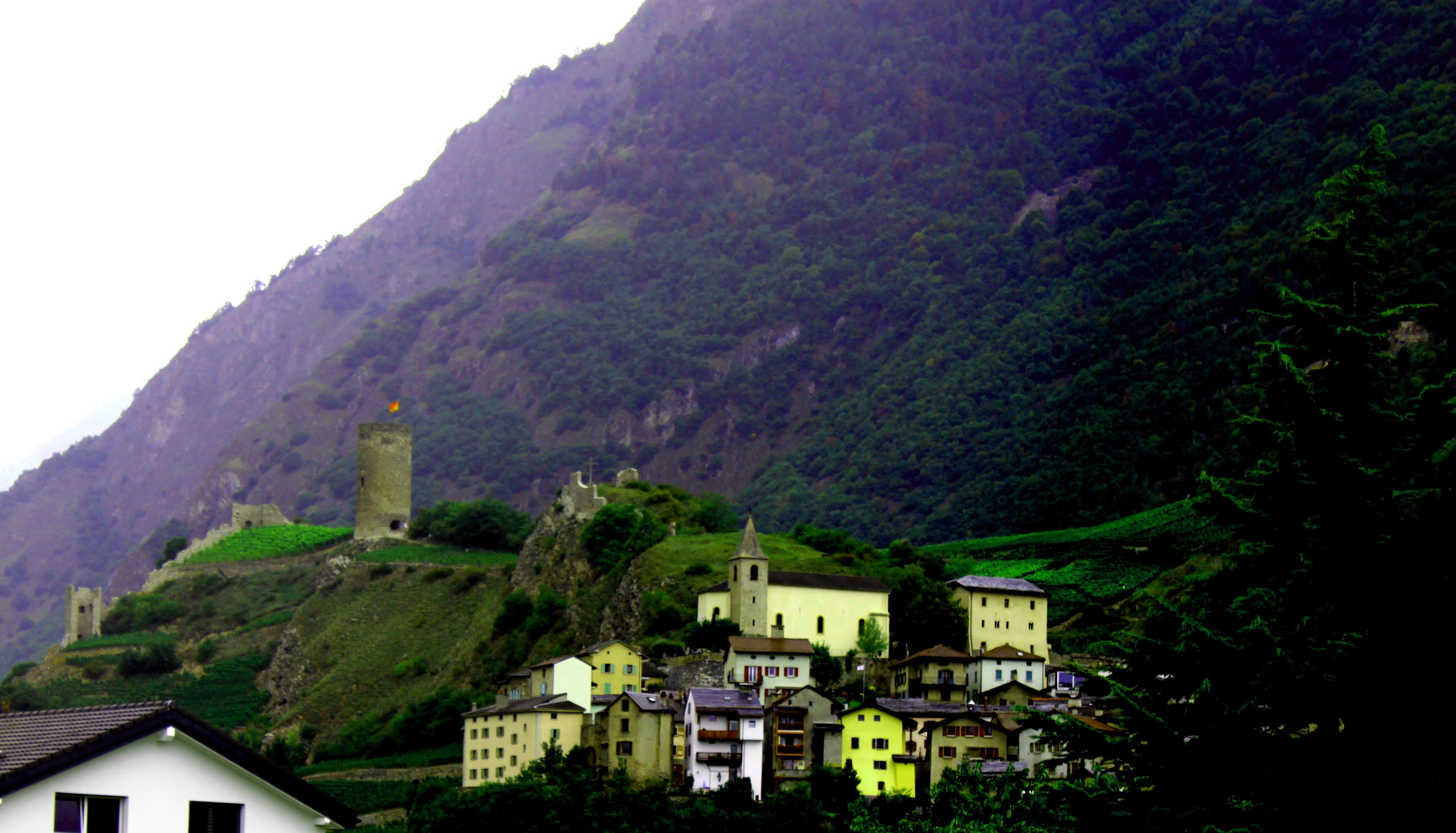
- Saxon tower, above the village

- Flag Coat of arms
- Location of Saxon
- Location within Switzerland Location within Canton of Valais
- Coordinates: 46°9′N 7°10′E
- Country: Switzerland
- Canton: Valais
- District: Martigny

Government
  - Mayor: Léo Farquet

Area
  - Total: 23.2 km^{2} (9.0 sq mi)
- Elevation: 533 m (1,749 ft)

Population (December 2002)
  - Total: 3,450
  - Density: 149/km^{2} (385/sq mi)
- Time zone: UTC+01:00 (CET)
  - Summer (DST): UTC+02:00 (CEST)
- Postal code: 1907
- SFOS number: 6141
- ISO 3166 code: CH-VS
- Surrounded by: Bagnes, Charrat, Fully, Riddes, Saillon, Vollèges
- Twin towns: Bouliac (France)
- Website: www.saxon.ch

Saxon (Arpitan: Sasson) is a municipality, in the district of Martigny, in the canton of Valais, in Switzerland.

== History ==
Saxon is first mentioned in 1153 as de Saxone.

== Geography ==
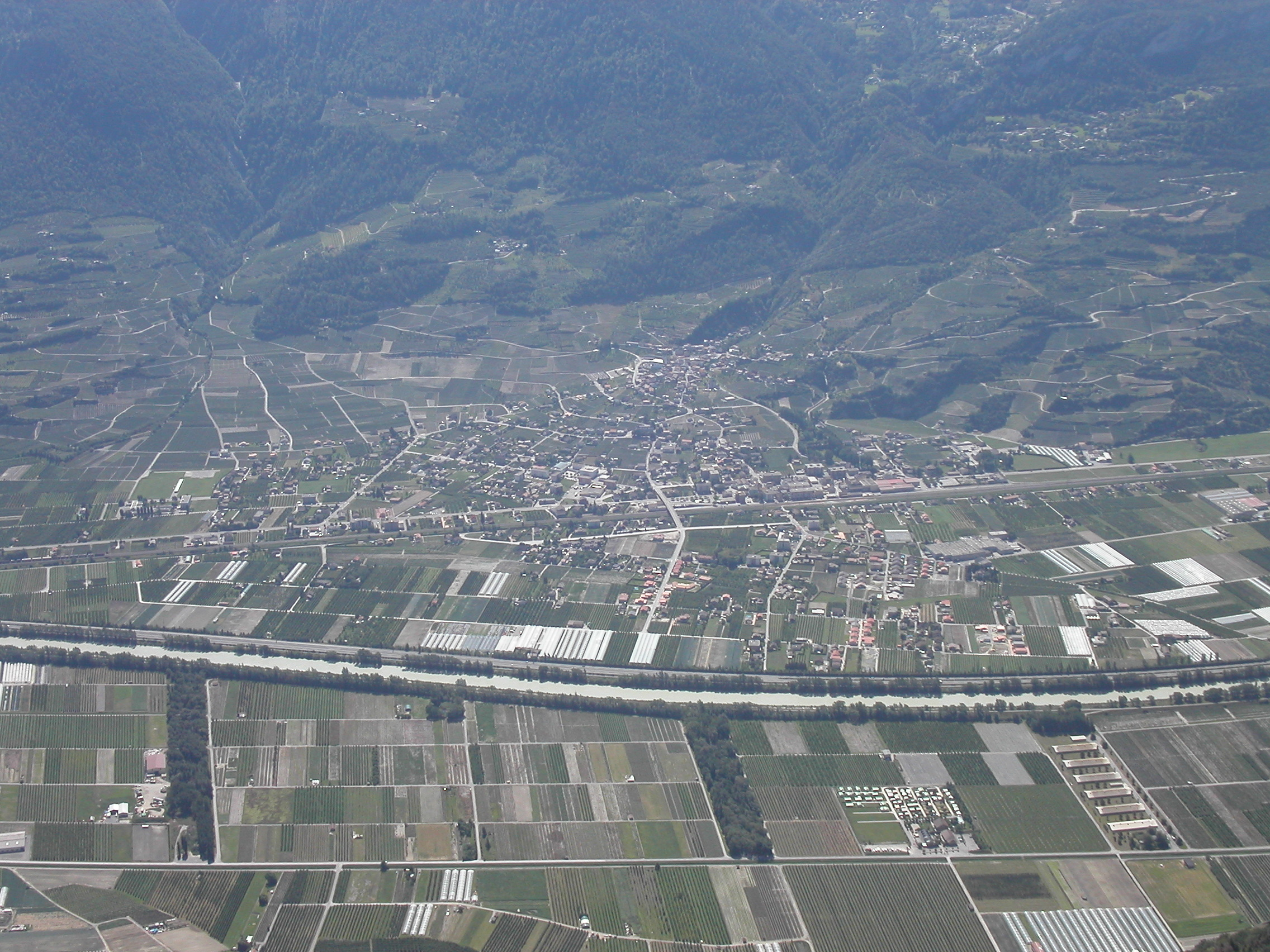
Saxon village

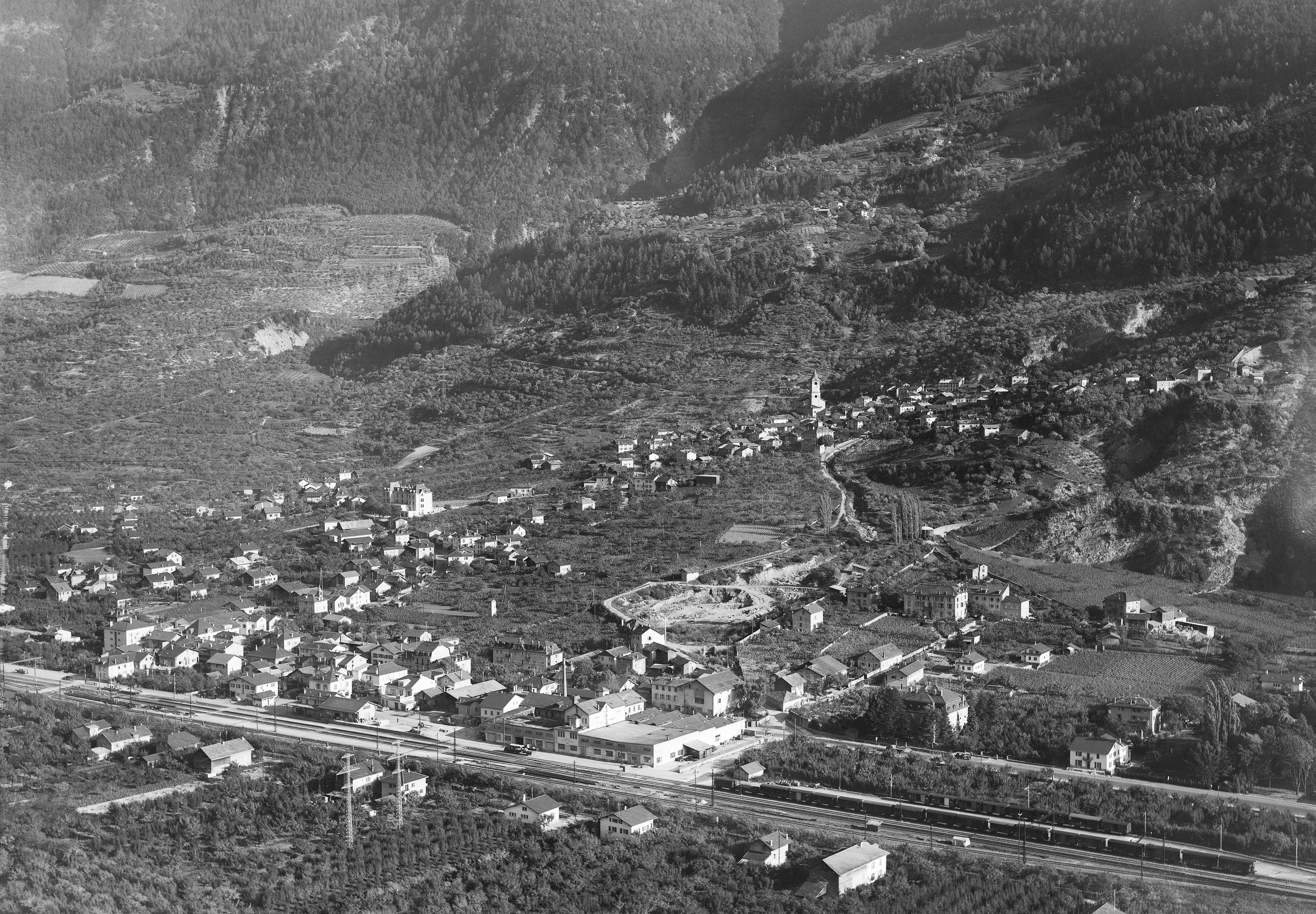
Aerial view (1955)

Saxon has an area, as of 2011, of 23.2 square kilometers (9.0 mi^{2}). Of this area, 31.9% is used for agricultural purposes, while 50.6% is forested. Of the rest of the land, 9.3% is settled (buildings or roads) and 8.1% is unproductive land.

The municipality is located in the Martigny district, along the left bank of the Rhone. It stretches from the Pierre-à-Voir (2,476 metres [8,123 ft]) down to the Rhone. It consists of the villages of Saxon and Gottefrey and scattered hamlets.

== Coat of arms ==
The blazon of the municipal coat of arms is Gules a trefoil branch Argent

== Demographics ==
Saxon has a population (as of December 2020) of 6,278. As of 2008, 28.8% of the population are resident foreign nationals. Over the last 10 years (2000–2010 ) the population has changed at a rate of 29.8%. It has changed at a rate of 33.9% due to migration and at a rate of 1.3% due to births and deaths.

Most of the population (as of 2000) speaks French (2,845 or 85.9%) as their first language, Portuguese is the second most common (154 or 4.6%) and Albanian is the third (112 or 3.4%). There are 56 people who speak German, 61 people who speak Italian and 1 person who speaks Romansh.

As of 2008, the population was 49.5% male and 50.5% female. The population was made up of 1,478 Swiss men (34.1% of the population) and 669 (15.4%) non-Swiss men. There were 1,570 Swiss women (36.2%) and 621 (14.3%) non-Swiss women. Of the population in the municipality, 1,441 or about 43.5% were born in Saxon and lived there in 2000. There were 780 or 23.6% who were born in the same canton, while 332 or 10.0% were born somewhere else in Switzerland, and 716 or 21.6% were born outside of Switzerland.

As of 2000, children and teenagers (0–19 years old) make up 23.4% of the population, while adults (20–64 years old) make up 60.2% and seniors (over 64 years old) make up 16.5%.

As of 2000, there were 1,284 people who were single and never married in the municipality. There were 1,602 married individuals, 219 widows or widowers and 207 individuals who are divorced.

As of 2000, there were 1,359 private households in the municipality, and an average of 2.4 persons per household. There were 410 households that consist of only one person and 88 households with five or more people. In 2000, a total of 1,309 apartments (73.4% of the total) were permanently occupied, while 320 apartments (17.9%) were seasonally occupied and 155 apartments (8.7%) were empty. As of 2009, the construction rate of new housing units was 21.2 new units per 1000 residents. The vacancy rate for the municipality, in 2010, was 2.97%.

The historical population is given in the following chart:

== Politics ==
In the 2007 federal election the most popular party was the FDP which received 24.87% of the vote. The next three most popular parties were the SVP (23.97%), the CVP (20.95%) and the SP (14.23%). In the federal election, a total of 1,306 votes were cast, and the voter turnout was 56.0%.

In the 2009 Conseil d'Etat/Staatsrat election a total of 1,287 votes were cast, of which 96 or about 7.5% were invalid. The voter participation was 53.7%, which is similar to the cantonal average of 54.67%. In the 2007 Swiss Council of States election a total of 1,281 votes were cast, of which 106 or about 8.3% were invalid. The voter participation was 55.5%, which is similar to the cantonal average of 59.88%.

== Economy ==
As of 2010, Saxon had an unemployment rate of 9.7%. As of 2008, there were 225 people employed in the primary economic sector and about 88 businesses involved in this sector. 229 people were employed in the secondary sector and there were 41 businesses in this sector. 734 people were employed in the tertiary sector, with 116 businesses in this sector. There were 1,530 residents of the municipality who were employed in some capacity, of which females made up 41.4% of the workforce.

In 2008 the total number of full-time equivalent jobs was 966. The number of jobs in the primary sector was 137, all of which were in agriculture. The number of jobs in the secondary sector was 220 of which 72 or (32.7%) were in manufacturing, 4 or (1.8%) were in mining and 143 (65.0%) were in construction. The number of jobs in the tertiary sector was 609. In the tertiary sector; 286 or 47.0% were in wholesale or retail sales or the repair of motor vehicles, 16 or 2.6% were in the movement and storage of goods, 50 or 8.2% were in a hotel or restaurant, 4 or 0.7% were in the information industry, 10 or 1.6% were the insurance or financial industry, 36 or 5.9% were technical professionals or scientists, 23 or 3.8% were in education and 123 or 20.2% were in health care.

In 2000, there were 406 workers who commuted into the municipality and 878 workers who commuted away. The municipality is a net exporter of workers, with about 2.2 workers leaving the municipality for every one entering. Of the working population, 9.8% used public transportation to get to work, and 69.2% used a private car.

== Religion ==
From the 2000 census, 2,577 or 77.8% were Roman Catholic, while 224 or 6.8% belonged to the Swiss Reformed Church. Of the rest of the population, there were 12 members of an Orthodox church (or about 0.36% of the population), there were 8 individuals (or about 0.24% of the population) who belonged to the Christian Catholic Church, and there were 33 individuals (or about 1.00% of the population) who belonged to another Christian church. There was 1 individual who was Jewish, and 206 (or about 6.22% of the population) who were Islamic. There were 5 individuals who were Buddhist and 3 individuals who belonged to another church. 165 (or about 4.98% of the population) belonged to no church, are agnostic or atheist, and 93 individuals (or about 2.81% of the population) did not answer the question.

== Education ==
In Saxon about 1,008 or (30.4%) of the population have completed non-mandatory upper secondary education, and 219 or (6.6%) have completed additional higher education (either university or a Fachhochschule). Of the 219 who completed tertiary schooling, 53.0% were Swiss men, 32.9% were Swiss women, 9.1% were non-Swiss men and 5.0% were non-Swiss women.

As of 2000, there were 5 students in Saxon who came from another municipality, while 211 residents attended schools outside the municipality.

Saxon is home to the Bibliothèque communale et scolaire library. The library has (as of 2008) 11,003 books or other media, and loaned out 16,696 items in the same year. It was open a total of 132 days with average of 19 hours per week during that year.
