= Val de Bagnes =

Valley in the canton of Valais, Switzerland

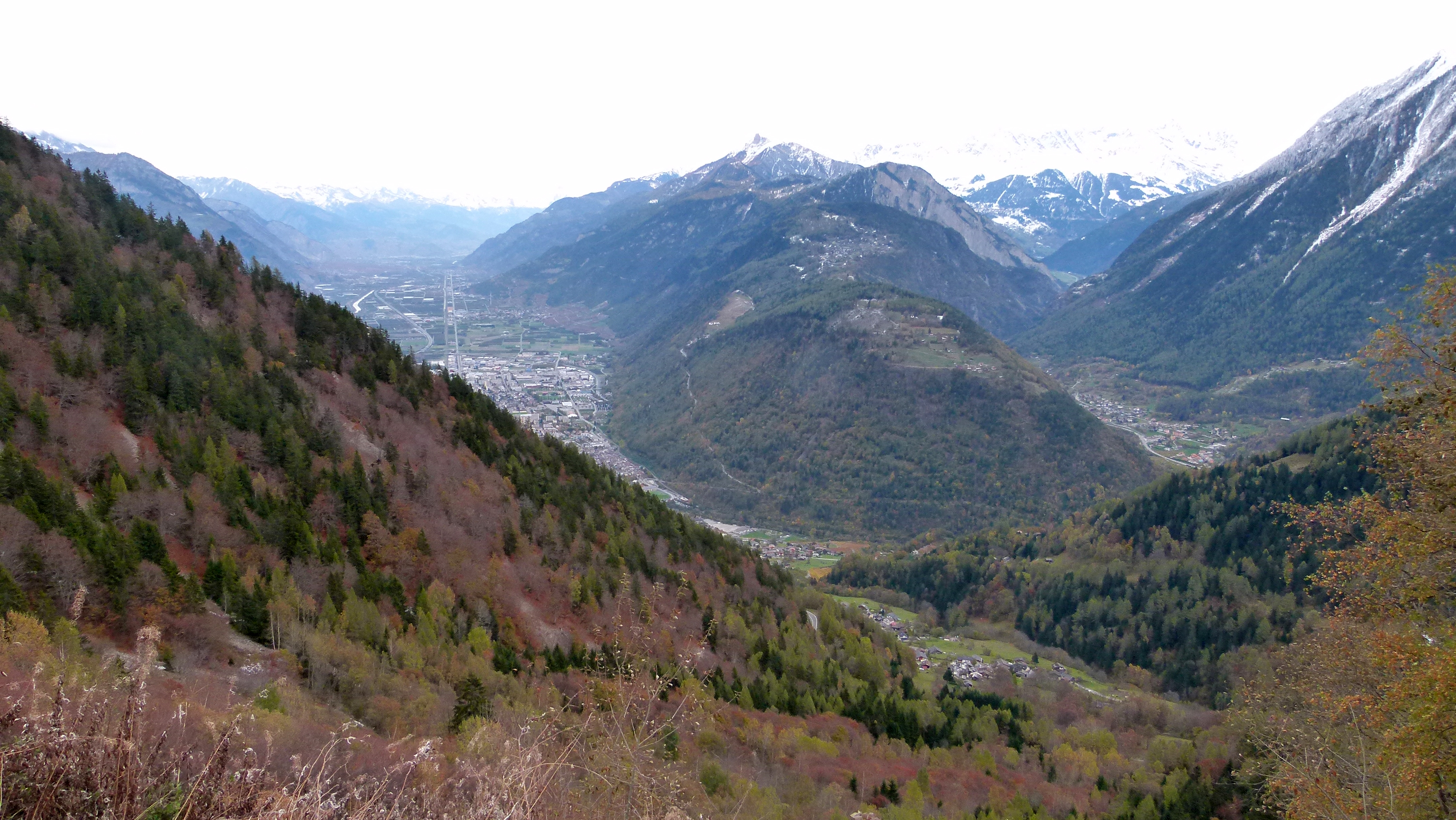
- View of the Val de Bagnes (right) and the Rhone Valley (left) from Martigny.

- Location within Canton of Valais
- Length: 25 km (16 mi)

Geography
- Location: Entremont District, Valais, Switzerland
- Population centers: See below
- Coordinates: 46°1′18″N 07°18′36″E
- Rivers: Drance
- Interactive map of Val de Bagnes

Val de Bagnes (French pronunciation: [val də baɲ]), also called the Vallée de Bagnes (German: Bangital or Baniental) is a valley located in the Entremont District in the Canton of Valais of Switzerland.

== Geography ==
Val de Bagnes is traversed by the Drance de Bagnes. In the upper part of the valley is the Lac de Mauvoisin and towards the southern end of the valley the Glacier de Fenêtre and the Chanrion Hut. From Val de Bagnes, the Aosta Valley can be reached via the Fenêtre de Durand in the Grand Combin. At Sembrancher, the Val de Bagnes flows into the Val d’Entremont.

The main mountain peaks in Val de Bagnes are:

- Grand Combin 4,314 m (14,154 ft)
- La Ruinette 3,875 m (12,713 ft)
- Mont Blanc de Cheilon 3,870 m (12,697 ft)
- Petit Combin 3,663 m (12,018 ft)
- Mont Gelé 3,518 m (11,542 ft)
- Pointe d'Otemma 3,403 m (11,165 ft)
- Rosablanche 3,336 m (10,945 ft)
- Mont Avril 3,346 m (10,978 ft)

== Municipalities ==
Most of the valley is organized into a single municipality, also called Val de Bagnes, while a small part extends into the neighboring municipality of Sembrancher. The most famous resort in Val de Bagnes is Verbier. Other villages include:

- Le Châble, the municipal seat.
- Villette
- Le Cotterg
- Fontanelle
- Médières
- Vollèges
- Vens
- Le Levron
- Bruson
- Versegères
- Prarreyer
- Champsec
- Lourtier
- Sarreyer
- Fionnay

== Tourism ==
Tourism emerged in Val de Bagnes at the end of the 19th century. Numerous infrastructure projects have been carried out for tourism; the Médran chairlift was built in 1950 (winter tourism); Summer tourism began in Fionnay as early as 1890, then also in Bruson and Verbier.

== Transport ==
- Val de Bagnes is accessible by rail through the Martigny–Orsières Railway. The Martigny–Sembrancher line, which continues to Orsières in the Val d’Entremont, was completed in 1910. The Sembrancher – Le Châble branch line into the Val de Bagnes was completed in 1952.
- At Martigny, the A21/H21 branches off from the A9 in the direction of the Great St Bernard Tunnel and branches off at Sembrancher into the Val de Bagnes and Val d’Entremont.
