= Bagnes =

- Former municipality
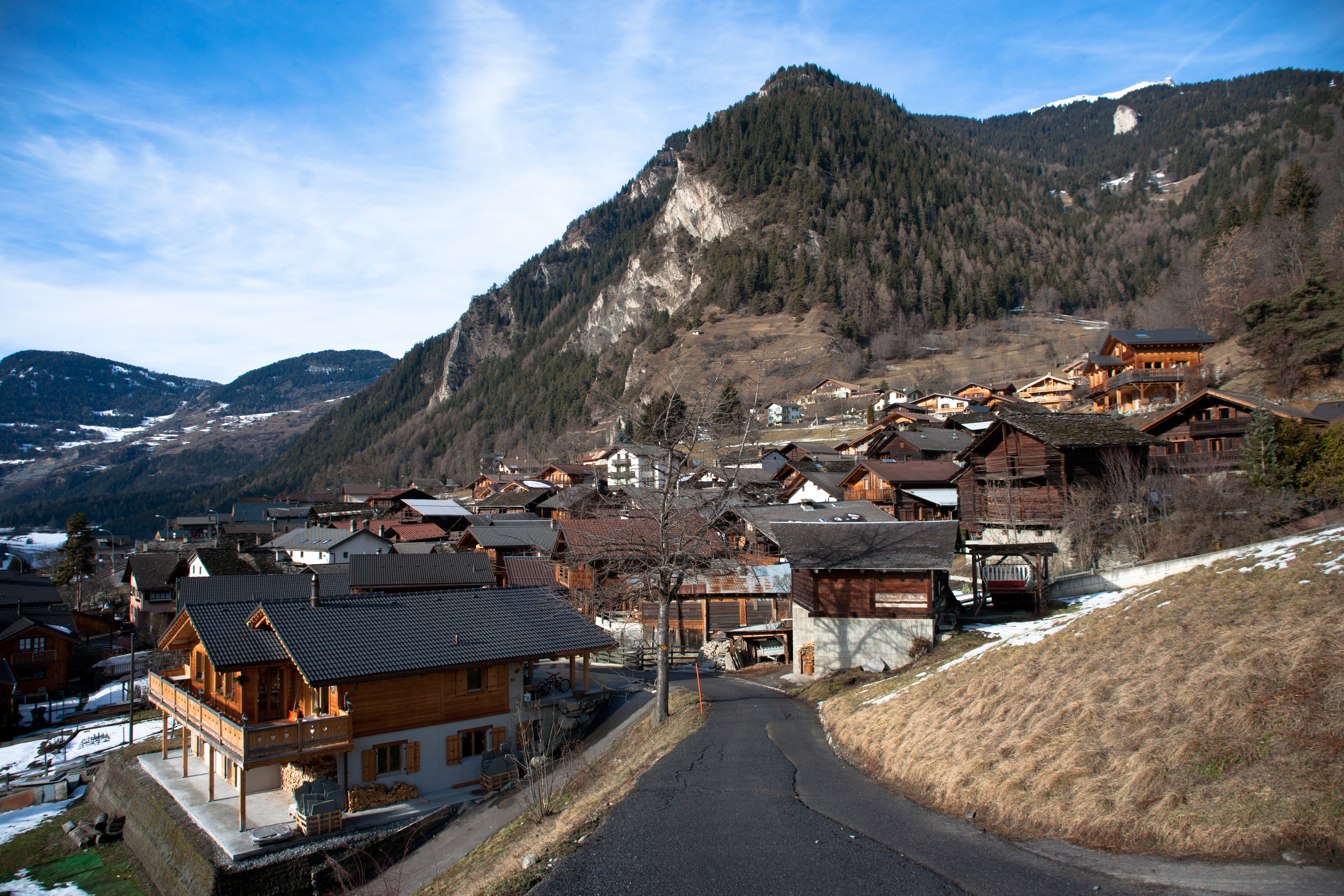
- Cotterg, a village of Bagnes.

- Flag Coat of arms
- Location of Bagnes
- Location within Switzerland Location within Canton of Valais
- Coordinates: 46°5′N 7°13′E
- Country: Switzerland
- Canton: Valais
- District: Entremont

Government
  - Mayor: Eloi Rossier

Area
  - Total: 282.3 km^{2} (109.0 sq mi)
- Elevation (Le Châble): 820 m (2,690 ft)

Population (December 2019)
  - Total: 8,144
  - Density: 28.85/km^{2} (74.72/sq mi)
- Time zone: UTC+01:00 (CET)
  - Summer (DST): UTC+02:00 (CEST)
- Postal code: 1934 (Le Châble)
- SFOS number: 6031
- ISO 3166 code: CH-VS
- Localities: Val de Bagnes, Bruson, Champsec, Cotterg, Fionnay, Le Châble, Les Morgnes, Lourtier, Medières, Mauvoisin, Montagnier, Prarreyer, Sarreyer, Verbier, Versegères, Villette
- Surrounded by: Vollèges, Sembrancher, Saxon VS, Riddes, Nendaz, Hérémence, Evolène, .. (Italy), Bourg-Saint-Pierre, Liddes, Orsières
- Website: www.bagnes.ch

Bagnes (French pronunciation: [baɲ]) is a former municipality in the district of Entremont in the canton of Valais in Switzerland. On 1 January 2021 the former municipalities of Bagnes and Vollèges merged to form the new municipality of Val de Bagnes.

With an area of 282 km^{2} (108.88 sq mi), Bagnes used to be the largest municipality of Switzerland until the formation of Glarus Süd in 2011.

== History ==
Aerial view (1964)

Bagnes was first mentioned in 1150 as Banie. It was formerly known by its German name, Bangis, although this is no longer used.

Before 1150, when it came to the abbey of Saint-Maurice, Bagnes was owned by the Counts of Savoy. It remained under the abbey's authority until 1798, when it became part of the Entremont district. Verbier castle (also called the abbaye) is first mentioned in 1287 in Le Châble and was presumably destroyed in 1476.

Throughout the 19th century, the radicals and conservatives feuded violently in the villages. This led, in 1844, to the bloody battle of Corberaye, in which three conservatives were killed. The battle of Corberaye brought the radicals to power, but the conservatives were able gain support from political allies and were able to return to power shortly thereafter. One consequence of this political discord was the founding of the liberal-radical free school in 1900. At the free school there was no religious instruction, in contrast to the other village schools which had been founded by religious groups. The free school remained open until 1943.

The parish is first mentioned in 1178, with the parish church at St. Martin's church in Le Châble. The parsonage was built in 1686 at Verbier. It became a rectory in 1915 and a parish in 1962. Other chapels are located in Montagnier (14th century), Sarreyer (after 1639), Lourtier (1659), Vernays (1661), Media (1679), Champsec (1684) and Versegères (1684).

The municipality suffered from frequent natural disasters, especially from the floods of the Dranse in 1469, 1595 and a particularly devastating flood in 1818. There were silver mines in the area between 1344 and 1723 and again between 1852 and 1855. In 1958 the Lac de Mauvoisin Dam was built. The dam along with increasing tourism in the mid-20th century changed the character of the villages dramatically. The village economies changed from alpine farming to domination by the services sector.

Until 1957 Bagnes was a loose federation of villages, which was divided into districts or sections. The local councils continued to represent their sections until 1971.

=== Le Châble ===
Starting in the 12th century, Le Châble was the administrative center of the entire Val de Bagnes. Verbier castle (also called the abbaye) is first mentioned in 1287. The castle came to be known as the abbaye since it was the seat of the abbey of Saint-Maurice's representative. In 1410 the castle was rebuilt into a residence of the abbots. In 1476 it was partially destroyed by the villagers. In 1745 it was besieged during the revolt against the abbot of Saint-Maurice. The castle was acquired in the 20th century by the municipality.

The facade of the late gothic parish church of St. Mauritius was built in 1520 and the choir was finished in 1534. The ossuary dates back to 1560 and the parish house to the 16th century.

In 1953, the village was connected to the Martigny-Sembrancher-Le Châble rail line.

== Geography ==
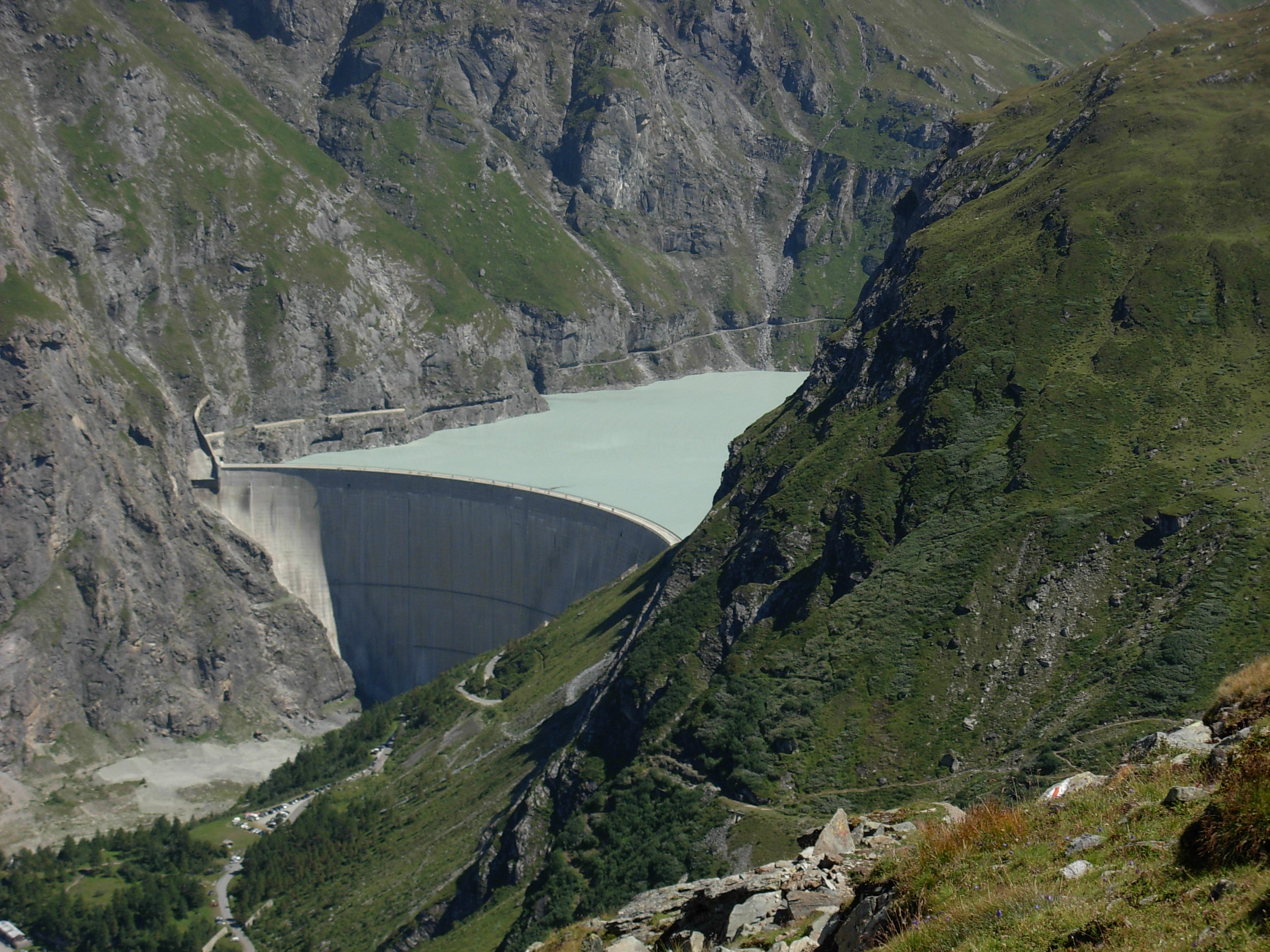
Lac de Mauvoisin and dam in Bagnes municipality

Bagnes had an area, as of 2011, of 282.2 square kilometers (109.0 mi^{2}). Of this area, 15.5% is used for agricultural purposes, while 12.5% is forested. Of the rest of the land, 1.9% is settled (buildings or roads) and 70.1% is unproductive land.

It consists of the former municipal seat of Le Châble along with multiple villages and hamlets, including Villette, Bruson and Verbier.

The resort Verbier is part of the municipality.

The reservoir Lac de Mauvoisin is located at Bagnes.

== Coat of arms ==
The blazon of the municipal coat of arms is Azure, two Men proper in a Bath-tub Or.

== Demographics ==
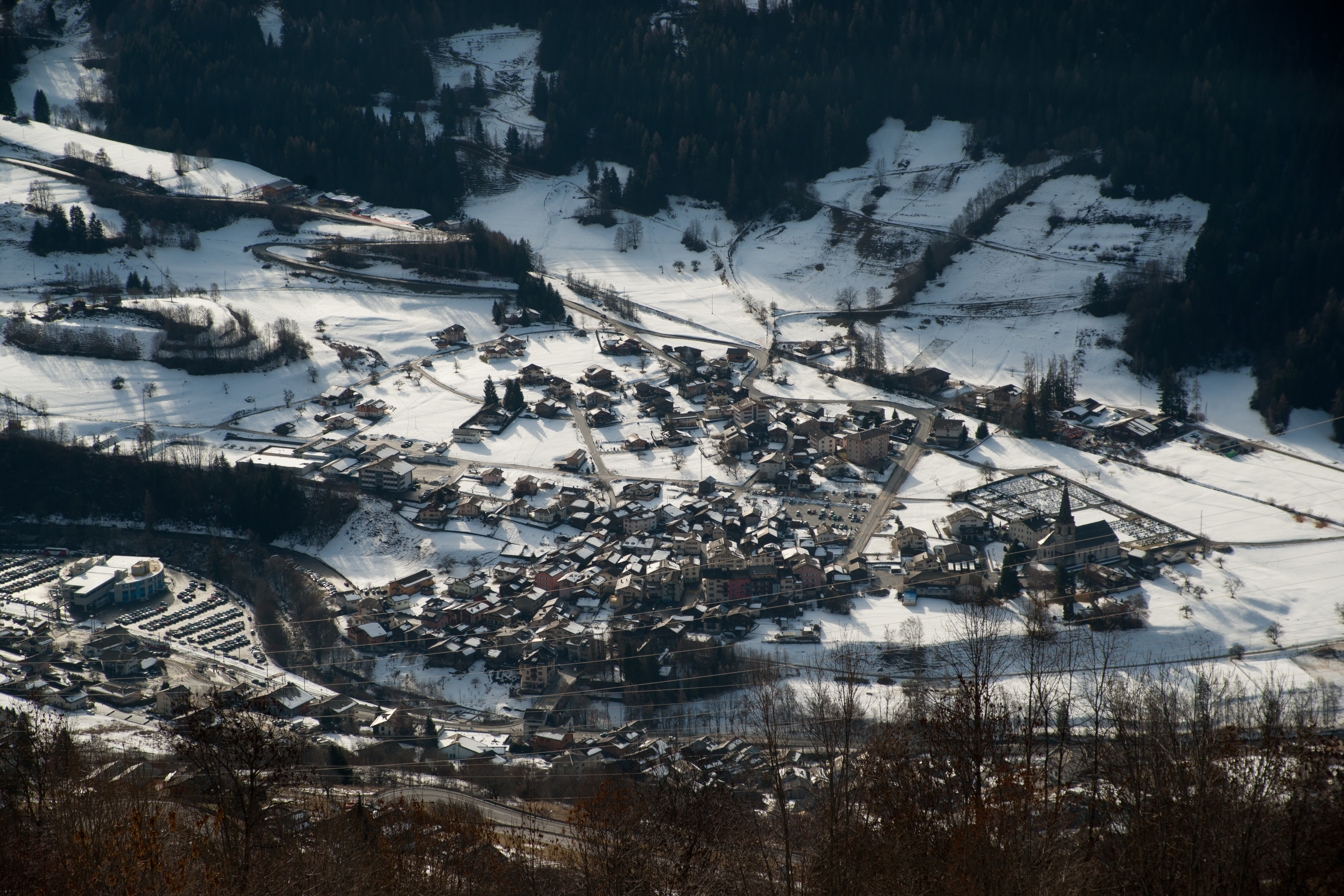
Le Châble village

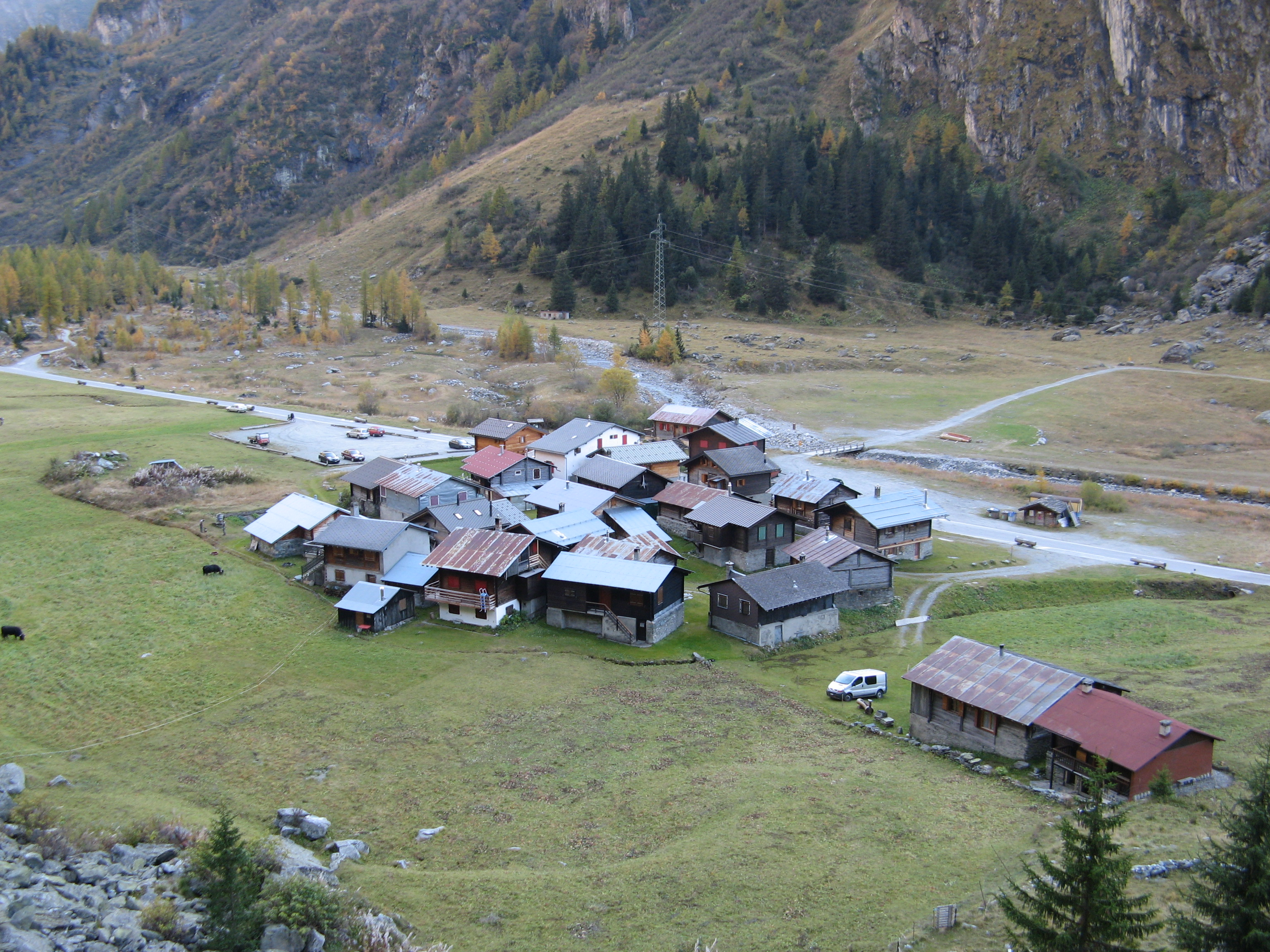
Bonatchiesse village

Bagnes had a population (as of 2019) of 8,144. As of 2008, 26.3% of the population are resident foreign nationals. Over the last 10 years (1999–2009 ) the population has changed at a rate of 24.3%. It has changed at a rate of 29.3% due to migration and at a rate of 2.7% due to births and deaths.

Most of the population (as of 2000) speaks French (5,714 or 87.4%) as their first language, Portuguese is the second most common (246 or 3.8%) and English is the third (178 or 2.7%). There are 139 people who speak German, 99 people who speak Italian and 2 people who speak Romansh.

As of 2008, the gender distribution of the population was 51.5% male and 48.5% female. The population was made up of 2,750 Swiss men (36.1% of the population) and 1,169 (15.3%) non-Swiss men. There were 2,769 Swiss women (36.4%) and 929 (12.2%) non-Swiss women. Of the population in the municipality 3,508 or about 53.7% were born in Bagnes and lived there in 2000. There were 744 or 11.4% who were born in the same canton, while 694 or 10.6% were born somewhere else in Switzerland, and 1,422 or 21.8% were born outside of Switzerland.

The age distribution of the population (as of 2000) is children and teenagers (0–19 years old) make up 22.2% of the population, while adults (20–64 years old) make up 62.3% and seniors (over 64 years old) make up 15.5%.

As of 2000, there were 2,864 people who were single and never married in the municipality. There were 3,019 married individuals, 398 widows or widowers and 255 individuals who are divorced.

As of 2000, there were 2,469 private households in the municipality, and an average of 2.4 persons per household. There were 831 households that consist of only one person and 204 households with five or more people. Out of a total of 2,631 households that answered this question, 31.6% were households made up of just one person and there were 29 adults who lived with their parents. Of the rest of the households, there are 554 married couples without children, 836 married couples with children. There were 163 single parents with a child or children. There were 56 households that were made up of unrelated people and 162 households that were made up of some sort of institution or another collective housing.

In 2000 there were 2,045 single family homes (or 62.8% of the total) out of a total of 3,258 inhabited buildings. There were 845 multi-family buildings (25.9%), along with 185 multi-purpose buildings that were mostly used for housing (5.7%) and 183 other use buildings (commercial or industrial) that also had some housing (5.6%).

In 2000, a total of 2,331 apartments (32.3% of the total) were permanently occupied, while 4,690 apartments (65.1%) were seasonally occupied and 187 apartments (2.6%) were empty. As of 2009, the construction rate of new housing units was 3.7 new units per 1000 residents. The vacancy rate for the municipality, in 2010, was 0.98%.

Historical population

Year	Pop.	±% p.a.
1850	4,278	—
1860	4,327	+0.11%
1870	4,266	−0.14%
1880	4,257	−0.02%
1888	4,233	−0.07%
1900	4,127	−0.21%

Year	Pop.	±% p.a.
1910	4,062	−0.16%
1920	3,997	−0.16%
1930	3,722	−0.71%
1941	3,601	−0.30%
1950	3,609	+0.02%
1960	4,237	+1.62%

Year	Pop.	±% p.a.
1970	4,541	+0.70%
1980	4,652	+0.24%
1990	5,107	+0.94%
2000	6,536	+2.50%

== Heritage sites of national significance ==
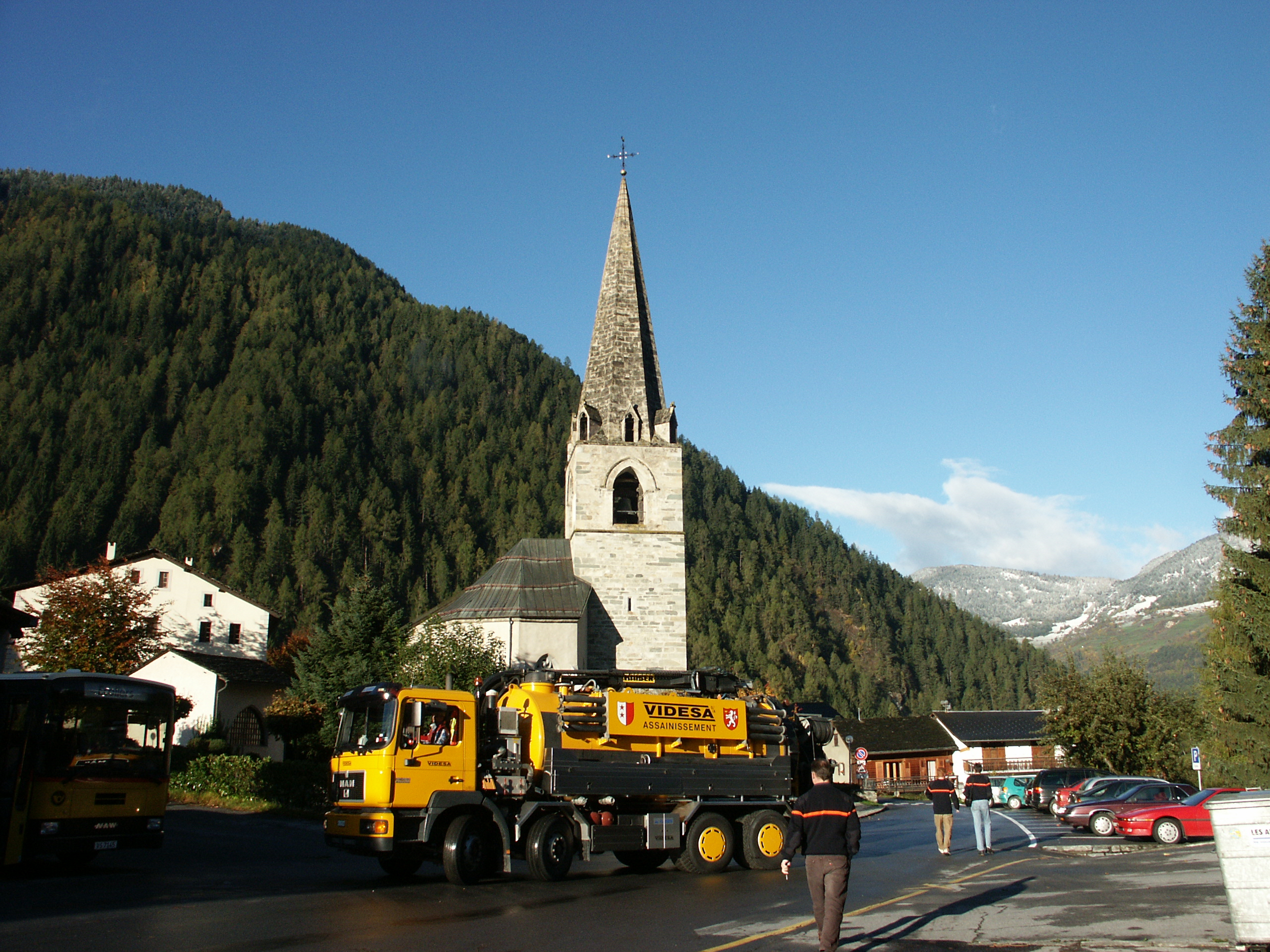
Church of St-Maurice

The Alpage (alpine pasture) de Louvie and the Church of St-Maurice with ossuary and the former rectory are listed as Swiss heritage site of national significance. The villages of Bruson, Le Châble, Médières and Sarreyer along with the hamlet of Fontenelle are all part of the Inventory of Swiss Heritage Sites.

== Politics ==
In the 2007 federal election the most popular party was the CVP which received 47.96% of the vote. The next three most popular parties were the FDP (17.51%), the SVP (16.97%) and the SP (10%). In the federal election, a total of 2,039 votes were cast, and the voter turnout was 46.3%.

In the 2009 Conseil d'État/Staatsrat election a total of 1,597 votes were cast, of which 124 or about 7.8% were invalid. The voter participation was 37.3%, which is much less than the cantonal average of 54.67%. In the 2007 Swiss Council of States election a total of 2,002 votes were cast, of which 157 or about 7.8% were invalid. The voter participation was 46.5%, which is much less than the cantonal average of 59.88%.

== Economy ==
As of 2010, Bagnes had an unemployment rate of 3.9%. As of 2008, there were 282 people employed in the primary economic sector and about 107 businesses involved in this sector. 1,017 people were employed in the secondary sector and there were 103 businesses in this sector. 2,525 people were employed in the tertiary sector, with 390 businesses in this sector. There were 3,461 residents of the municipality who were employed in some capacity, of which females made up 40.9% of the workforce.

In 2008 the total number of full-time equivalent jobs was 3,189. The number of jobs in the primary sector was 125, of which 108 were in agriculture and 17 were in forestry or lumber production. The number of jobs in the secondary sector was 989 of which 253 or (25.6%) were in manufacturing and 620 (62.7%) were in construction. The number of jobs in the tertiary sector was 2,075. In the tertiary sector; 432 or 20.8% were in wholesale or retail sales or the repair of motor vehicles, 178 or 8.6% were in the movement and storage of goods, 540 or 26.0% were in a hotel or restaurant, 19 or 0.9% were in the information industry, 78 or 3.8% were the insurance or financial industry, 158 or 7.6% were technical professionals or scientists, 139 or 6.7% were in education and 123 or 5.9% were in health care.

In 2000, there were 590 workers who commuted into the municipality and 501 workers who commuted away. The municipality is a net importer of workers, with about 1.2 workers entering the municipality for every one leaving. Of the working population, 10.4% used public transportation to get to work, and 53.8% used a private car.

== Religion ==
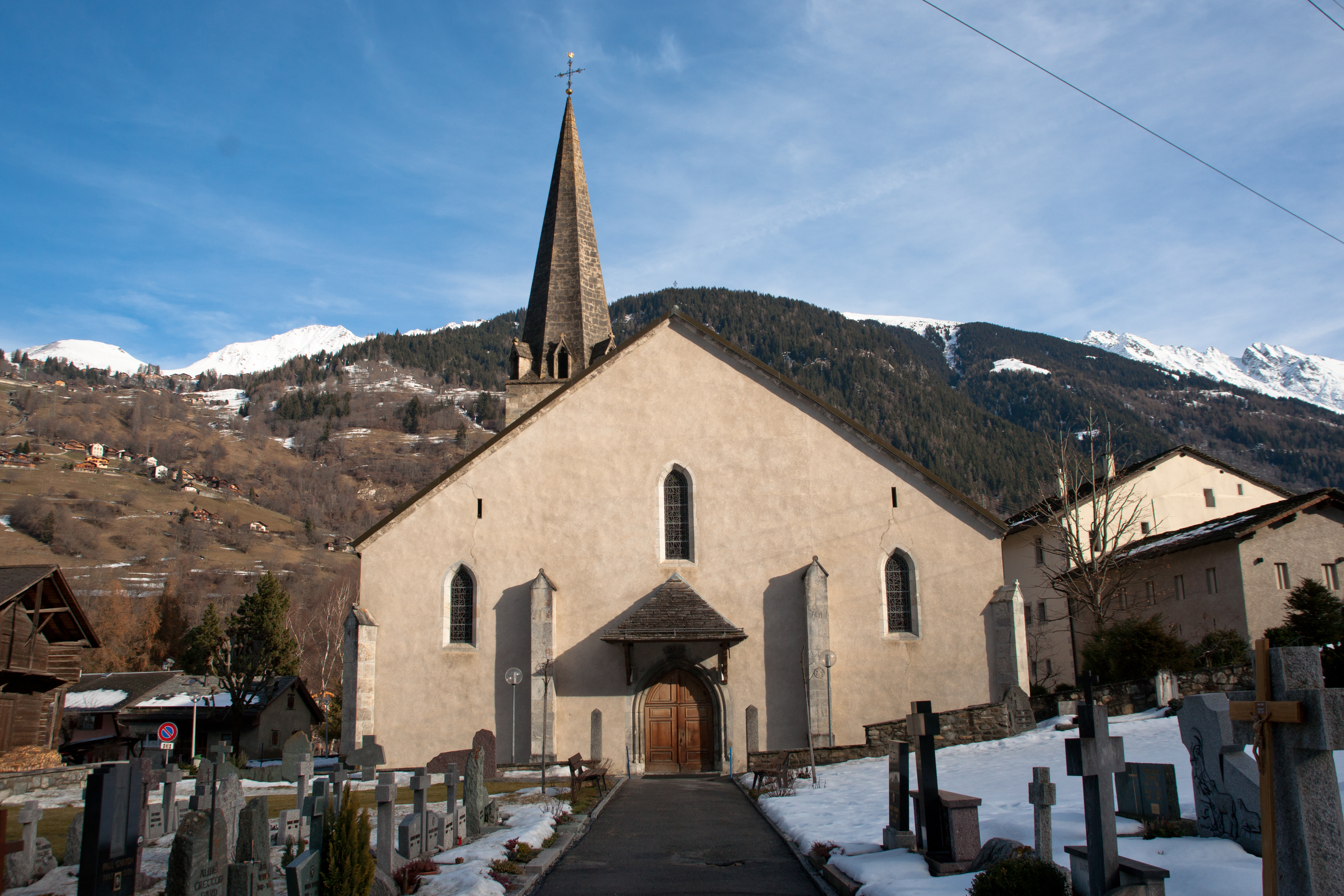
Church of St-Maurice in Le Châble

From the 2000 census, 5,169 or 79.1% were Roman Catholic, while 430 or 6.6% belonged to the Swiss Reformed Church. Of the rest of the population, there were 43 members of an Orthodox church (or about 0.66% of the population), there were 3 individuals (or about 0.05% of the population) who belonged to the Christian Catholic Church, and there were 38 individuals (or about 0.58% of the population) who belonged to another Christian church. There were 13 individuals (or about 0.20% of the population) who were Jewish, and 40 (or about 0.61% of the population) who were Islamic. There were 5 individuals who were Buddhist, 2 individuals who were Hindu and 6 individuals who belonged to another church. 435 (or about 6.66% of the population) belonged to no church, are agnostic or atheist, and 364 individuals (or about 5.57% of the population) did not answer the question.

== Education ==
In Bagnes about 2,361 or (36.1%) of the population have completed non-mandatory upper secondary education, and 720 or (11.0%) have completed additional higher education (either university or a Fachhochschule). Of the 720 who completed tertiary schooling, 43.6% were Swiss men, 24.2% were Swiss women, 18.8% were non-Swiss men and 13.5% were non-Swiss women.

As of 2000, there were 67 students in Bagnes who came from another municipality, while 166 residents attended schools outside the municipality.

== Transport ==
The municipality has a railway station, Le Châble VS, on the Martigny–Orsières line.

== Notable people ==
- Francis A. Deleglise (1835–1894), founder of Antigo, Wisconsin, was born in Bagnes
- Roland Collombin, two-time World Cup downhill champion and Olympic silver medalist, born and still lives in Versegères
- Marie Troillet, Swiss ski mountaineer, was born in Bagnes
- Joseph Vaudan (1925 - 2008), Catholic priest responsible for the birth of commercial wine making in Valle d'Aosta
