= Bourg-Saint-Pierre =

- Municipality
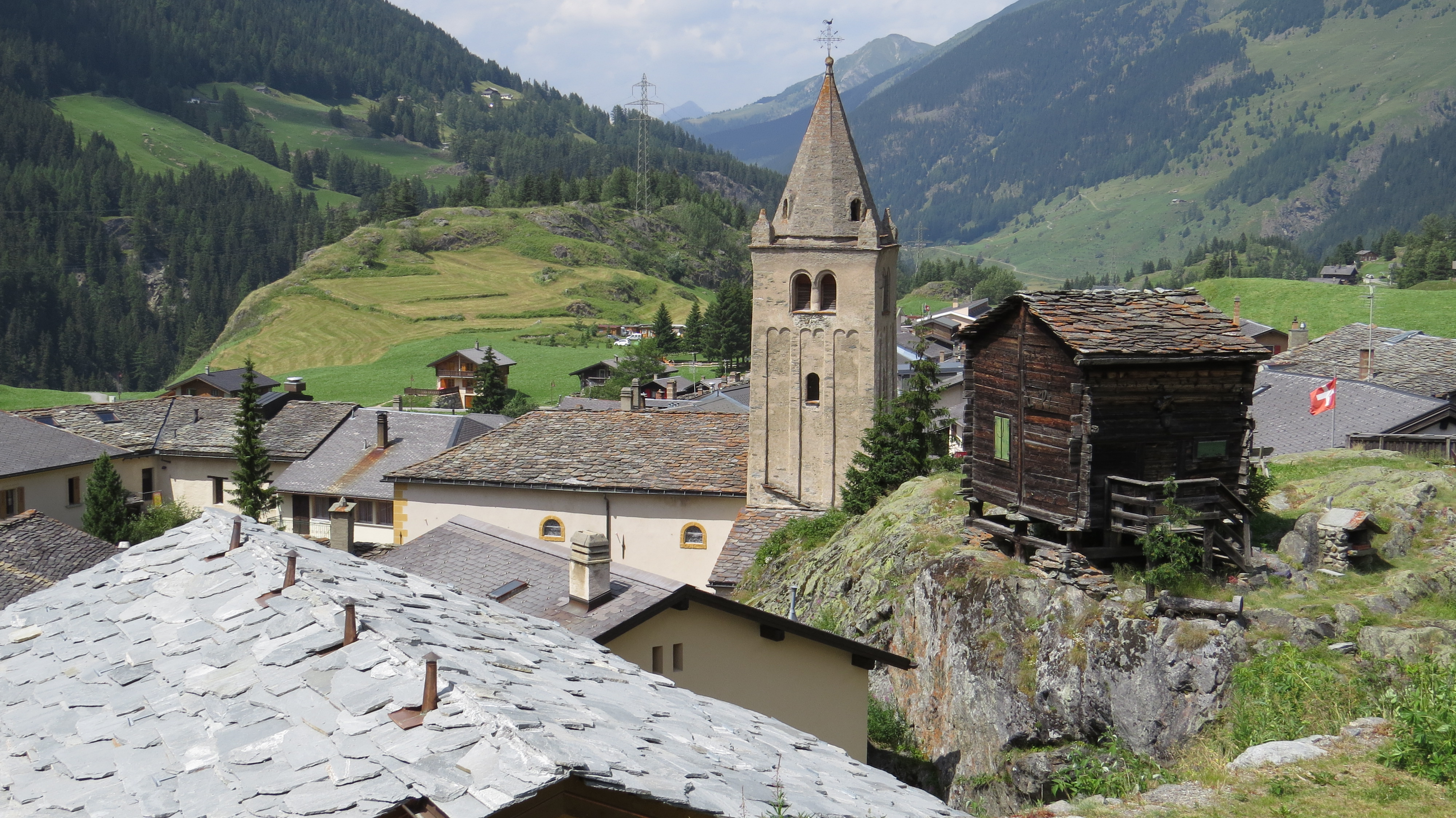
- Bourg-Saint-Pierre with the church of St-Pierre

- Flag Coat of arms
- Location of Bourg-Saint-Pierre
- Location within Switzerland Location within Canton of Valais
- Coordinates: 45°57′N 7°12′E
- Country: Switzerland
- Canton: Valais
- District: Entremont

Area
  - Total: 90.1 km^{2} (34.8 sq mi)
- Elevation: 1,632 m (5,354 ft)

Population (December 2002)
  - Total: 204
  - Density: 2.26/km^{2} (5.86/sq mi)
- Time zone: UTC+01:00 (CET)
  - Summer (DST): UTC+02:00 (CEST)
- Postal code: 1946
- SFOS number: 6032
- ISO 3166 code: CH-VS
- Surrounded by: Bagnes, Etroubles (IT-AO), Liddes, Ollomont (IT-AO), Orsières, Saint-Oyen (IT-AO), Saint-Rhémy-en-Bosses (IT-AO)
- Website: www.bourg-saint-pierre.ch

Bourg-Saint-Pierre (French pronunciation: [buʁ sɛ̃ pjɛʁ]; Arpitan: Lo Bôrg) is a municipality in the district of Entremont in the canton of Valais in Switzerland. Bourg-Saint-Pierre is the highest inhabited locality of the valley and the last village when ascending the Great Saint Bernard Pass. It is home to Jardin alpin La Linnaea.

== History ==
Bourg-Saint-Pierre is first mentioned in 1125 as Burgus Sancti Petri. In medieval times, it was a stage on the Via Francigena. A 1693 map of the Valais refers to Bourg-Saint-Pierre as "S Pierre". A 1799 map of the Helvetic Republic shows the town as "Saint Petersburg".

== Geography ==
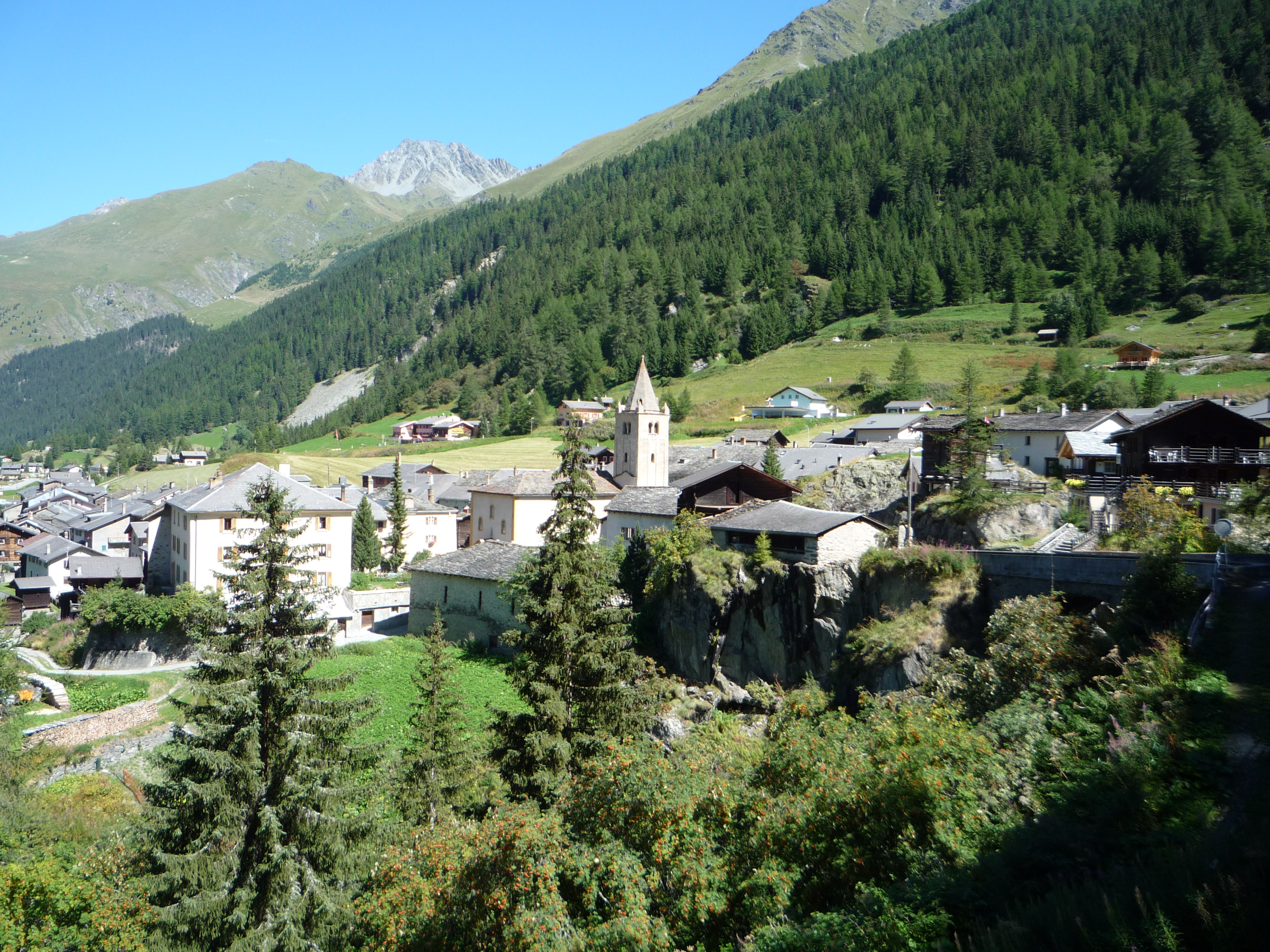
Bourg-Saint-Pierre from the Great Saint Bernard road

Bourg-Saint-Pierre has an area, as of 2011, of 90.2 square kilometers (34.8 mi^{2}). Of this area, 29.1% is used for agricultural purposes, while 6.8% is forested. Of the rest of the land, 0.6% is settled (buildings or roads) and 63.5% is unproductive land.

The municipality is located on the Italian border. It consists of the village of Bourg-Saint-Pierre and the Hospice du Grand Saint-Bernard in the Great St Bernard Pass.

The village of Bourg-Saint-Pierre lies at the foot of the Grand Combin.

== Coat of arms ==
The blazon of the municipal coat of arms is Azure, two Keys Or in saltire. The two keys are probably a reference to the keys of Saint Peter.

== Demographics ==
Bourg-Saint-Pierre has a population (as of December 2020) of 211. As of 2008, 6.7% of the population are resident foreign nationals. Over the last 10 years (1999–2009) the population has changed at a rate of -10.9%. It has changed at a rate of -12.9% due to migration and at a rate of 3.5% due to births and deaths.

Most of the population (as of 2000) speaks French (195 or 92.0%) as their first language, Italian is the second most common (6 or 2.8%) and Portuguese is the third (6 or 2.8%). There are 2 people who speak German.

Of the population in the municipality 101 or about 47.6% were born in Bourg-Saint-Pierre and lived there in 2000. There were 52 or 24.5% who were born in the same canton, while 21 or 9.9% were born somewhere else in Switzerland, and 36 or 17.0% were born outside of Switzerland.

The age distribution of the population (as of 2000) is children and teenagers (0–19 years old) make up 22.6% of the population, while adults (20–64 years old) make up 62.7% and seniors (over 64 years old) make up 14.6%.

As of 2000, there were 86 people who were single and never married in the municipality. There were 112 married individuals, 13 widows or widowers and 1 individuals who are divorced.

As of 2000, there were 77 private households in the municipality, and an average of 2.5 persons per household. There were 17 households that consist of only one person and 8 households with five or more people. Out of a total of 80 households that answered this question, 21.3% were households made up of just one person. Of the rest of the households, there are 30 married couples without children, 25 married couples with children. There were 4 single parents with a child or children. There was 1 household that was made up of unrelated people and 3 households that were made up of some sort of institution or another collective housing.

In 2000 there were 81 single family homes (or 57.9% of the total) out of a total of 140 inhabited buildings. There were 28 multi-family buildings (20.0%), along with 7 multi-purpose buildings that were mostly used for housing (5.0%) and 24 other use buildings (commercial or industrial) that also had some housing (17.1%).

In 2000, a total of 69 apartments (35.9% of the total) were permanently occupied, while 112 apartments (58.3%) were seasonally occupied and 11 apartments (5.7%) were empty. The vacancy rate for the municipality, in 2010, was 3.61%.

Historical population

| Year | Pop. | ±% p.a. |
|---|---|---|
| 1850 | 305 | — |
| 1860 | 336 | +0.97% |
| 1870 | 400 | +1.76% |
| 1880 | 392 | −0.20% |
| 1888 | 393 | +0.03% |
| 1900 | 355 | −0.84% |

| Year | Pop. | ±% p.a. |
|---|---|---|
| 1910 | 327 | −0.82% |
| 1920 | 271 | −1.86% |
| 1930 | 266 | −0.19% |
| 1941 | 295 | +0.95% |
| 1950 | 227 | −2.87% |
| 1960 | 524 | +8.73% |

| Year | Pop. | ±% p.a. |
|---|---|---|
| 1970 | 236 | −7.67% |
| 1980 | 218 | −0.79% |
| 1990 | 200 | −0.86% |
| 2000 | 212 | +0.58% |

== Heritage sites of national significance ==
The Catholic church of St-Pierre with its romanesque tower and the Hospice with its outbuildings are listed as Swiss heritage site of national significance. The entire city of Bourg-Saint-Pierre and the Grand-Saint-Bernard area are part of the Inventory of Swiss Heritage Sites.

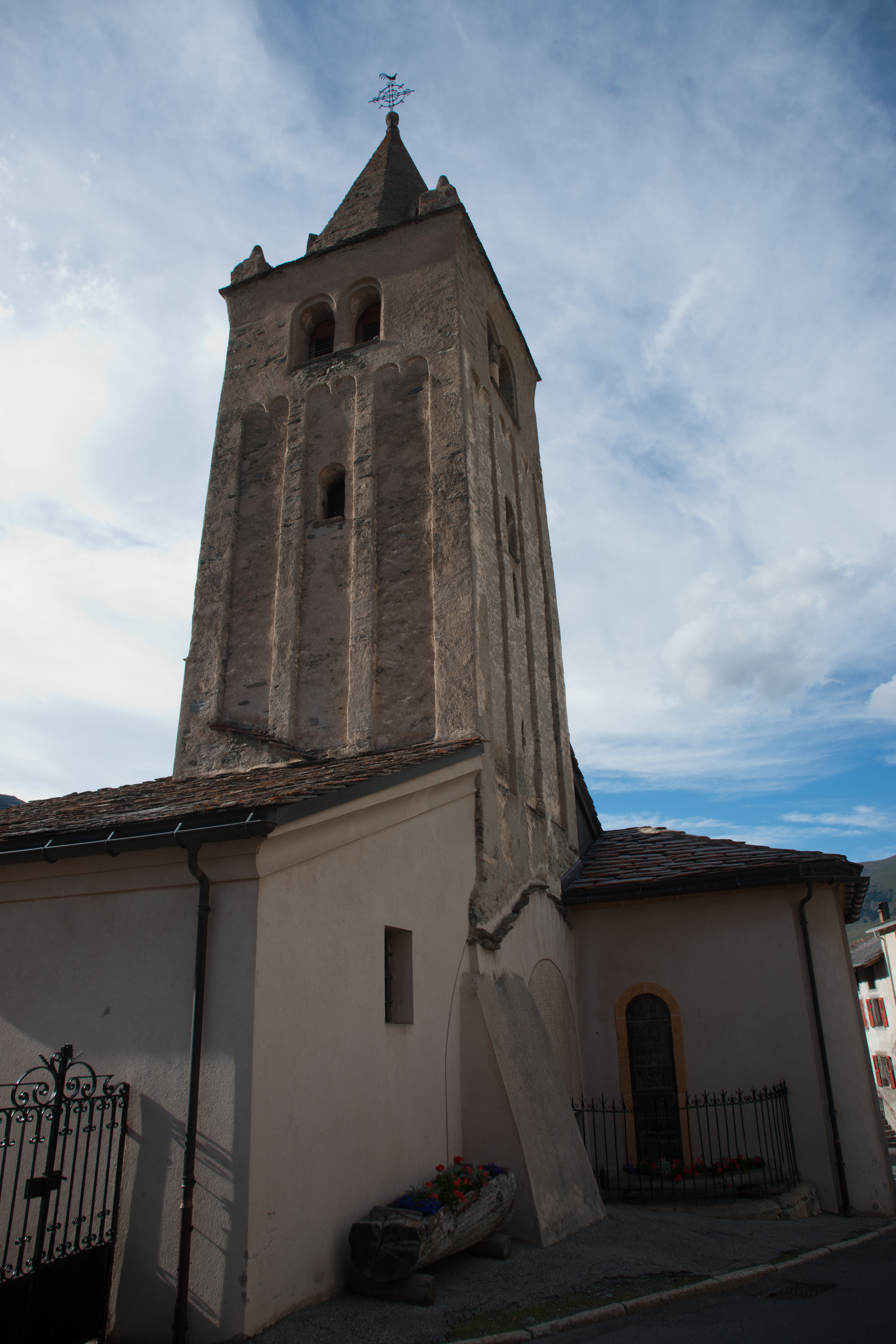
Church of St-Pierre

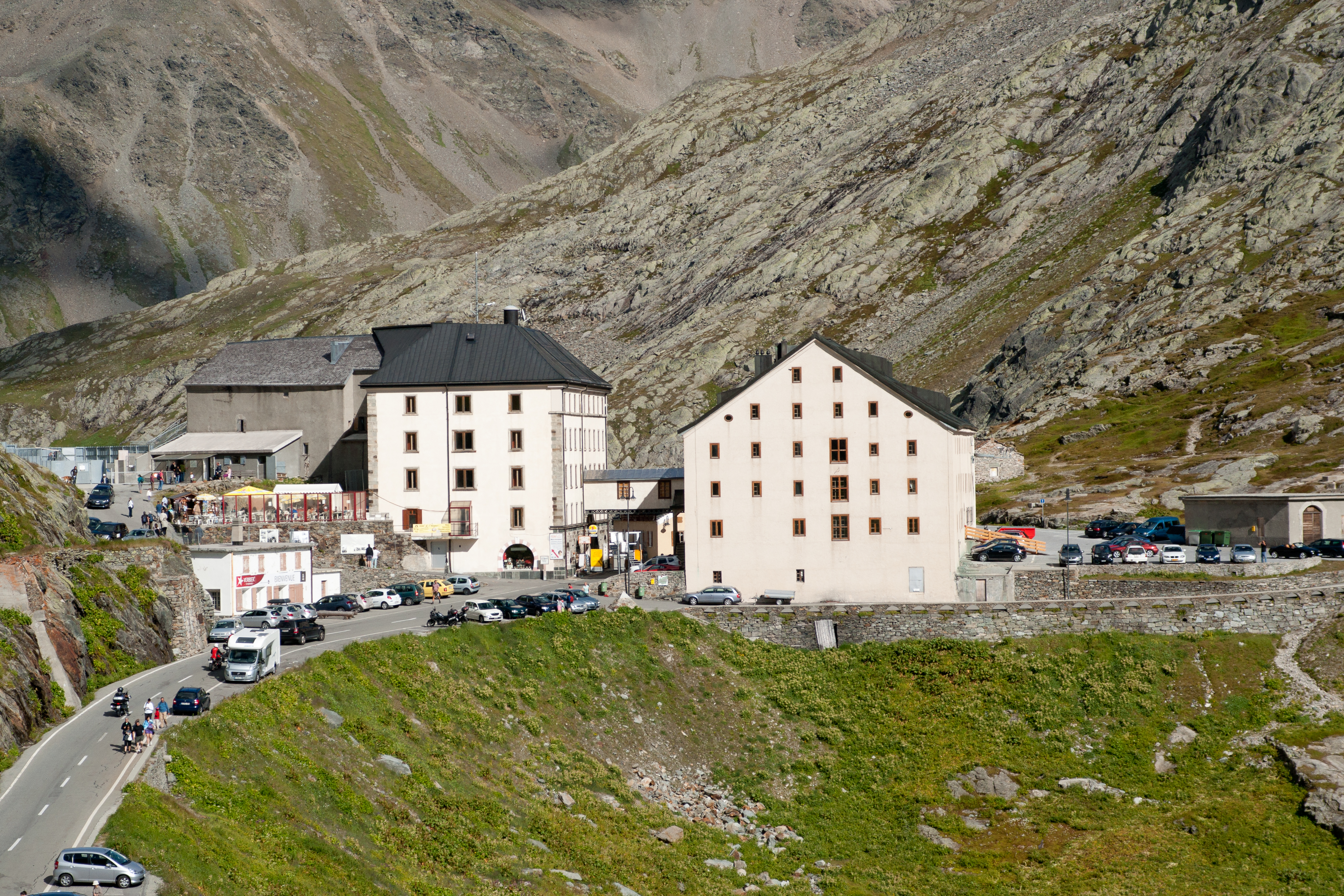
Hospice du Grand Saint-Bernard

== Politics ==
In the 2007 federal election the most popular party was the FDP which received 43.42% of the vote. The next three most popular parties were the CVP (27.35%), the SVP (15.05%) and the SP (11.14%). In the federal election, a total of 109 votes were cast, and the voter turnout was 64.9%.

== Economy ==
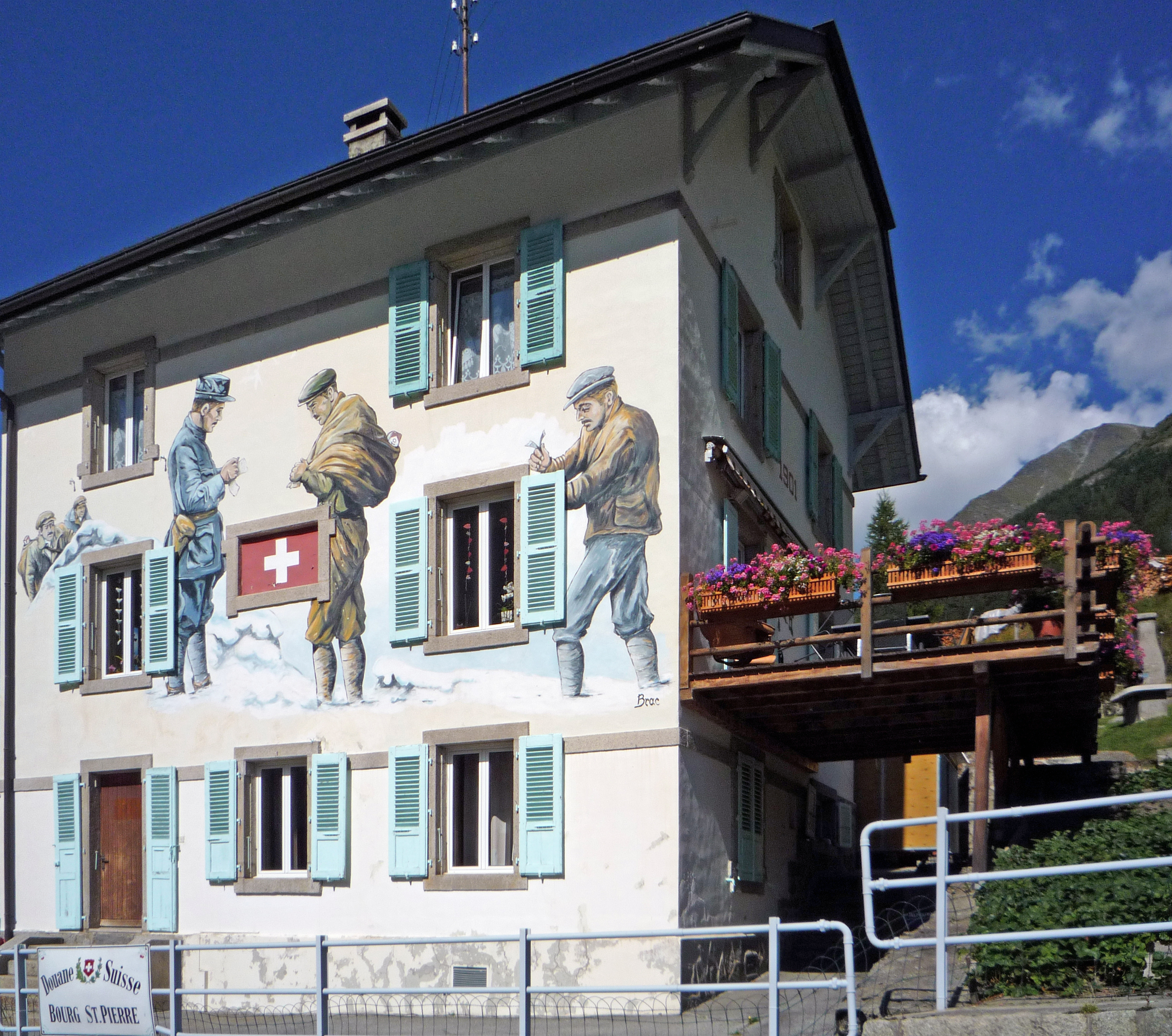
Painted wall of the old Swiss Customs depicting smuggling across the Great Saint Bernard Pass

As of 2010, Bourg-Saint-Pierre had an unemployment rate of 1.7%. As of 2008, there were 3 people employed in the primary economic sector and about 2 businesses involved in this sector. No one was employed in the secondary sector. 130 people were employed in the tertiary sector, with 19 businesses in this sector. There were 93 residents of the municipality who were employed in some capacity, of which women made up 43.0% of the workforce.

In 2008 the total number of full-time equivalent jobs was 120. The number of jobs in the primary sector was 2, all of which were in agriculture. There were no jobs in the secondary sector. The number of jobs in the tertiary sector was 118. In the tertiary sector; 4 or 3.4% were in wholesale or retail sales or the repair of motor vehicles, 46 or 39.0% were in the movement and storage of goods, 54 or 45.8% were in a hotel or restaurant.

In 2000, there were 41 workers who commuted into the municipality and 17 workers who commuted away. The municipality is a net importer of workers, with about 2.4 workers entering the municipality for every one leaving. Of the working population, 2.2% used public transportation to get to work, and 51.6% used a private car.

== Religion ==
From the 2000 census, 181 or 85.4% were Roman Catholic, while 9 or 4.2% belonged to the Swiss Reformed Church. Of the rest of the population, there were 3 members of an Orthodox church (or about 1.42% of the population). There was 1 individual who was Islamic. There were 1 individual who belonged to another church. 13 (or about 6.13% of the population) belonged to no church, are agnostic or atheist, and 4 individuals (or about 1.89% of the population) did not answer the question.

== Education ==
In Bourg-Saint-Pierre about 68 or (32.1%) of the population have completed non-mandatory upper secondary education, and 14 or (6.6%) have completed additional higher education (either university or a Fachhochschule). Of the 14 who completed tertiary schooling, 57.1% were Swiss men, 14.3% were Swiss women.

As of 2000, there were 2 students in Bourg-Saint-Pierre who came from another municipality, while 5 residents attended schools outside the municipality.

== Ski resort ==
From 1963 to 2010, Bourg-Saint-Pierre was home to the Super St-Bernard ski resort, which operated three lifts reaching elevations up to 2,770 metres near the Swiss-Italian border.

The resort opened coinciding with the construction of the Great St Bernard Tunnel, providing year-round access to the historically significant mountain pass. Known for its reliable snowfall of 14 metres annually and challenging off-piste terrain, Super St-Bernard became a popular destination for freeriding enthusiasts, with one notable run extending across the border into Italy. Despite its reputation for excellent powder skiing, the remote location and extreme weather conditions—including frequent high winds exceeding 60 km/h—contributed to operational challenges and high maintenance costs.

The resort permanently closed in 2010 following financial difficulties and the inability to fund necessary infrastructure upgrades, becoming one of Switzerland's notable "ghost resorts" that continues to attract ski touring enthusiasts to its abandoned slopes.
