= Liddes =

- Municipality
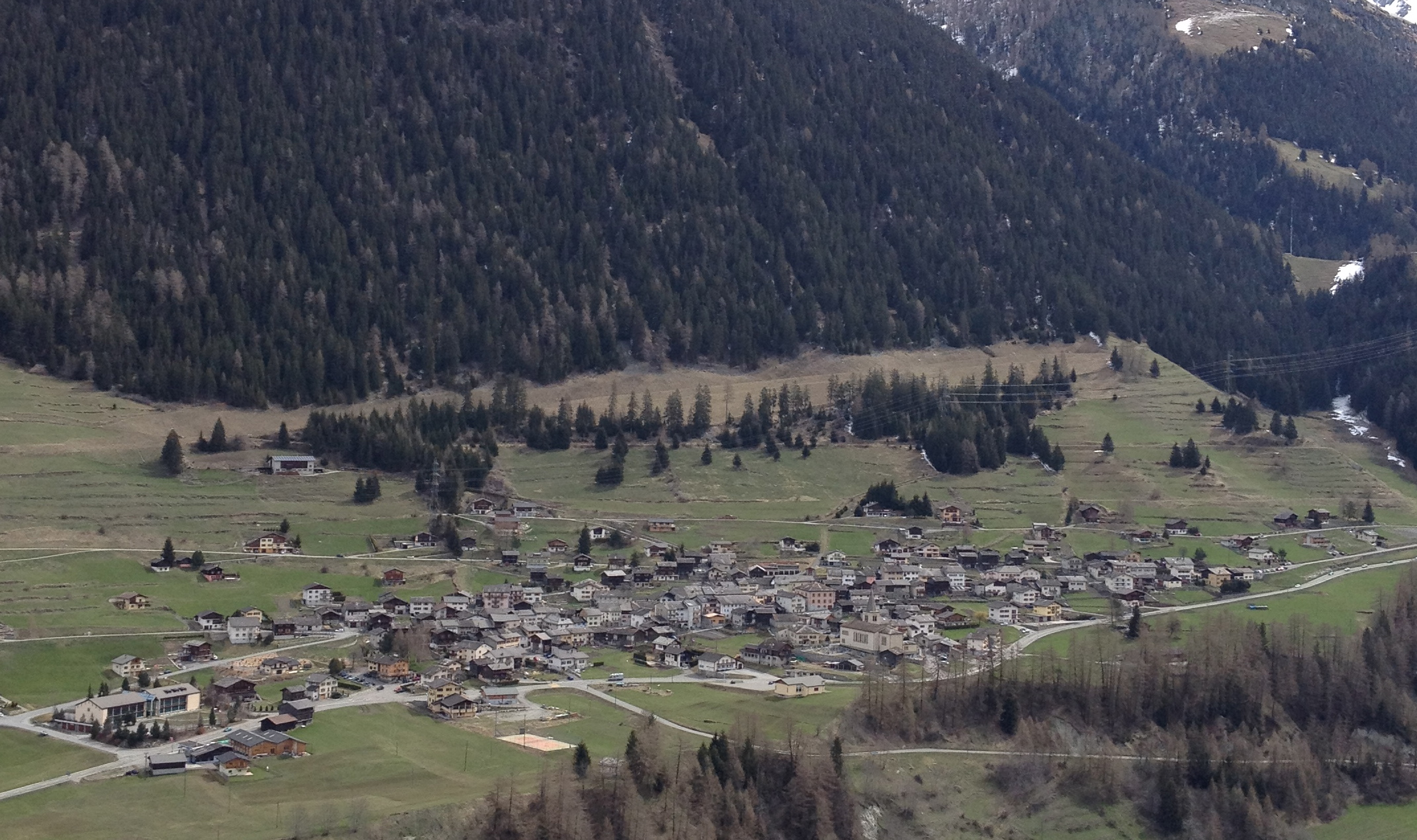
- Liddes

- Flag Coat of arms
- Location of Liddes
- Location within Switzerland Location within Canton of Valais
- Coordinates: 45°59′N 7°11′E
- Country: Switzerland
- Canton: Valais
- District: Entremont

Government
  - Mayor: Jean-Laurent Darbellay

Area
  - Total: 60.2 km^{2} (23.2 sq mi)
- Elevation: 1,346 m (4,416 ft)

Population (December 2002)
  - Total: 724
  - Density: 12.0/km^{2} (31.1/sq mi)
- Time zone: UTC+01:00 (CET)
  - Summer (DST): UTC+02:00 (CEST)
- Postal code: 1945
- SFOS number: 6033
- ISO 3166 code: CH-VS
- Surrounded by: Bagnes, Bourg-Saint-Pierre, Orsières
- Website: https://www.liddes.ch SFSO statistics

Liddes is a municipality in the district of Entremont in the canton of Valais in Switzerland.

== History ==
Liddes is first mentioned in 1177 as Leides.

Aerial view (1946)

== Geography ==
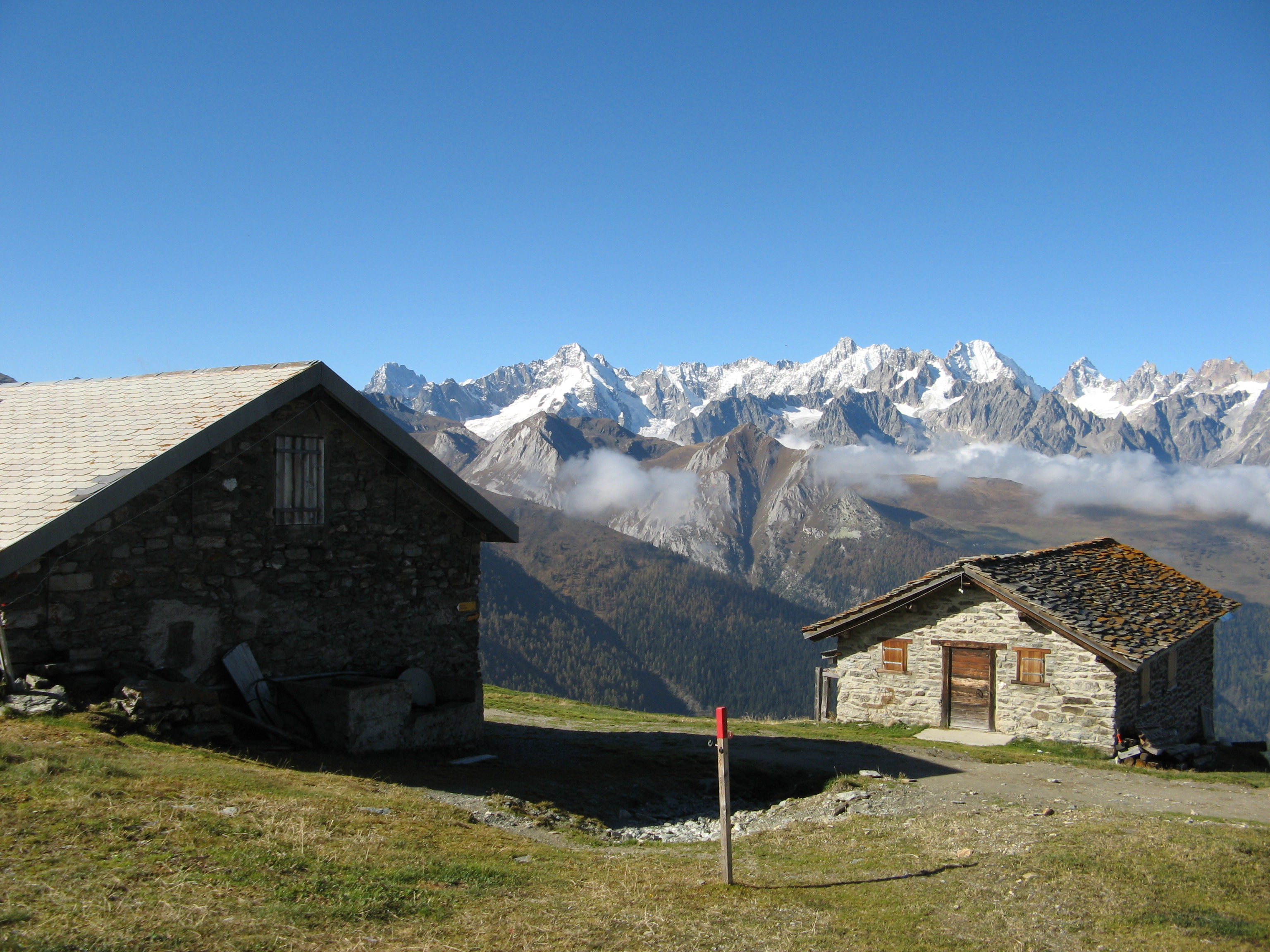
Le Coeur above Liddes

Liddes has an area, as of 2011, of 60.2 square kilometers (23.2 mi^{2}). Of this area, 33.4% is used for agricultural purposes, while 23.8% is forested. Of the rest of the land, 1.3% is settled (buildings or roads) and 41.5% is unproductive land.

It lies north of Bourg-Saint-Pierre and north-west of the Grand Combin.

The municipality is located on the road over the Great St Bernard Pass. It consists of a number of hamlets including Liddes-Ville, Chandonne, Fontaine, Rive-Haute, Drance, Fornex, Les Moulins, Vichères, Chez-Petit and Palasui.

== Coat of arms ==
The blazon of the municipal coat of arms is Gules, St. George armoured Azure haloed Or riding a Horse Argent killing the Dragon Vert.

== Demographics ==
Liddes has a population (as of December 2020) of 735. As of 2008, 6.7% of the population are resident foreign nationals. Over the last 10 years (1999–2009) the population has changed at a rate of 8.7%. It has changed at a rate of 10% due to migration and at a rate of 1.2% due to births and deaths.

Most of the population (as of 2000) speaks French (648 or 98.3%) as their first language, German is the second most common (5 or 0.8%) and Portuguese is the third (3 or 0.5%).

As of 2008, the gender distribution of the population was 50.9% male and 49.1% female. The population was made up of 357 Swiss men (47.4% of the population) and 26 (3.5%) non-Swiss men. There were 341 Swiss women (45.3%) and 29 (3.9%) non-Swiss women. Of the population in the municipality 447 or about 67.8% were born in Liddes and lived there in 2000. There were 99 or 15.0% who were born in the same canton, while 59 or 9.0% were born somewhere else in Switzerland, and 33 or 5.0% were born outside of Switzerland.

The age distribution of the population (as of 2000) is children and teenagers (0–19 years old) make up 26.9% of the population, while adults (20–64 years old) make up 53.9% and seniors (over 64 years old) make up 19.3%.

As of 2000, there were 279 people who were single and never married in the municipality. There were 318 married individuals, 47 widows or widowers and 15 individuals who are divorced.

As of 2000, there were 255 private households in the municipality, and an average of 2.5 persons per household. There were 79 households that consist of only one person and 40 households with five or more people. Out of a total of 261 households that answered this question, 30.3% were households made up of just one person and there were 7 adults who lived with their parents. Of the rest of the households, there are 66 married couples without children, 89 married couples with children. There were 11 single parents with a child or children. There were 3 households that were made up of unrelated people and 6 households that were made up of some sort of institution or another collective housing.

In 2000 there were 281 single family homes (or 72.2% of the total) out of a total of 389 inhabited buildings. There were 53 multi-family buildings (13.6%), along with 39 multi-purpose buildings that were mostly used for housing (10.0%) and 16 other use buildings (commercial or industrial) that also had some housing (4.1%).

In 2000, a total of 243 apartments (52.4% of the total) were permanently occupied, while 189 apartments (40.7%) were seasonally occupied and 32 apartments (6.9%) were empty. As of 2009, the construction rate of new housing units was 2.7 new units per 1000 residents. The vacancy rate for the municipality, in 2010, was 1%.

Historical population

Year	Pop.	±% p.a.
1802	1,243	—
1850	1,347	+0.17%
1860	1,308	−0.29%
1870	1,237	−0.56%
1880	1,267	+0.24%
1888	1,189	−0.79%

Year	Pop.	±% p.a.
1900	1,076	−0.83%
1910	1,079	+0.03%
1920	983	−0.93%
1930	832	−1.65%
1941	824	−0.09%
1950	720	−1.49%

Year	Pop.	±% p.a.
1960	713	−0.10%
1970	635	−1.15%
1980	639	+0.06%
1990	620	−0.30%
2000	659	+0.61%

== Heritage sites of national significance ==
The Les Moulins is listed as a Swiss heritage site of national significance. The entire village of Liddes is part of the Inventory of Swiss Heritage Sites.

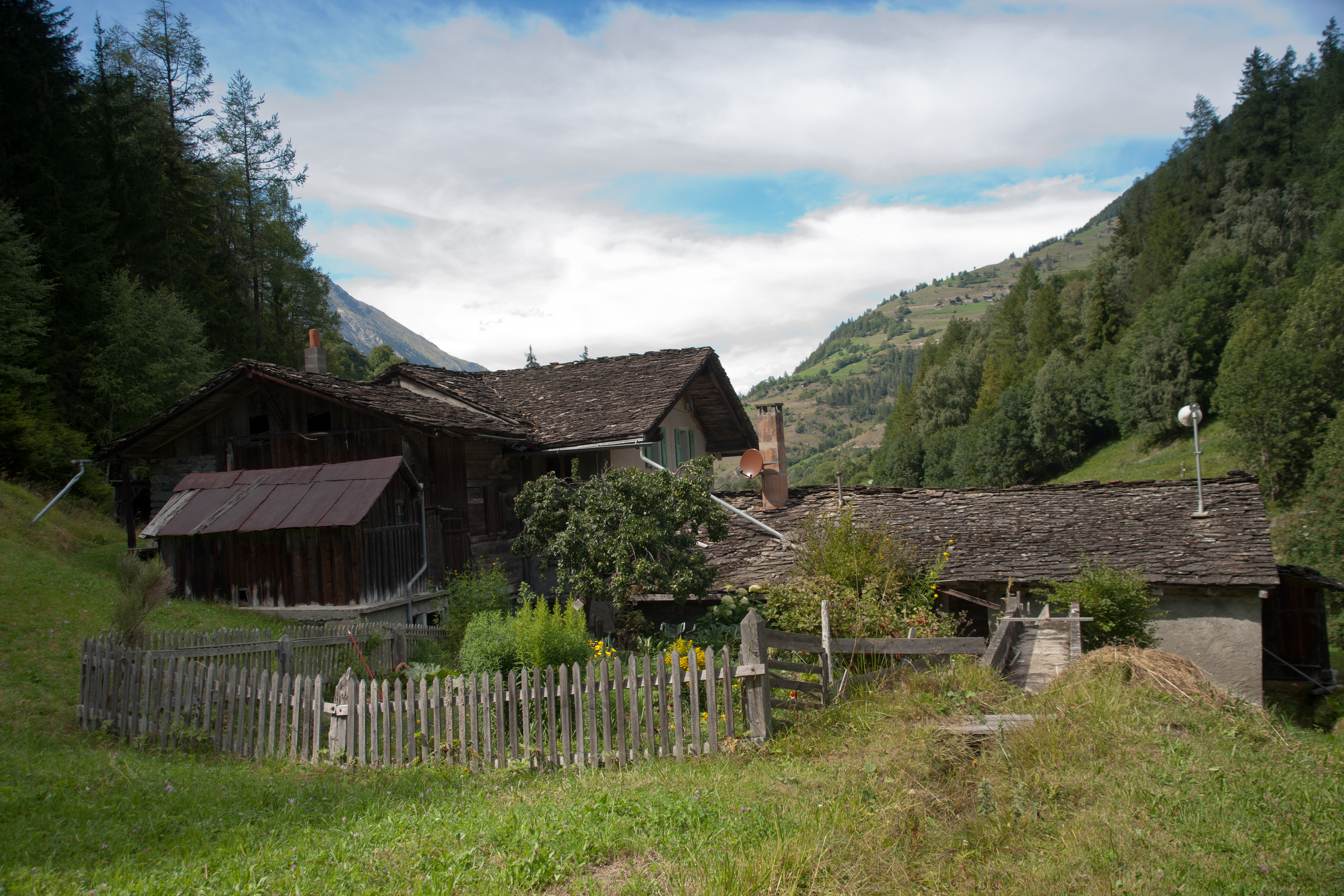
Exterior of the mill

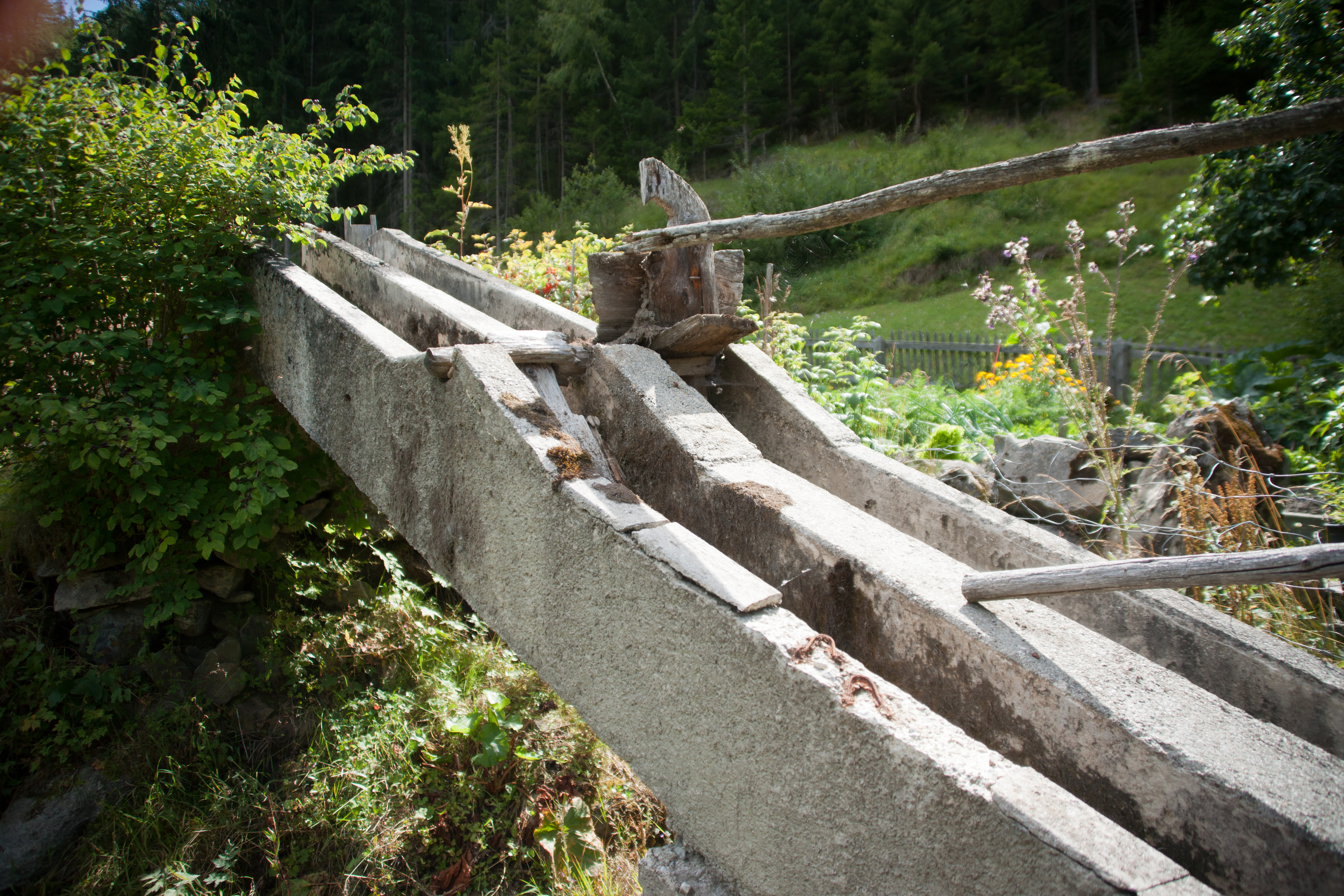
Waterway to power the mill

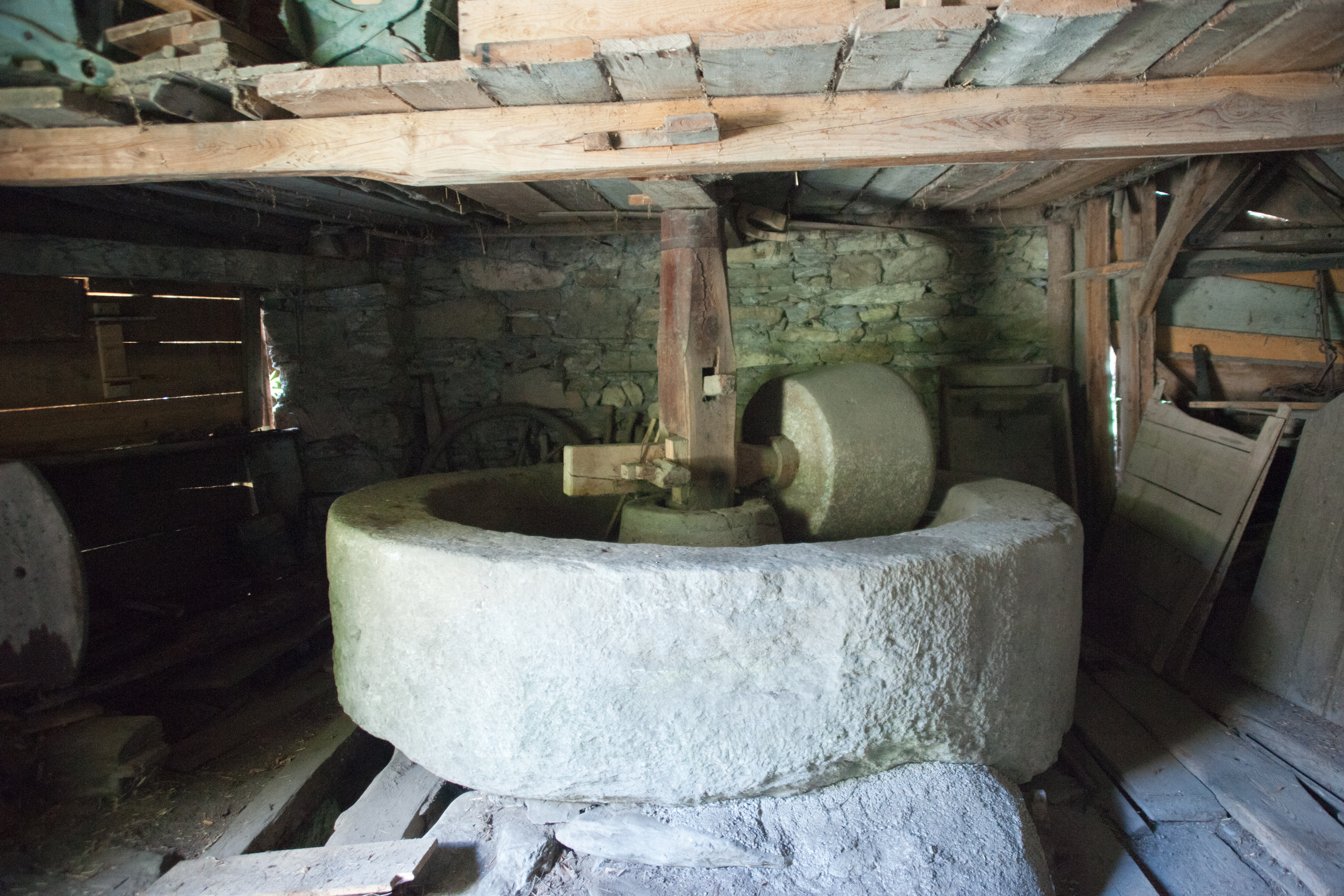
Mill stone

== Politics ==
In the 2007 federal election the most popular party was the CVP which received 57% of the vote. The next three most popular parties were the FDP (20.91%), the SVP (9.75%) and the SP (8.99%). In the federal election, a total of 354 votes were cast, and the voter turnout was 66.7%.

In the 2009 Conseil d'État/Staatsrat election a total of 382 votes were cast, of which 16 or about 4.2% were invalid. The voter participation was 73.3%, which is much more than the cantonal average of 54.67%. In the 2007 Swiss Council of States election a total of 340 votes were cast, of which 26 or about 7.6% were invalid. The voter participation was 65.8%, which is much more than the cantonal average of 59.88%.

== Economy ==
As of 2010, Liddes had an unemployment rate of 2.6%. As of 2008, there were 66 people employed in the primary economic sector and about 23 businesses involved in this sector. 34 people were employed in the secondary sector and there were 10 businesses in this sector. 86 people were employed in the tertiary sector, with 18 businesses in this sector. There were 273 residents of the municipality who were employed in some capacity, of which females made up 34.4% of the workforce.

In 2008 the total number of full-time equivalent jobs was 135. The number of jobs in the primary sector was 37, of which 36 were in agriculture and were in fishing or fisheries. The number of jobs in the secondary sector was 32 of which 14 or (43.8%) were in manufacturing and 10 (31.3%) were in construction. The number of jobs in the tertiary sector was 66. In the tertiary sector; 6 or 9.1% were in wholesale or retail sales or the repair of motor vehicles, 8 or 12.1% were in the movement and storage of goods, 12 or 18.2% were in a hotel or restaurant, 1 was the insurance or financial industry, 11 or 16.7% were technical professionals or scientists, 5 or 7.6% were in education.

In 2000, there were 6 workers who commuted into the municipality and 149 workers who commuted away. The municipality is a net exporter of workers, with about 24.8 workers leaving the municipality for every one entering. Of the working population, 8.1% used public transportation to get to work, and 69.2% used a private car.

== Religion ==
From the 2000 census, 593 or 90.0% were Roman Catholic, while 22 or 3.3% belonged to the Swiss Reformed Church. Of the rest of the population, there were 2 members of an Orthodox church (or about 0.30% of the population), and there was 1 individual who belongs to another Christian church. 17 (or about 2.58% of the population) belonged to no church, are agnostic or atheist, and 24 individuals (or about 3.64% of the population) did not answer the question.

== Education ==
In Liddes about 227 or (34.4%) of the population have completed non-mandatory upper secondary education, and 35 or (5.3%) have completed additional higher education (either university or a Fachhochschule). Of the 35 who completed tertiary schooling, 62.9% were Swiss men, 28.6% were Swiss women.

As of 2000, there were 6 students in Liddes who came from another municipality, while 37 residents attended schools outside the municipality.
