= Vollèges =

- Former municipality
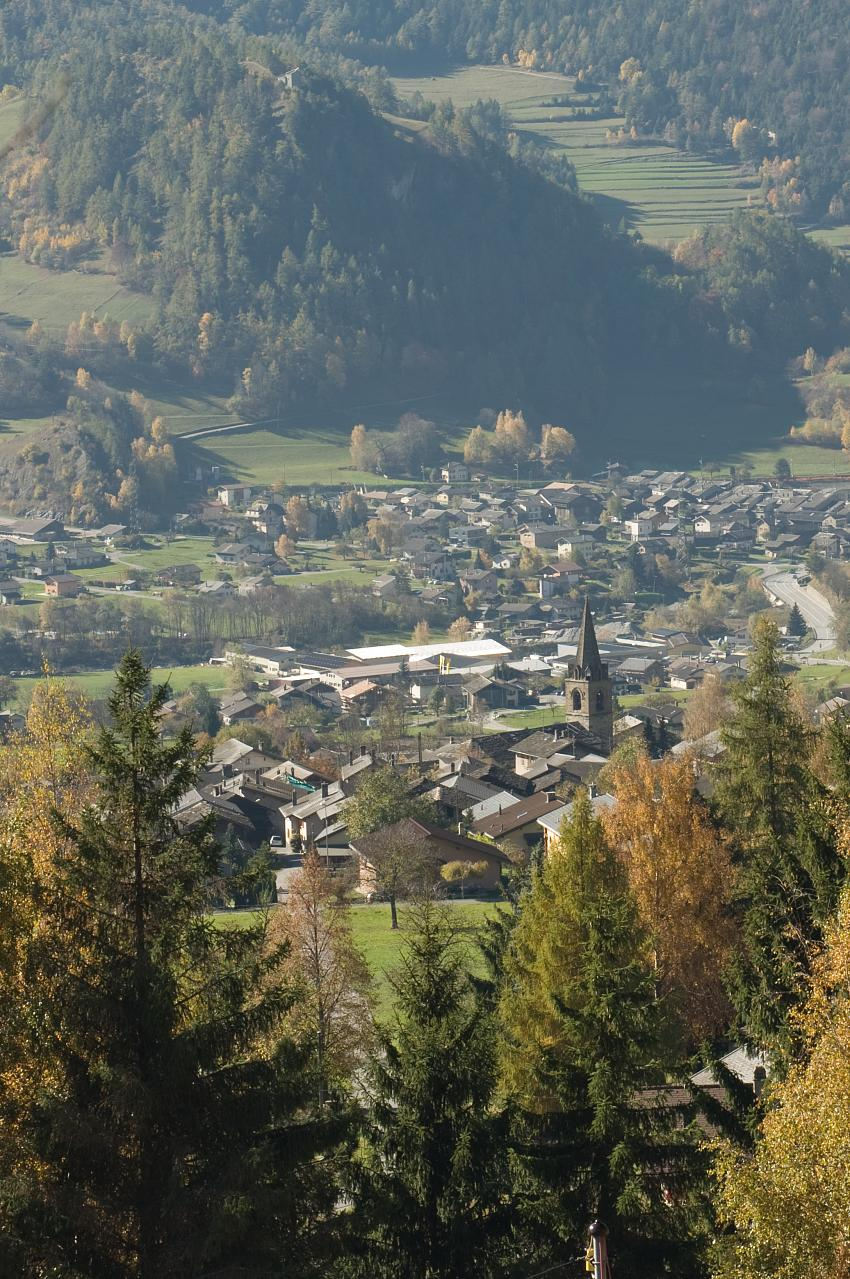

- Flag Coat of arms
- Location of Vollèges
- Location within Switzerland Location within Canton of Valais
- Coordinates: 46°5′N 7°10′E
- Country: Switzerland
- Canton: Valais
- District: Entremont

Government
  - Mayor: Christophe Maret

Area
  - Total: 17.9 km^{2} (6.9 sq mi)
- Elevation: 843 m (2,766 ft)

Population (December 2019)
  - Total: 2,041
  - Density: 114/km^{2} (295/sq mi)
- Time zone: UTC+01:00 (CET)
  - Summer (DST): UTC+02:00 (CEST)
- Postal code: 1941
- SFOS number: 6036
- ISO 3166 code: CH-VS
- Surrounded by: Bagnes, Bovernier, Charrat, Martigny, Saxon, Sembrancher
- Website: www.volleges.ch

Vollèges (French pronunciation: [vɔlɛʒ]) is a former municipality in the district of Entremont in the canton of Valais in Switzerland. On 1 January 2021 the former municipalities of Bagnes and Vollèges merged to form the new municipality of Val de Bagnes.

== Geography ==
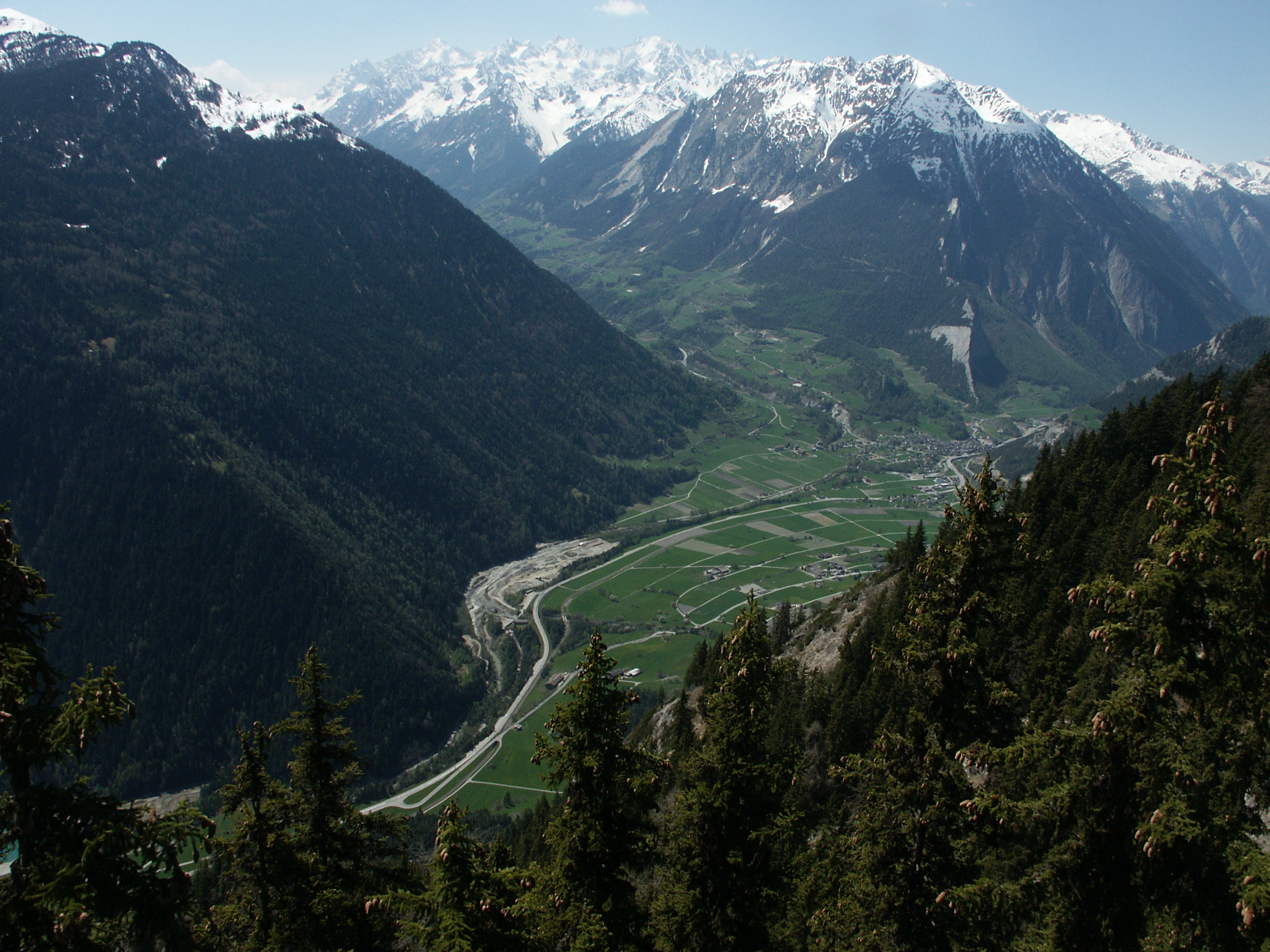
Sembracher and Vollèges villages

Vollèges had an area, as of 2011, of 17.9 square kilometers (6.9 mi^{2}). Of this area, 24.5% is used for agricultural purposes, while 56.1% is forested. Of the rest of the land, 6.1% is settled (buildings or roads) and 13.3% is unproductive land.

== Coat of arms ==
The blazon of the municipal coat of arms is Azure, on a base Vert a Pine tree eradicated Vert trunked and rooted Maroon in front of two cliffs Argent, in chief two Mullets of Five Or.

== Demographics ==
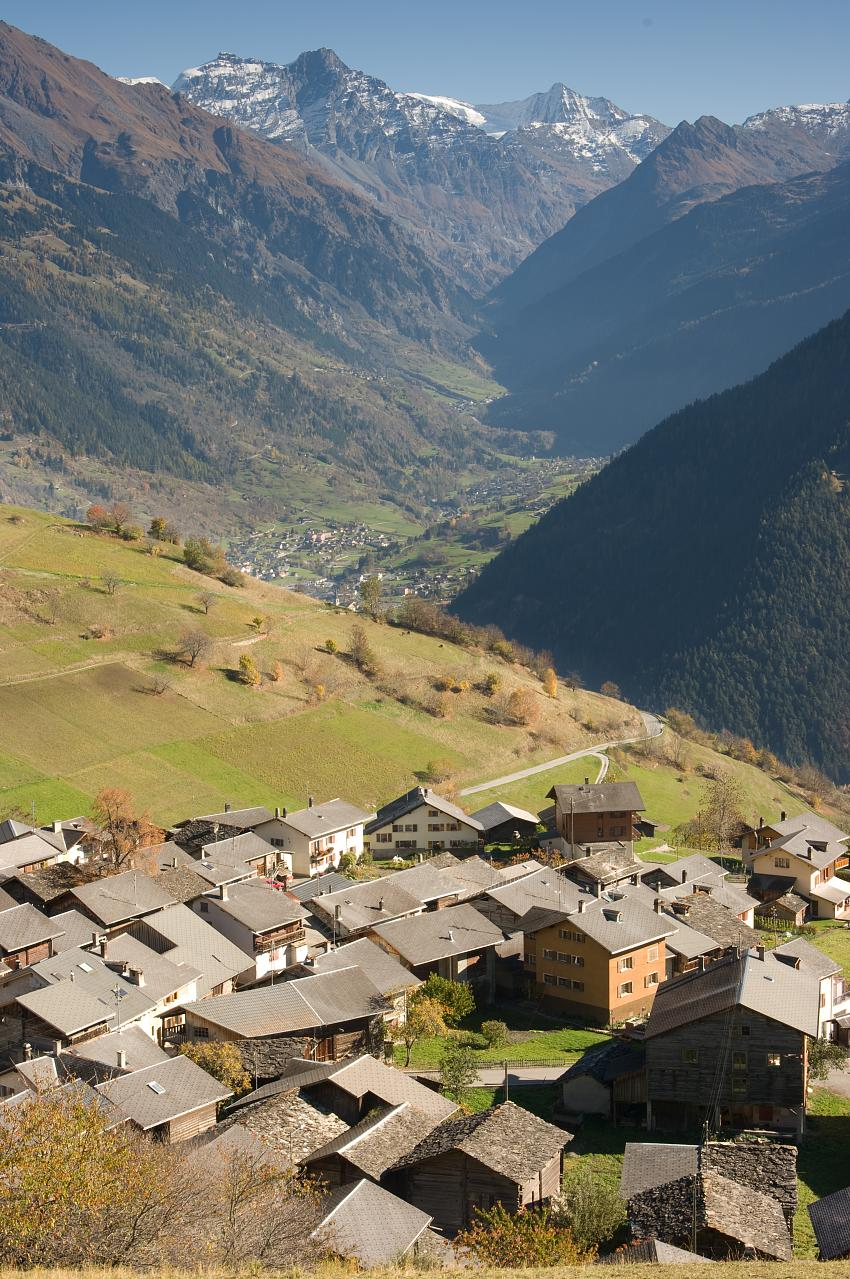
Levron village

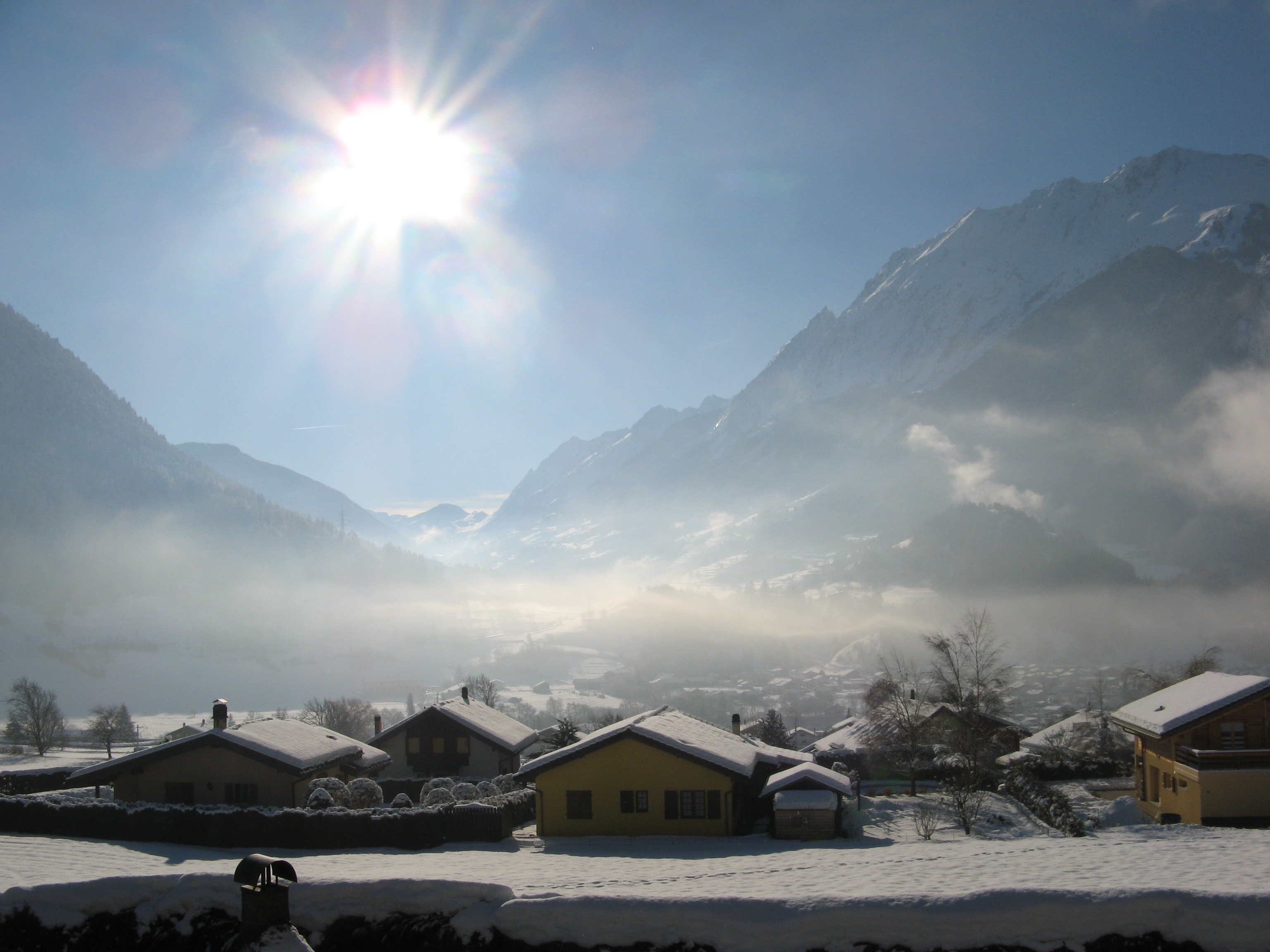
Vollèges town

Vollèges had a population (as of 2019) of 2,041. As of 2008, 5.1% of the population are resident foreign nationals. Over the last 10 years (1999–2009) the population has changed at a rate of 10.6%. It has changed at a rate of 10.3% due to migration and at a rate of 4.1% due to births and deaths.

Most of the population (as of 2000) speaks French (1,283 or 98.0%) as their first language, German is the second most common (12 or 0.9%) and Italian is the third (5 or 0.4%).

As of 2008, the gender distribution of the population was 50.1% male and 49.9% female. The population was made up of 730 Swiss men (47.1% of the population) and 46 (3.0%) non-Swiss men. There were 731 Swiss women (47.2%) and 43 (2.8%) non-Swiss women. Of the population in the municipality 835 or about 63.8% were born in Vollèges and lived there in 2000. There were 275 or 21.0% who were born in the same canton, while 111 or 8.5% were born somewhere else in Switzerland, and 64 or 4.9% were born outside of Switzerland.

The age distribution of the population (as of 2000) is children and teenagers (0–19 years old) make up 30.3% of the population, while adults (20–64 years old) make up 54.5% and seniors (over 64 years old) make up 15.2%.

As of 2000, there were 568 people who were single and never married in the municipality. There were 646 married individuals, 65 widows or widowers and 30 individuals who are divorced.

As of 2000, there were 440 private households in the municipality, and an average of 2.9 persons per household. There were 91 households that consist of only one person and 83 households with five or more people. Out of a total of 447 households that answered this question, 20.4% were households made up of just one person and there were 7 adults who lived with their parents. Of the rest of the households, there are 106 married couples without children, 205 married couples with children There were 23 single parents with a child or children. There were 8 households that were made up of unrelated people and 7 households that were made up of some sort of institution or another collective housing.

In 2000 there were 444 single family homes (or 79.6% of the total) out of a total of 558 inhabited buildings. There were 72 multi-family buildings (12.9%), along with 28 multi-purpose buildings that were mostly used for housing (5.0%) and 14 other use buildings (commercial or industrial) that also had some housing (2.5%).

In 2000, a total of 431 apartments (65.3% of the total) were permanently occupied, while 197 apartments (29.8%) were seasonally occupied and 32 apartments (4.8%) were empty. As of 2009, the construction rate of new housing units was 3.2 new units per 1000 residents. The vacancy rate for the municipality, in 2010, was 0.26%.

The historical population is given in the following chart:

== Sights ==
The entire village of Vollèges and the hamlet of Vens are designated as part of the Inventory of Swiss Heritage Sites.

== Politics ==
In the 2007 federal election the most popular party was the CVP which received 62.24% of the vote. The next three most popular parties were the FDP (11.11%), the SP (9.82%) and the SVP (7.55%). In the federal election, a total of 671 votes were cast, and the voter turnout was 58.7%.

In the 2009 Conseil d'État/Staatsrat election a total of 587 votes were cast, of which 31 or about 5.3% were invalid. The voter participation was 52.5%, which is similar to the cantonal average of 54.67%. In the 2007 Swiss Council of States election a total of 647 votes were cast, of which 44 or about 6.8% were invalid. The voter participation was 58.3%, which is similar to the cantonal average of 59.88%.

== Economy ==
As of 2010, Vollèges had an unemployment rate of 3.3%. As of 2008, there were 103 people employed in the primary economic sector and about 39 businesses involved in this sector. 137 people were employed in the secondary sector and there were 22 businesses in this sector. 164 people were employed in the tertiary sector, with 35 businesses in this sector. There were 541 residents of the municipality who were employed in some capacity, of which females made up 37.2% of the workforce.

In 2008 the total number of full-time equivalent jobs was 308. The number of jobs in the primary sector was 46, all of which were in agriculture. The number of jobs in the secondary sector was 130 of which 80 or (61.5%) were in manufacturing and 46 (35.4%) were in construction. The number of jobs in the tertiary sector was 132. In the tertiary sector; 39 or 29.5% were in wholesale or retail sales or the repair of motor vehicles, 22 or 16.7% were in the movement and storage of goods, 10 or 7.6% were in a hotel or restaurant, 2 or 1.5% were in the information industry, 11 or 8.3% were the insurance or financial industry, 10 or 7.6% were technical professionals or scientists.

In 2000, there were 56 workers who commuted into the municipality and 373 workers who commuted away. The municipality is a net exporter of workers, with about 6.7 workers leaving the municipality for every one entering. Of the working population, 9.6% used public transportation to get to work, and 72.3% used a private car.

== Religion ==
From the 2000 census, 1,189 or 90.8% were Roman Catholic, while 41 or 3.1% belonged to the Swiss Reformed Church. Of the rest of the population, there were 4 individuals (or about 0.31% of the population) who belonged to another Christian church. There were 3 (or about 0.23% of the population) who were Islamic. There were 1 individual who belonged to another church. 42 (or about 3.21% of the population) belonged to no church, are agnostic or atheist, and 31 individuals (or about 2.37% of the population) did not answer the question.

== Education ==
In Vollèges about 461 or (35.2%) of the population have completed non-mandatory upper secondary education, and 92 or (7.0%) have completed additional higher education (either university or a Fachhochschule). Of the 92 who completed tertiary schooling, 71.7% were Swiss men, 25.0% were Swiss women.

As of 2000, there were 135 students from Vollèges who attended schools outside the municipality.

== Transport ==
The municipality has a railway station, Etiez, on the Martigny–Orsières line.
