= Val de Bagnes, Switzerland =

Val de Bagnes
- Municipality
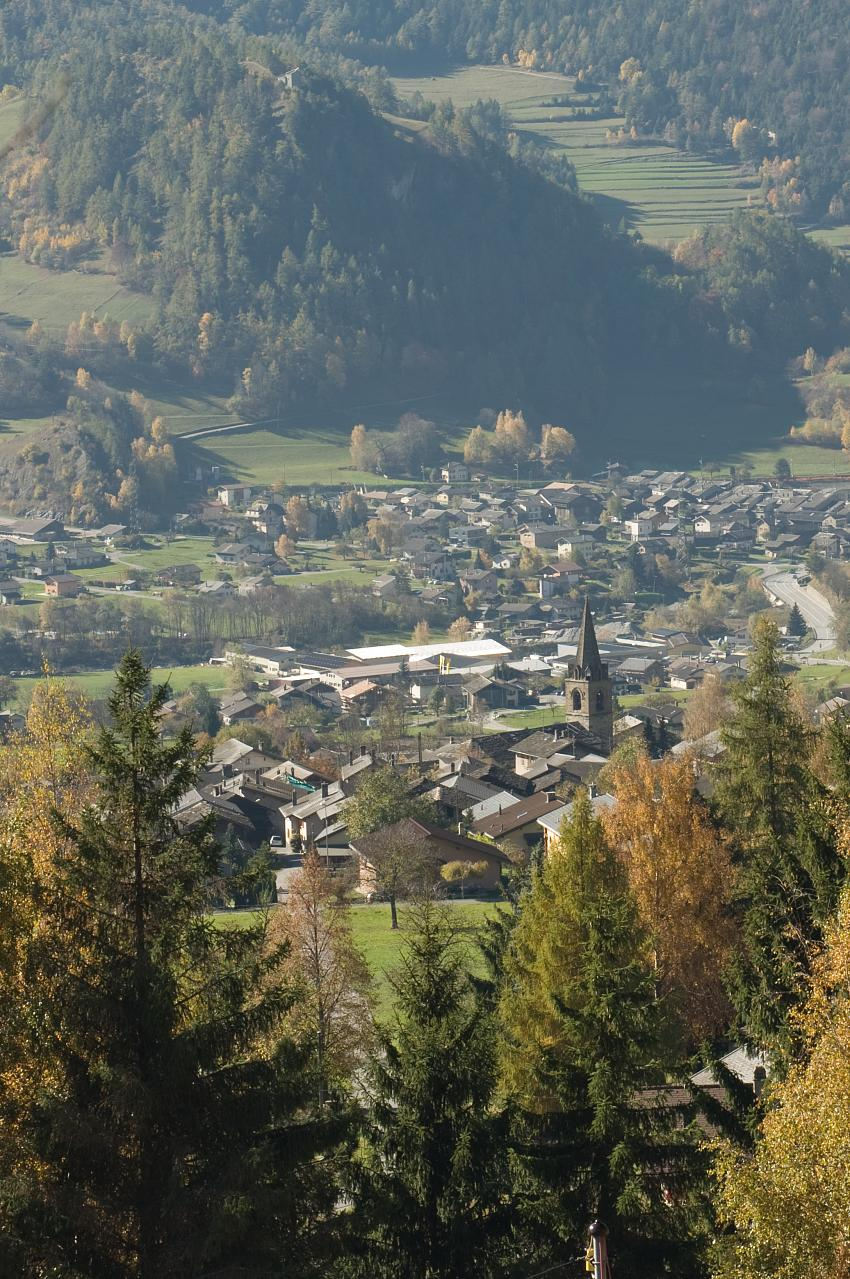
- Vollèges village

- Flag Coat of arms
- Location of Val de Bagnes
- Location within Switzerland Location within Canton of Valais
- Coordinates: 46°4′49″N 7°12′42″E
- Country: Switzerland
- Canton: Valais
- District: Entremont

Area
  - Total: 301.91 km^{2} (116.57 sq mi)
- Elevation: 820 m (2,690 ft)

Population (2020)
  - Total: 10,185
  - Density: 33.735/km^{2} (87.374/sq mi)
- Time zone: UTC+01:00 (CET)
  - Summer (DST): UTC+02:00 (CEST)
- Postal codes: 1934 Le Châble; 1941 Vollèges
- SFOS number: 6037
- ISO 3166 code: CH-TI
- Website: https://valdebagnes.ch

Val de Bagnes (French pronunciation: [val də baɲ]) is a municipality in the district of Entremont in the canton of Valais in Switzerland. It is named after the eponymous Val de Bagnes.

== History ==
On 1 January 2021, the existing political communes of Bagnes and Vollèges merged to form the new political commune of Val de Bagnes.

=== Bagnes ===
Aerial view (1964)

Bagnes was first mentioned in 1150 as Banie. It was formerly known by its German name, Bangis, although this is no longer used.

Before 1150, when it came to the abbey of Saint-Maurice, Bagnes was owned by the Counts of Savoy. It remained under the abbey's authority until 1798, when it became part of the Entremont district. Verbier castle (also called the abbaye) is first mentioned in 1287 in Le Châble and was presumably destroyed in 1476.

Throughout the 19th century, the radicals and conservatives feuded violently in the villages. This led, in 1844, to the bloody battle of Corberaye, in which three conservatives were killed. The battle of Corberaye brought the radicals to power, but the conservatives were able gain support from political allies and were able to return to power shortly thereafter. One consequence of this political discord was the founding of the liberal-radical free school in 1900. At the free school there was no religious instruction, in contrast to the other village schools which had been founded by religious groups. The free school remained open until 1943.

The parish is first mentioned in 1178, with the parish church at St. Martin's church in Le Châble. The parsonage was built in 1686 at Verbier. It became a rectory in 1915 and a parish in 1962. Other chapels are located in Montagnier (14th century), Sarreyer (after 1639), Lourtier (1659), Vernays (1661), Media (1679), Champsec (1684) and Versegères (1684).

The municipality suffered from frequent natural disasters, especially from the floods of the Dranse in 1469, 1595 and a particularly devastating flood in 1818. There were silver mines in the area between 1344 and 1723 and again between 1852 and 1855. In 1958 the Lac de Mauvoisin Dam was built. The dam along with increasing tourism in the mid-20th century changed the character of the villages dramatically. The village economies changed from alpine farming to domination by the services sector.

Until 1957 Bagnes was a loose federation of villages, which was divided into districts or sections. The local councils continued to represent their sections until 1971.

=== Le Châble ===
Le Châble was the capital of the former municipality of Bagnes.

Starting in the 12th century, Le Châble was the administrative center of the entire Val de Bagnes. Verbier castle (also called the abbaye) is first mentioned in 1287. The castle came to be known as the abbaye since it was the seat of the abbey of Saint-Maurice's representative. In 1410 the castle was rebuilt into a residence of the abbots. In 1476 it was partially destroyed by the villagers. In 1745 it was besieged during the revolt against the abbot of Saint-Maurice. The castle was acquired in the 20th century by the municipality.

The facade of the late gothic parish church of St. Mauritius was built in 1520 and the choir was finished in 1534. The ossuary dates back to 1560 and the parish house to the 16th century.

In 1953, the village was connected to the Martigny-Sembrancher-Le Châble rail line.

== Geography ==
After the merger, Val de Bagnes has an area, (as of the 2004/09 survey), of 301.89 km^{2} (116.56 sq mi).

== Demographics ==
The new municipality has a population (as of December 2020) of 10,185.

== Historic Population ==
The historical population is given in the following chart:

== Heritage sites of national significance ==
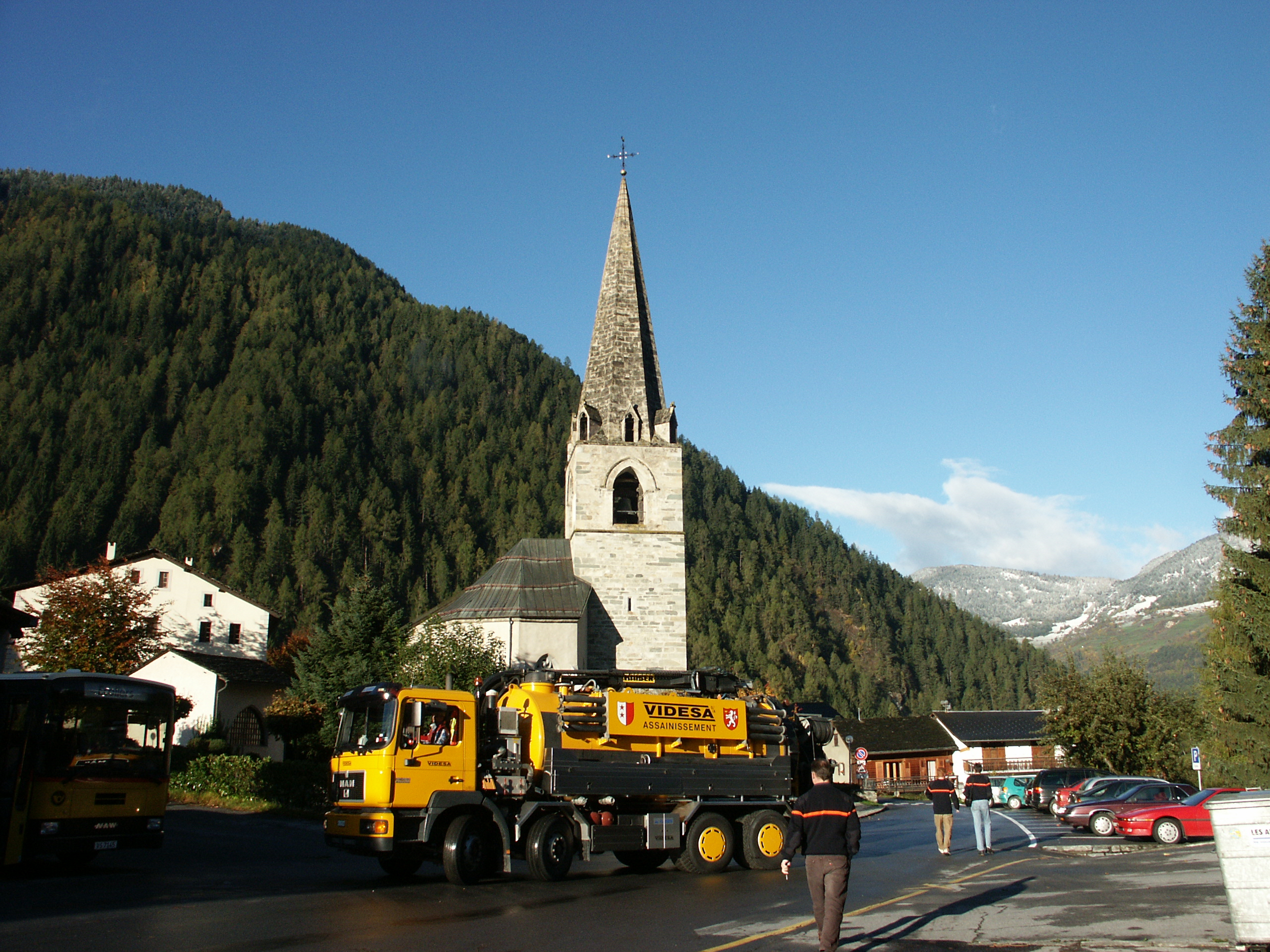
Church of St-Maurice

The Alpage (alpine pasture) de Louvie and the Church of St-Maurice with ossuary and the former rectory are listed as Swiss heritage site of national significance. The villages of Bruson, Le Châble, Médières, Sarreyer and Vollèges along with the hamlets of Fontenelle and Vens are all part of the Inventory of Swiss Heritage Sites.
