= Joseph Vaudan =

Swiss Catholic priest (1925–2008)

Joseph Vaudan (1925 - 2008) was a Catholic priest in the Order of St. Bernard responsible for the birth of commercial wine making in Valle d'Aosta, Italy, and one of the earliest directors of the Institut Agricole Regionale (IAR) in Aosta in Italy's Valle d'Aosta following World War II.

== Biography ==
Vaudan was born in Bagnes (Valais - Switzerland) on 15 April 1925. On November 8, 1948, he became a novice in the Grand St. Bernard Monastery.Canonici_regolari_della_Congregazione_ospedaliera_del_Gran_San_Bernardo An avid student of agriculture at the university level, he achieved his PhD in agronomy in 1959, from Catholic University of Plaisance. He died at Maison Saint-Bernard in Martigny, Switzerland, on March 28, 2008.

Vaudan and IAR Institut_Agricole_Régional are widely credited with the economic renaissance of this region of Italy after the devastation of World War II. The Institute's winery, created by Vaudan, is directly responsible for the birth of commercial wine making in Valle d'Aosta and creating the market for niche wines made of Valle d'Aosta's indigenous species: fumin, petit rouge, cornalin, prie blanc, mayolet, vuillermin. In the 1970s, under Vaudan's directorship, the IAR searched abandoned farms in the region to re-discover grape varietals that had been lost.

The winery currently in use came into operation with the 2005 vintage to replace the previous structure cave experimentale built in 1969 by Father Vaudan to educate, train and orient each new generation of winemakers and to encourage the production of quality wines, which could reflect the character of the Aosta Valley.

Father Vaudan became a novice on September 8, 1948. He took his solemn vows on Sept 18, 1952, and became a priest at the Hospice du Grand-Saint-Bernard (Congrégation du Grand-Saint-Bernard, see Wikipedia) on June 15, 1954. He started as director of the school of agriculture in Aoste on February 27, 1959.

As an active member of Accademia Italiana della Vite e del Vino, Father Vaudan helped further the cause of Valdostani winemakers.

Gifted with a strong spirit of initiative, he is responsible for the construction of the experimental cellar of vinification, the distribution and propagation of indigenous varieties of vine, the improvement of the property of the Montfleury farm, the introduction of modern farming tools and dairy methods to the Aosta Valley.
