= Entremont District =

Coordinates: 46°3′42″N 7°16′23″E

Entremont District d'Entremont
- District
- Flag Coat of arms
- Country: Switzerland
- Canton: Valais
- Capital: Sembrancher

Area
  - Total: 633.2 km^{2} (244.5 sq mi)

Population (2020)
  - Total: 15,519
  - Density: 24.51/km^{2} (63.48/sq mi)
- Time zone: UTC+1 (Central European Time)
  - Summer (DST): UTC+2 (Central European Summer Time)
- Municipalities: 5

The district of Entremont is a district in the canton of Valais in Switzerland. It has a population of 15,519 (as of 31 December 2020).

== Municipalities ==
It comprises the following municipalities:

Municipality	Population (31 December 2020)	Area km^{2}
Bourg-Saint-Pierre	211	90.09
Liddes	735	60.16
Orsières	3,194	165.02
Sembrancher	1,050	17.63
Val de Bagnes	10,185	300.13
Total	15,519	633.03

== Mergers ==
On 1 January 2021 the former municipalities of Bagnes and Vollèges merged to form the new municipality of Val de Bagnes.

== Coat of arms ==
The blazon of the municipal coat of arms is Azure, a Ram rampant Argent horned Or and langued and hoofed Gules, pierced by a sword Argent hilted Or, on four mounts Vert.

== Demographics ==
Entremont has a population (as of December 2020) of 15,519. Most of the population (as of 2000) speaks French (11,149 or 91.9%) as their first language, Portuguese is the second most common (275 or 2.3%) and German is the third (201 or 1.7%). There are 122 people who speak Italian and 2 people who speak Romansh.

As of 2008, the gender distribution of the population was 51.1% male and 48.9% female. The population was made up of 5,616 Swiss men (40.4% of the population) and 1,493 (10.7%) non-Swiss men. There were 5,590 Swiss women (40.2%) and 1,208 (8.7%) non-Swiss women. Of the population in the district 7,166 or about 59.0% were born in Entremont and lived there in 2000. There were 1,721 or 14.2% who were born in the same canton, while 1,168 or 9.6% were born somewhere else in Switzerland, and 1,796 or 14.8% were born outside of Switzerland.

As of 2000, there were 5,245 people who were single and never married in the district. There were 5,734 married individuals, 754 widows or widowers and 405 individuals who are divorced.

There were 1,422 households that consist of only one person and 503 households with five or more people. Out of a total of 4,742 households that answered this question, 30.0% were households made up of just one person and there were 62 adults who lived with their parents. Of the rest of the households, there are 1,050 married couples without children, 1,652 married couples with children There were 250 single parents with a child or children. There were 94 households that were made up of unrelated people and 212 households that were made up of some sort of institution or another collective housing.

The historical population is given in the following chart:

== Politics ==
In the 2007 federal election the most popular party was the CVP which received 51.76% of the vote. The next three most popular parties were the FDP (20.08%), the SVP (13.43%) and the SP (8.39%). In the federal election, a total of 5,031 votes were cast, and the voter turnout was 56.1%.

In the 2009 Conseil d'État/Staatsrat election a total of 4,659 votes were cast, of which 231 or about 5.0% were invalid. The voter participation was 53.2%, which is similar to the cantonal average of 54.67%. In the 2007 Swiss Council of States election a total of 4,931 votes were cast, of which 357 or about 7.2% were invalid. The voter participation was 56.4%, which is similar to the cantonal average of 59.88%.

== Religion ==
From the 2000 census, 10,194 or 84.0% were Roman Catholic, while 608 or 5.0% belonged to the Swiss Reformed Church. Of the rest of the population, there were 59 members of an Orthodox church (or about 0.49% of the population), there were 3 individuals (or about 0.02% of the population) who belonged to the Christian Catholic Church, and there were 57 individuals (or about 0.47% of the population) who belonged to another Christian church. There were 14 individuals (or about 0.12% of the population) who were Jewish, and 85 (or about 0.70% of the population) who were Islamic. There were 5 individuals who were Buddhist, 3 individuals who were Hindu and 9 individuals who belonged to another church. 630 (or about 5.19% of the population) belonged to no church, are agnostic or atheist, and 491 individuals (or about 4.05% of the population) did not answer the question.

== Education ==
In Entremont about 4,292 (35.4% of the population) have completed non-mandatory upper secondary education, and 1,107 (9.1%) have completed additional higher education (either University or a Fachhochschule). Of the 1,107 who completed tertiary schooling, 52.0% were Swiss men, 23.7% were Swiss women, 13.9% were non-Swiss men and 10.4% were non-Swiss women.
