= Sembrancher =

Municipality in Valais, Switzerland

- Municipality
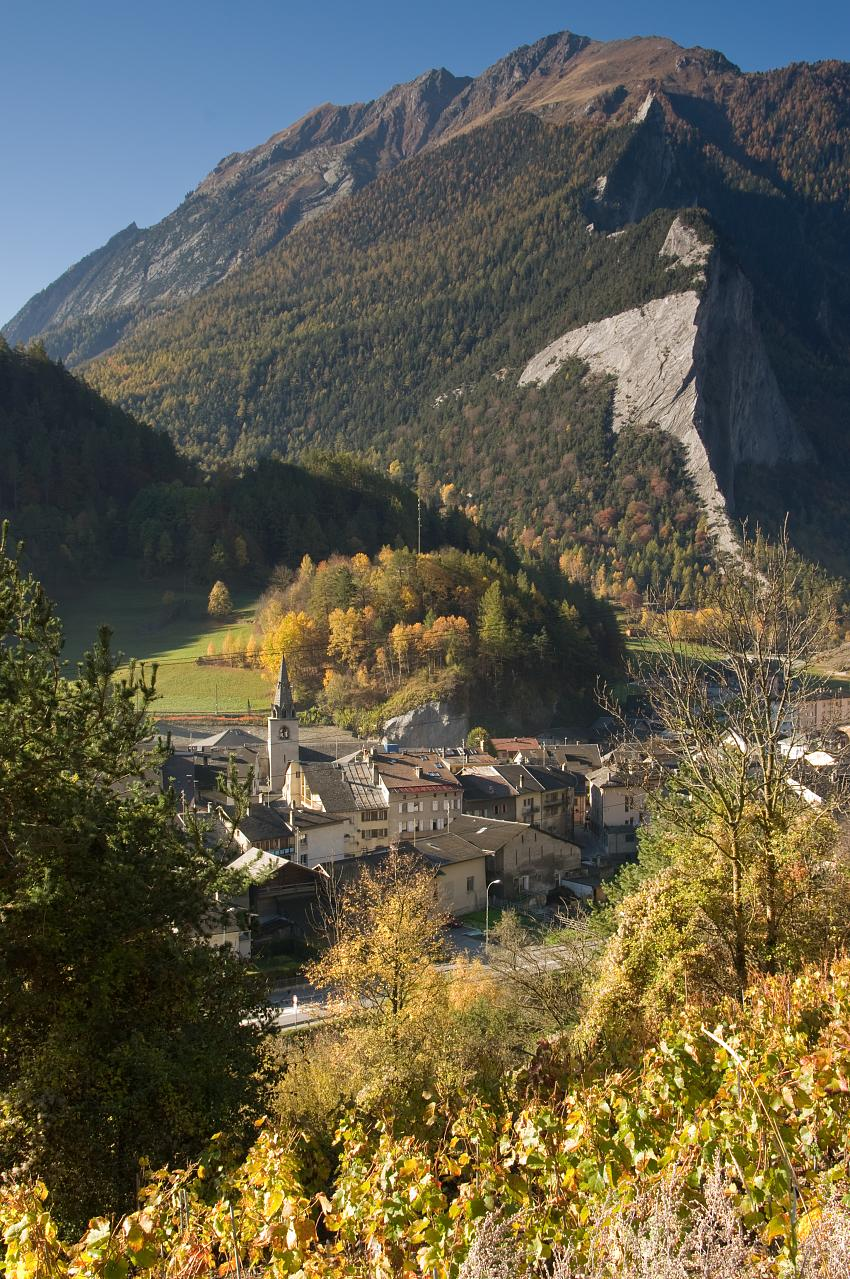

- Flag Coat of arms
- Location of Sembrancher
- Location within Switzerland Location within Canton of Valais
- Coordinates: 46°5′N 7°9′E
- Country: Switzerland
- Canton: Valais
- District: Entremont

Government
  - Mayor: Bernard Giovanola

Area
  - Total: 17.6 km^{2} (6.8 sq mi)
- Elevation: 717 m (2,352 ft)

Population (December 2002)
  - Total: 796
  - Density: 45.2/km^{2} (117/sq mi)
- Time zone: UTC+01:00 (CET)
  - Summer (DST): UTC+02:00 (CEST)
- Postal code: 1933
- SFOS number: 6035
- ISO 3166 code: CH-VS
- Surrounded by: Bagnes, Bovernier, Orsières, Vollèges
- Twin towns: Saint-Laurent-des-Arbres (France)
- Website: www.sembrancher.ch

Sembrancher (French pronunciation: [sɑ̃bʁɑ̃ʃe]) is a municipality in the district of Entremont in the canton of Valais in Switzerland.

== History ==
Sembrancher is first mentioned in 1177 as Sancti Pancratii de Branchi. Its German name St Branschier is no longer used.

== Geography ==
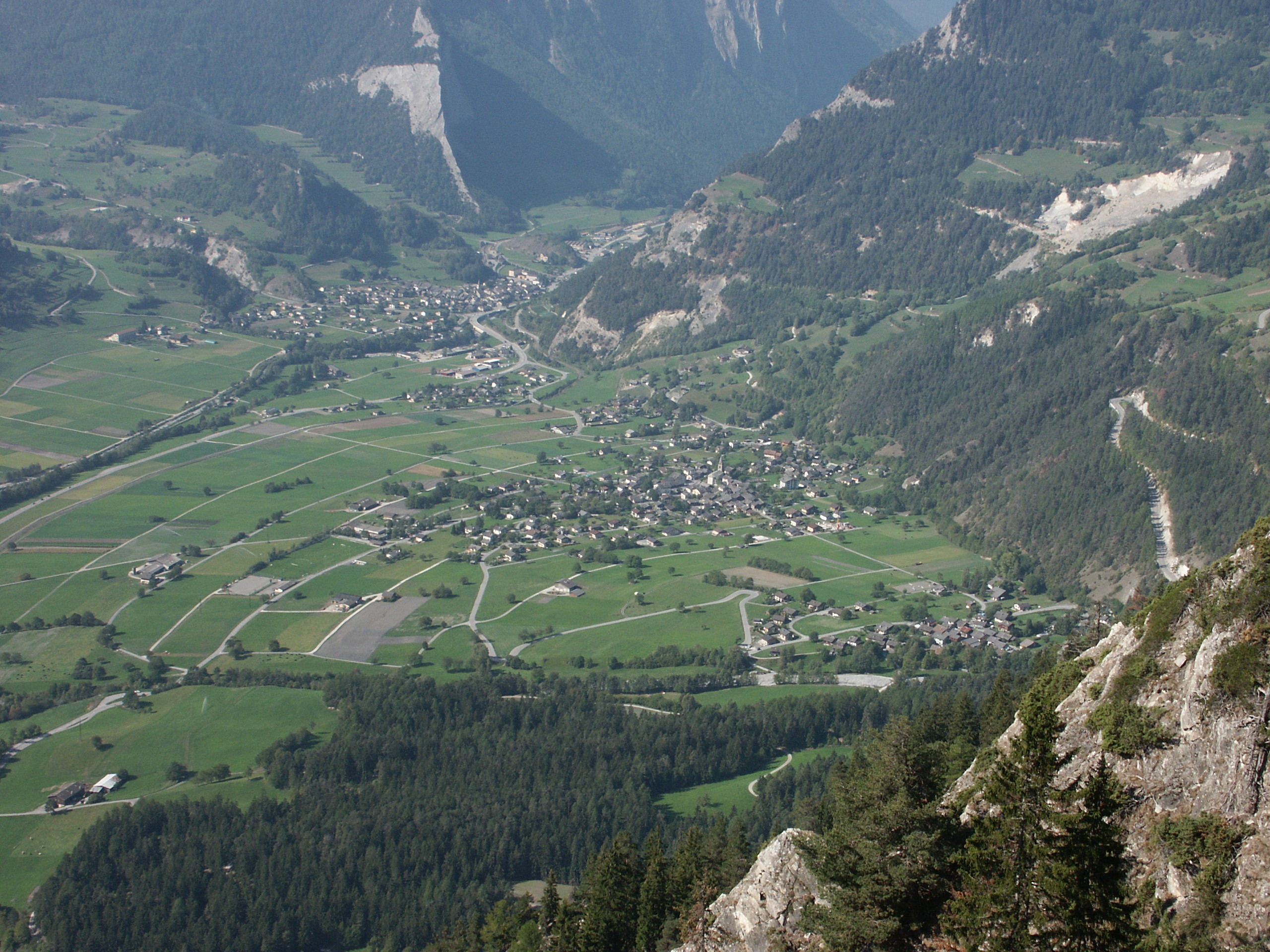
Sembrancher, Etiez & Vollèges villages

Sembrancher has an area, as of 2011, of 17.7 square kilometers (6.8 mi^{2}). Of this area, 17.5% is used for agricultural purposes, while 63.1% is forested. Of the rest of the land, 4.1% is settled (buildings or roads) and 15.3% is unproductive land.

The municipality is the capital of the district of Entremont. It is located at the confluence of the Dranse de Bagnes and the Dranse d'Entremont along the road over the Great St Bernard Pass. It lies about 10 km (6.2 mi) distant from Verbier ski resort and Martigny.

== Coat of arms ==
The blazon of the municipal coat of arms is Azure, in base Coupeaux Argent, issuant from sinister an Arm proper clad Vert and cuffed Argent holding a branch Or.

== Demographics ==
Sembrancher has a population (as of December 2020) of 1,050. As of 2008, 9.3% of the population are resident foreign nationals. Over the last 10 years (1999–2009) the population has changed at a rate of 3%. It has changed at a rate of 3% due to migration and at a rate of -0.4% due to births and deaths.

Most of the population (as of 2000) speaks French (778 or 98.2%) as their first language, German is the second most common (6 or 0.8%) and Italian is the third (4 or 0.5%).

As of 2008, the gender distribution of the population was 50.1% male and 49.9% female. The population was made up of 369 Swiss men (43.7% of the population) and 54 (6.4%) non-Swiss men. There were 381 Swiss women (45.1%) and 41 (4.9%) non-Swiss women. Of the population in the municipality 491 or about 62.0% were born in Sembrancher and lived there in 2000. There were 190 or 24.0% who were born in the same canton, while 73 or 9.2% were born somewhere else in Switzerland, and 36 or 4.5% were born outside of Switzerland.

The age distribution of the population (as of 2000) is children and teenagers (0–19 years old) make up 28.8% of the population, while adults (20–64 years old) make up 53.2% and seniors (over 64 years old) make up 18.1%.

As of 2000, there were 347 people who were single and never married in the municipality. There were 367 married individuals, 52 widows or widowers and 26 individuals who are divorced.

As of 2000, there were 299 private households in the municipality, and an average of 2.6 persons per household. There were 98 households that consist of only one person and 40 households with five or more people. Out of a total of 307 households that answered this question, 31.9% were households made up of just one person and there were 3 adults who lived with their parents. Of the rest of the households, there are 63 married couples without children, 120 married couples with children. There were 10 single parents with a child or children. There were 5 households that were made up of unrelated people and 8 households that were made up of some sort of institution or another collective housing.

In 2000 there were 171 single family homes (or 67.3% of the total) out of a total of 254 inhabited buildings. There were 62 multi-family buildings (24.4%), along with 11 multi-purpose buildings that were mostly used for housing (4.3%) and 10 other use buildings (commercial or industrial) that also had some housing (3.9%).

In 2000, a total of 279 apartments (74.4% of the total) were permanently occupied, while 75 apartments (20.0%) were seasonally occupied and 21 apartments (5.6%) were empty. As of 2009, the construction rate of new housing units was 2.4 new units per 1000 residents. The vacancy rate for the municipality, in 2010, was 0.75%.

Historical population

| Year | Pop. | ±% p.a. |
|---|---|---|
| 1802 | 567 | — |
| 1850 | 739 | +0.55% |
| 1860 | 737 | −0.03% |
| 1870 | 769 | +0.43% |
| 1880 | 780 | +0.14% |
| 1888 | 780 | +0.00% |

| Year | Pop. | ±% p.a. |
|---|---|---|
| 1900 | 716 | −0.71% |
| 1910 | 675 | −0.59% |
| 1920 | 641 | −0.52% |
| 1930 | 709 | +1.01% |
| 1941 | 681 | −0.37% |
| 1950 | 664 | −0.28% |

| Year | Pop. | ±% p.a. |
|---|---|---|
| 1960 | 710 | +0.67% |
| 1970 | 712 | +0.03% |
| 1980 | 671 | −0.59% |
| 1990 | 750 | +1.12% |
| 2000 | 792 | +0.55% |

== Sights ==
The entire small city of Sembrancher is designated as part of the Inventory of Swiss Heritage Sites.

== Politics ==
In the 2007 federal election the most popular party was the CVP which received 47.64% of the vote. The next three most popular parties were the FDP (21.05%), the SVP (17.15%) and the SP (9.05%). In the federal election, a total of 390 votes were cast, and the voter turnout was 62.7%.

In the 2009 Conseil d'État/Staatsrat election a total of 390 votes were cast, of which 14 or about 3.6% were invalid. The voter participation was 64.8%, which is much more than the cantonal average of 54.67%. In the 2007 Swiss Council of States election a total of 382 votes were cast, of which 29 or about 7.6% were invalid. The voter participation was 63.3%, which is similar to the cantonal average of 59.88%.

== Economy ==
Its spring water has a high fluorine content and is sold as 'Sembrancher'.

As of 2010, Sembrancher had an unemployment rate of 5.3%. As of 2008, there were 36 people employed in the primary economic sector and about 18 businesses involved in this sector. 138 people were employed in the secondary sector and there were 19 businesses in this sector. 129 people were employed in the tertiary sector, with 26 businesses in this sector. There were 342 residents of the municipality who were employed in some capacity, of which females made up 35.4% of the workforce.

In 2008 the total number of full-time equivalent jobs was 244. The number of jobs in the primary sector was 20, all of which were in agriculture. The number of jobs in the secondary sector was 128 of which 93 or (72.7%) were in manufacturing and 33 (25.8%) were in construction. The number of jobs in the tertiary sector was 96. In the tertiary sector; 35 or 36.5% were in wholesale or retail sales or the repair of motor vehicles, 3 or 3.1% were in the movement and storage of goods, 9 or 9.4% were in a hotel or restaurant, 3 or 3.1% were the insurance or financial industry, 8 or 8.3% were technical professionals or scientists, 6 or 6.3% were in education and 23 or 24.0% were in health care.

In 2000, there were 163 workers who commuted into the municipality and 220 workers who commuted away. The municipality is a net exporter of workers, with about 1.3 workers leaving the municipality for every one entering. Of the working population, 10.2% used public transportation to get to work, and 72.8% used a private car.

== Religion ==
From the 2000 census, 705 or 89.0% were Roman Catholic, while 29 or 3.7% belonged to the Swiss Reformed Church. Of the rest of the population, there was 1 individual who belongs to another Christian church. There were 3 (or about 0.38% of the population) who were Islamic. There were 1 individual who belonged to another church. 49 (or about 6.19% of the population) belonged to no church, are agnostic or atheist, and 4 individuals (or about 0.51% of the population) did not answer the question.

== Education ==
In Sembrancher about 258 or (32.6%) of the population have completed non-mandatory upper secondary education, and 48 or (6.1%) have completed additional higher education (either university or a Fachhochschule). Of the 48 who completed tertiary schooling, 83.3% were Swiss men, 14.6% were Swiss women.

As of 2000, there were 55 students from Sembrancher who attended schools outside the municipality.

== Transport ==
The municipality has a railway station, Sembrancher, on the Martigny–Orsières line.
