= Combin =

Combin may refer to:

- Néstor Combin
- COMBIN, various computer implementations of the mathematical sets-and-their-subsets-related "combinations" function

== See also ==
- Peaks in Pennine Alps of Switzerland:
  - Grand Combin
  - Petit Combin
  - Combin de Corbassière
  - Combin de Valsorey
  - Combin de Boveire
  - Combin de la Tsessette
