= Pointe de Boveire =

Mountain in Switzerland

- Location within Switzerland

Highest point
- Elevation: 3,212 m (10,538 ft)
- Prominence: 179 m (587 ft)
- Parent peak: Grand Combin
- Coordinates: 45°59′40″N 7°14′24″E

Geography
- Location: Valais, Switzerland
- Parent range: Pennine Alps

The Pointe de Boveire is a mountain of the Pennine Alps, located between Fionnay and Liddes in the canton of Valais. It lies north of the Petit Combin, in the Grand Combin massif.
