= Grand Tavé =

Mountain in Switzerland

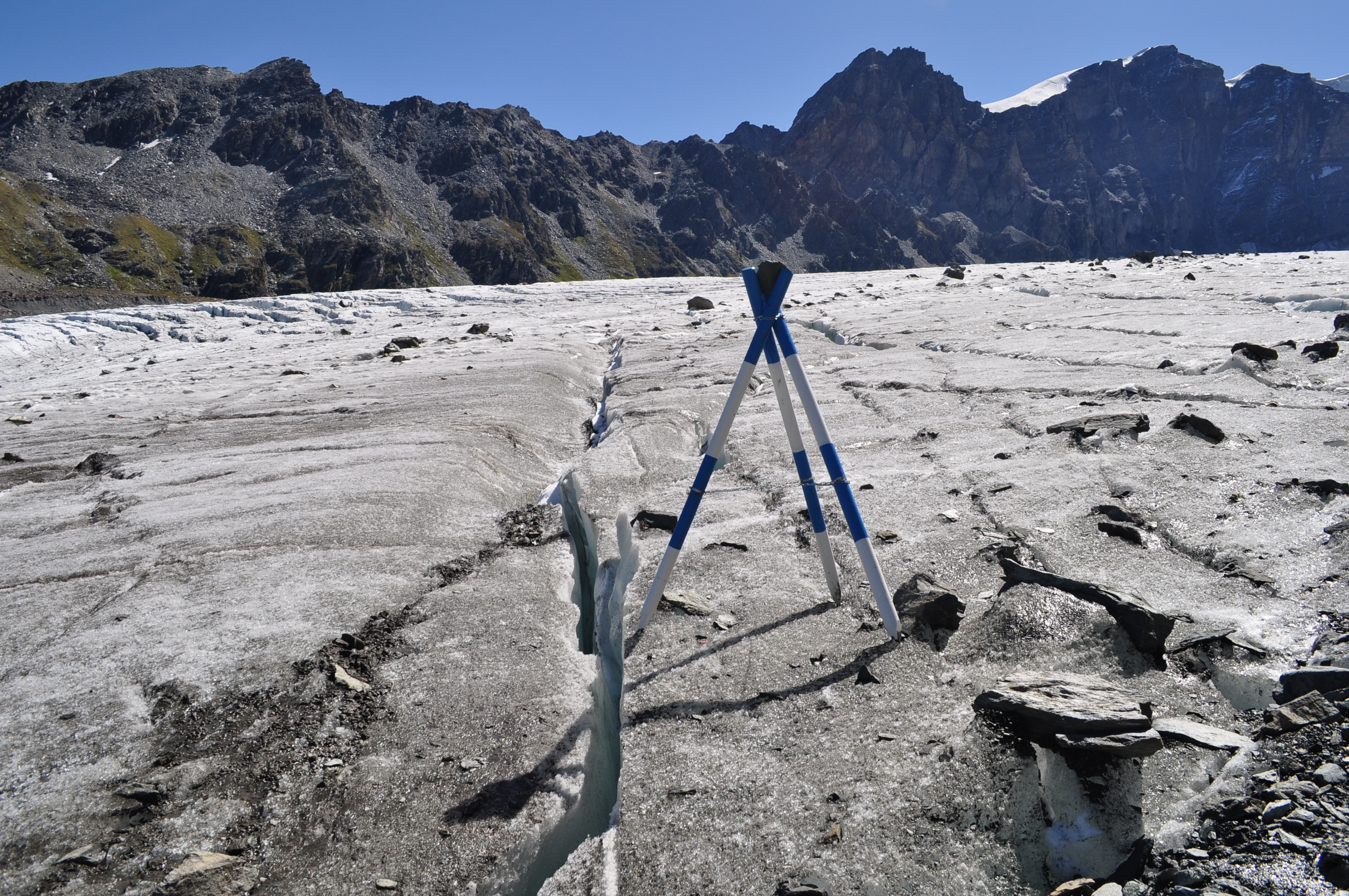
- Grand Tavé (left summit) from the Corbassière Glacier

Highest point
- Elevation: 3,158 m (10,361 ft)
- Prominence: 40 m (130 ft)
- Parent peak: Tavé des Chasseurs
- Coordinates: 45°59′36″N 7°18′52″E

Geography
- Location within Switzerland
- Location: Valais, Switzerland
- Parent range: Pennine Alps

The Grand Tavé (3,158 m) is a mountain of the Swiss Pennine Alps, located south of Fionnay in the canton of Valais. It belongs to the Grand Combin massif and lies east of the Corbassière Glacier.

It lies just south of the Col des Otannes (2,846 m), from where the summit is usually reached.
