= Le Ritord =

Mountain in Switzerland

- Location within Switzerland

Highest point
- Elevation: 3,556 m (11,667 ft)
- Prominence: 61 m (200 ft)
- Parent peak: Grande Aiguille
- Coordinates: 45°57′46.5″N 7°15′22.7″E

Geography
- Location: Valais, Switzerland
- Parent range: Pennine Alps

Le Ritord is a mountain of the Pennine Alps, situated near Bourg Saint Pierre in the canton of Valais. It is part of the Grand Combin massif.

The mountains overlooks the Boveire Glacier on its north side.
