= Gele =

Gele may refer to:

== Geography ==
- River Gele, a river in Wales
- Mont Gelé (Bagnes), a mountain on the border between Bagnes, Valais, in Switzerland and Valle d'Aosta in Italy
- Mont Gelé (Riddes), a mountain in Valais, Switzerland
- Gele Mountain, Geleshan National Forest Park, near Chongqing, China

== People ==
- Sophie Harmansdochter (1505–1562), also known as Gele Fye, Dutch informant targeting religious minorities
- Gela Seksztajn (1907–1943), also known as Gele Seckstein, Polish-Jewish artist and painter

== Other uses ==
- Gele (electoral ward), Conwy County Borough, Wales
- Fongoro language or Gele, a nearly extinct language spoken in Chad
- Kele language (New Guinea) or Gele’
- Gele (head tie), worn by Yoruba women
- Prosopis africana, a tree species called gele in the Malinka language

== See also ==
- Alphonse van Gèle (1848–1939), Belgian soldier and Vice-Governor General of the Congo Free State
