= Col de Crête Sèche =

Mountain pass in the Alps

- Location within Alps
- Elevation: 2,896 metres (9,501 ft)
- Traversed by: Trail

Third Approach
- Location: Valais, Switzerland; Aosta Valley, Italy
- Range: Pennine Alps
- Coordinates: 45°53′58″N 7°23′28″E

The Col de Crête Sèche (French: "dry ridge pass") is a mountain pass in the Alps, located between Switzerland and Italy. It lies at a height of 2,896 metres (9,501 ft) above sea level, between the massifs of Mont Gelé and Bec d'Epicoune, in the Pennine Alps. It connects Fionnay in the Swiss canton of Valais on its northern side to Bionaz in the Italian region of the Aosta Valley on its southern side. The Col de Crête Sèche is the second-lowest pass between the valleys of Bagnes and Valpelline, after the Fenêtre de Durand which lies about one hundred metres lower west of Mont Gelé.

The pass is traversed by a trail, the Swiss side involving a much longer approach than the Italian side. On the latter side, at an elevation of 2,385 metres (7,825 ft), is the Refuge Crête Sèche (Italian Alpine Club). On the Swiss side the closest mountain hut is the Cabane de Chanrion (Swiss Alpine Club), at an elevation of 2,462 metres (8,077 ft).
