= Les Masses =

Coordinates: 46.1833°N 7.4°E

Les Masses is a small ski resort town in Val d'Herens. Les Masses is part of the municipality of Hérémence, Valais, Switzerland. It is in the Four Valleys ski area, in the easternmost part, at 1500 metres altitude.

Les Masses was formerly an area with a few barns and shooting sheds. It is still a very quiet place. The houses are nearly all wooden chalets, with only a few apartment buildings no higher than three or four floors. Located in the centre of Les Masses is Restaurant Le Bois Sauvage, a modernised restaurant serving modern Swiss and International cuisine, and a little grocery shop. 300 metres from the centre is a new high speed 4 person chairlift Les Masses Express with underground parking for 206 cars, a ticket office, rental agency and bar Le Sapin Bleu which serves light food and drinks during the winter season. There are 2 tennis courts close to the parking garage.

Les Masses is part of the "Four Valleys" ski area, which includes the ski resorts of Verbier, Nendaz, Veysonnaz, La Tzoumaz, and Thyon with a total of 410 km marked runs. The ski area is divided into four sectors: Verbier, Nendaz, Veysonnaz, Thyon. Les Masses forms the most eastern village of the 4 Valleys ski area, close to Thyon. A common ski pass allows to tour all the way from Verbier to La Tzoumaz, Nendaz, Veysonnaz, to Les Masses and back. A Printze ski pass allows to tour to Siviez and Nendaz.
