= Tavé des Chasseurs =

Mountain in Switzerland

- Location within Switzerland

Highest point
- Elevation: 3,165 m (10,384 ft)
- Prominence: 63 m (207 ft)
- Parent peak: Grand Combin
- Coordinates: 45°59′21.5″N 7°19′0.5″E

Geography
- Location: Valais, Switzerland
- Parent range: Pennine Alps

The Tavé des Chasseurs (3,165 m) is a mountain of the Swiss Pennine Alps, located south of Fionnay in the canton of Valais. It belongs to the Grand Combin massif and lies east of the Corbassière Glacier.
