= Mont Avril =

Mountain of the Pennine Alps

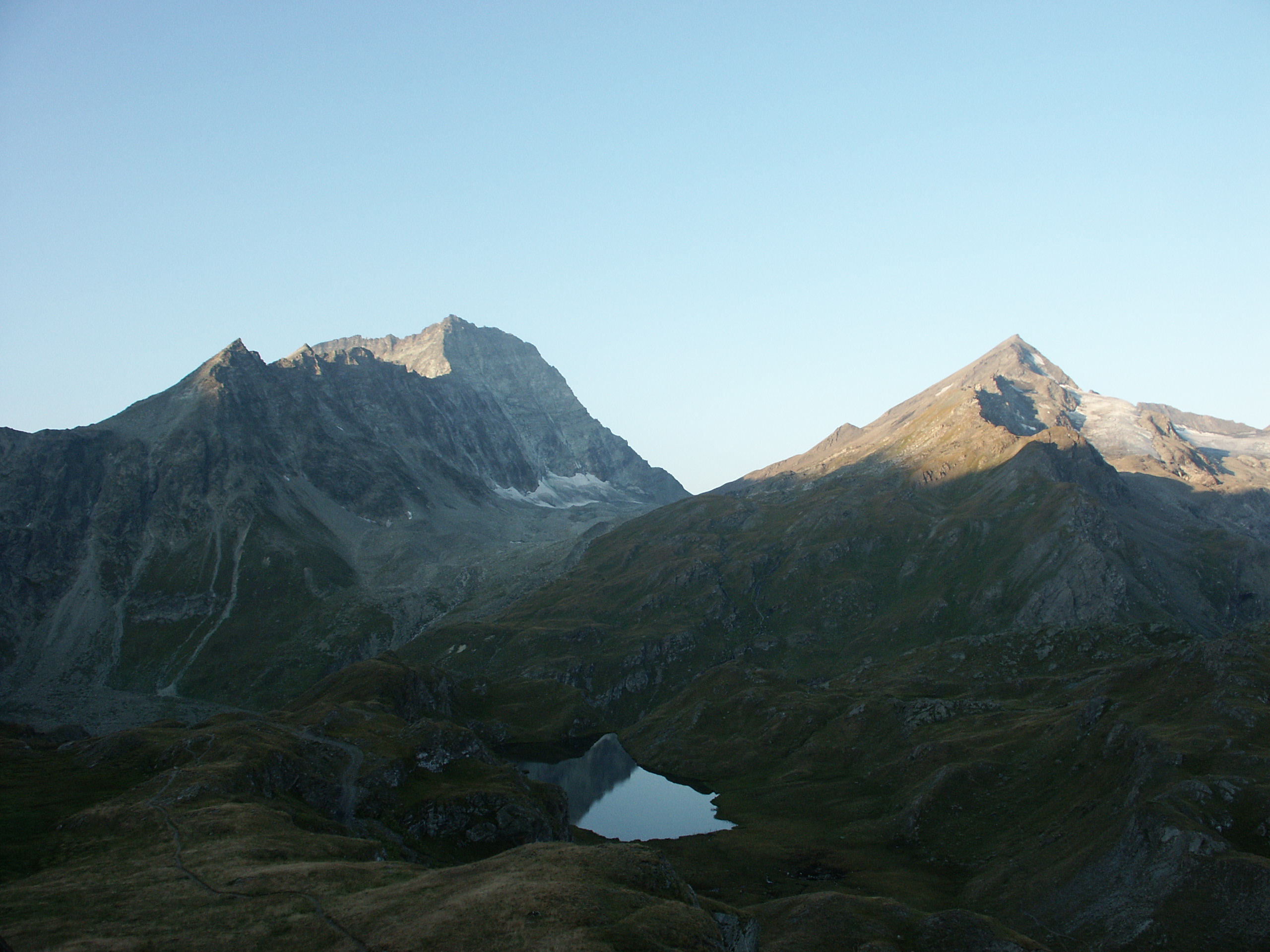
- Mont Gelé (left) and Mont Avril (right) from the north side

Highest point
- Elevation: 3,347 m (10,981 ft)
- Prominence: 158 m (518 ft)
- Parent peak: Grand Combin
- Isolation: 1.84 km (1.14 mi)
- Coordinates: 45°54′55″N 7°20′40″E

Geography
- Location within Alps
- Location: Valais, Switzerland/Aosta Valley, Italy
- Parent range: Pennine Alps

Mont Avril is a mountain of the Pennine Alps, located on the Swiss-Italian border. Its summit has an elevation of 3,347 metres above sea level and can be reached by a trail from the Fenêtre de Durand (2,800 m). Mont Avril is considered the smaller brother of Mont Gelé.
