= Combin de Boveire =

Mountain in Switzerland

- Location within Switzerland

Highest point
- Elevation: 3,663 m (12,018 ft)
- Prominence: 173 m (568 ft)
- Parent peak: Grande Aiguille
- Coordinates: 45°57′53.3″N 7°16′14.5″E

Geography
- Location: Valais, Switzerland
- Parent range: Pennine Alps

The Combin de Boveire is a mountain of the Pennine Alps, located in the Grand Combin massif in Valais. It lies between the Boveire Glacier and the Corbassière Glacier.
