= Bec des Rosses =

Mountain in Switzerland

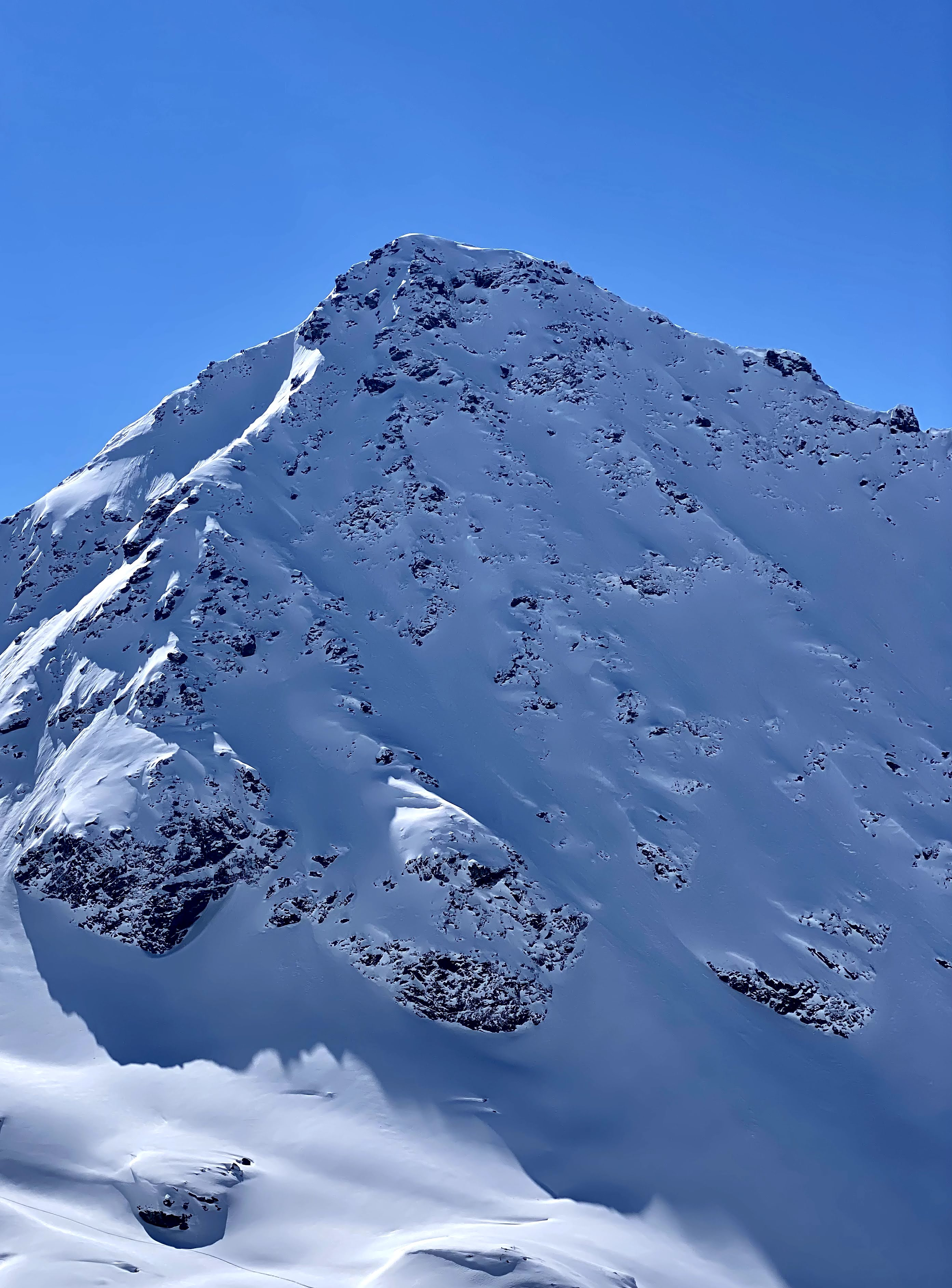
- The Bec des Rosses in perfect condition

Highest point
- Elevation: 3,223 m (10,574 ft)
- Prominence: 283 m (928 ft)
- Parent peak: Mont Fort
- Isolation: 2.52 km (1.57 mi)
- Coordinates: 46°4′19″N 7°17′56″E

Geography
- Location within Switzerland
- Location: Valais, Switzerland
- Parent range: Pennine Alps

The Bec des Rosses is a mountain of the Pennine Alps, overlooking Verbier in the Swiss canton of Valais. It is connected to Verbier and the 4 Vallees ski area.

Each year the Bec des Rosses hosts the world's most prestigious extreme skiing and snowboarding contest, the Verbier Extreme, the final event of the Freeride World Tour. Most routes down the face are between 55 and 60 degrees, and for this reason the Bec des Rosses is renowned as one of the toughest mountains to ski in the Alps.
