= La Cordée des Alpes =

- Interactive map of the La Cordée des Alpes area

General information
- Location: Verbier, Valais; Switzerland
- Coordinates: 46°05′54″N 7°13′18″E
- Opening: 2012
- Owner: Stratalp SA
- Management: KV HOTELS

Other information
- Number of rooms: 32
- Number of restaurants: 1
- Parking: Valet Parking

Website
- hotelcordee.com

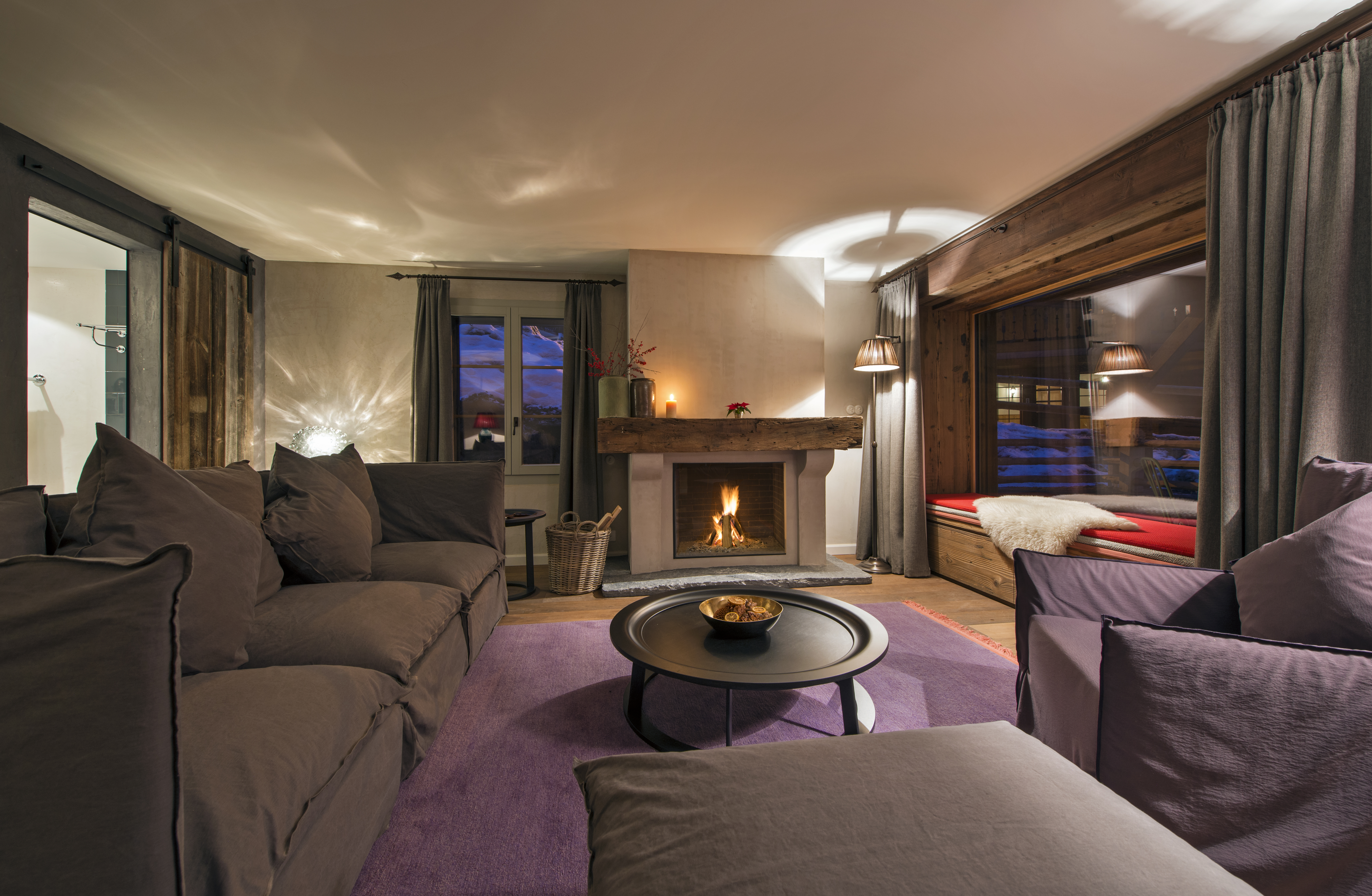
Prestige Suite of Hotel La Cordée des Alpes, Verbier

La Cordée des Alpes is four star hotel situated in the village Verbier, in the canton Valais, Switzerland. It was built in 2012 and it is part of KV HOTELS.

The hotel is a member of a group small luxury hotels (SLH).

The hotel features a spa Cinq Mondes and a bistronomic restaurant.
