= Hotel Nevai =

Hotel in Canton Valais, Switzerland

Hotel Nevai is a four-star hotel in the Verbier ski resort in Canton Valais, Switzerland. It was established in December 2007, replacing the Hotel Rhodania, and is a member of Design Hotels.

== Facilities ==
Hotel Nevai's facilities include a spa called Elemis, a sushi restaurant and a nightclub called the Farm Club. The hotel has 33 rooms and two penthouse apartments. The hotel's nightclub, called the Farm Club, was opened in 1971 by two Italian brothers, the Berardis. It is one of the oldest clubs in the Alps and maintains a 1970s' theme.

== Style ==
The hotel was renovated in 2007 by Yasmine Mahmoudieh from Architonic. The retrofit aimed to reflect the surrounding mountains while avoiding the tropes of typical alpine styles.
