= Grande Aiguille =

Mountain in Switzerland

- Location within Switzerland

Highest point
- Elevation: 3,682 m (12,080 ft)
- Prominence: 223 m (732 ft)
- Parent peak: Combin de Corbassière
- Coordinates: 45°57′0.9″N 7°15′53.3″E

Geography
- Location: Valais, Switzerland
- Parent range: Pennine Alps

The Grande Aiguille is a mountain of the Swiss Pennine Alps, situated near Bourg Saint Pierre in the canton of Valais. With an elevation of 3,682 metres above sea level, it the culminating point of the ridge named Les Maisons Blanches that lies west of the Corbassière Glacier, in the Grand Combin massif.
