= Lac de Louvie =

Lake in Valais, Switzerland

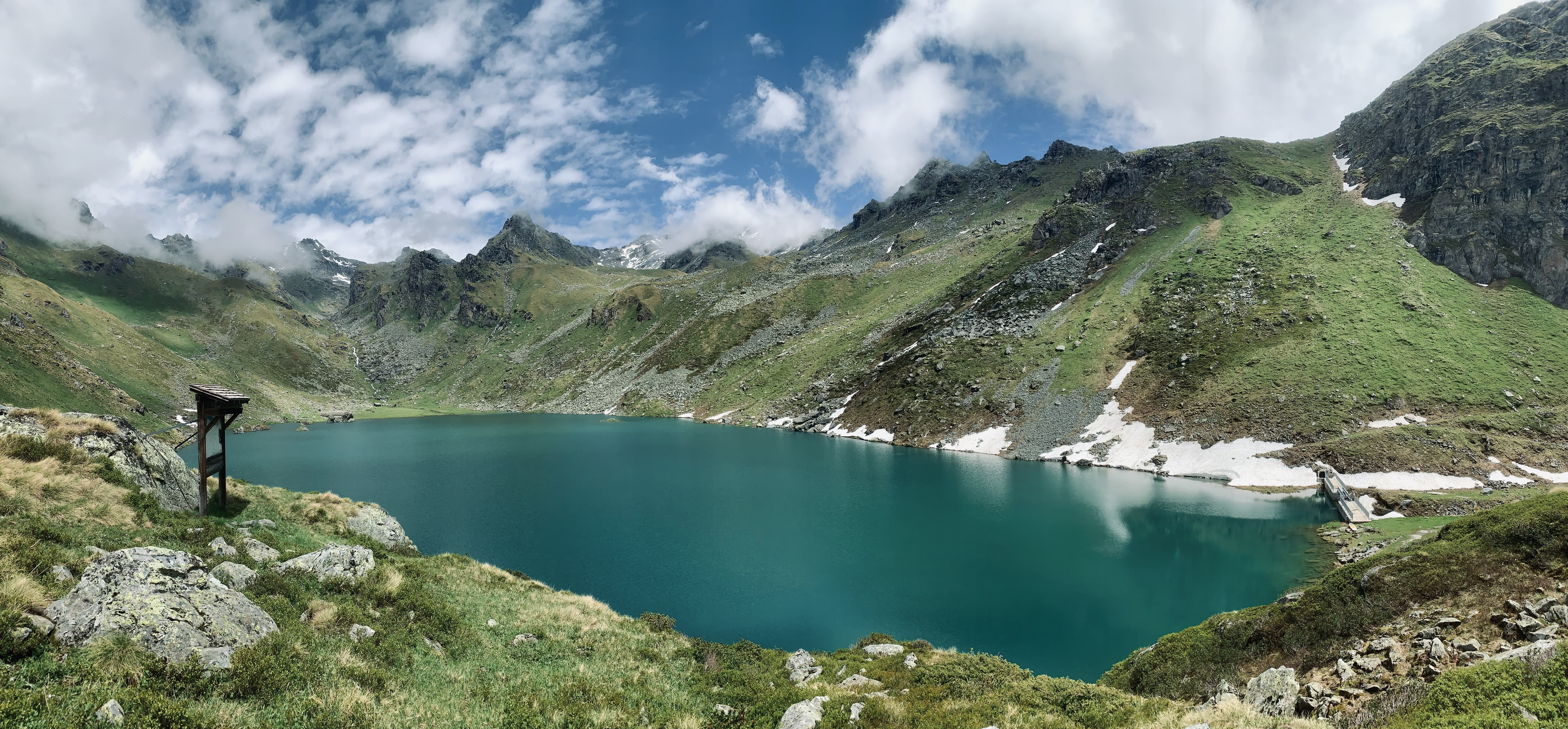

- Location within Canton of Valais Location within Switzerland Location within Alps
- Interactive map of Lac de Louvie
- Location: Fionnay, Valais
- Coordinates: 46°03′00″N 7°18′30″E
- Basin countries: Switzerland
- Surface area: 12 ha (30 acres)
- Surface elevation: 2,214 m (7,264 ft)

Lac de Louvie is an artificial lake above Fionnay in the canton of Valais, Switzerland.

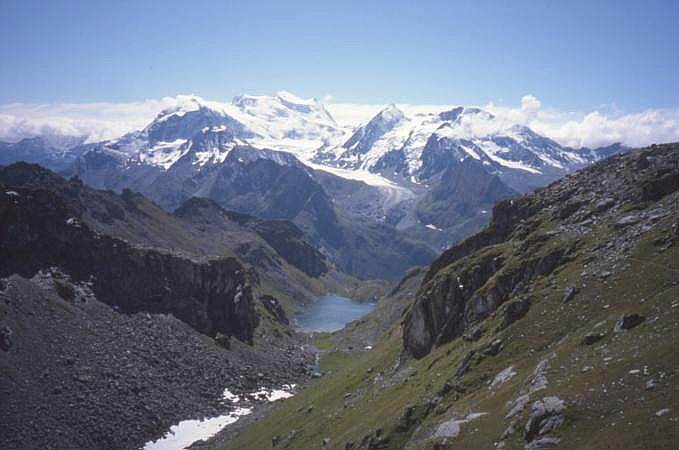
Lake with the Grand Combin in the background

The Lac de Louvie is often visited by hikers and trail runners. It is situated at 2,213 metres (7,260 ft) above sea level and is a 2-hour walk from Fionnay.

== See also ==
- List of mountain lakes of Switzerland
