= Aiguille du Croissant =

Mountain in Switzerland

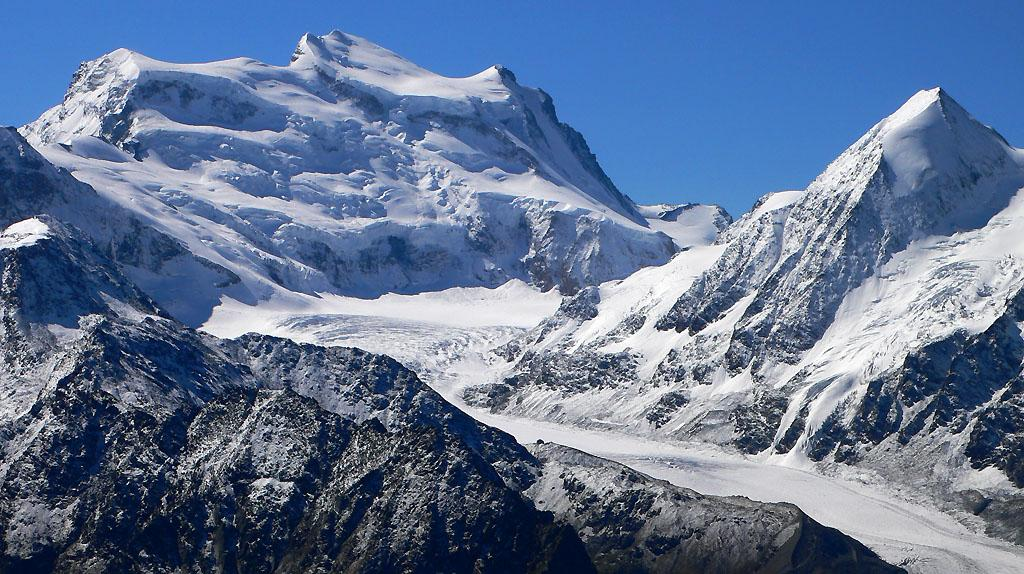
- Grand Combin, Pennine Alps

Highest point
- Elevation: 4,260 m (13,980 ft)
- Parent peak: Grand Combin
- Coordinates: 45°56′27.4″N 7°18′4.6″E

Geography
- Location within Switzerland
- Location: Valais, Switzerland
- Parent range: Pennine Alps

The Aiguille du Croissant is a minor summit in the Grand Combin massif in the Pennine Alps, Switzerland. Because of its small prominence it was included in the enlarged list of alpine four-thousanders.

The name refers to the crescent shaped summit.

== See also ==
- Swisstopo maps
