= Fenêtre de Durand =

Alpine pass connecting Switzerland and Italy

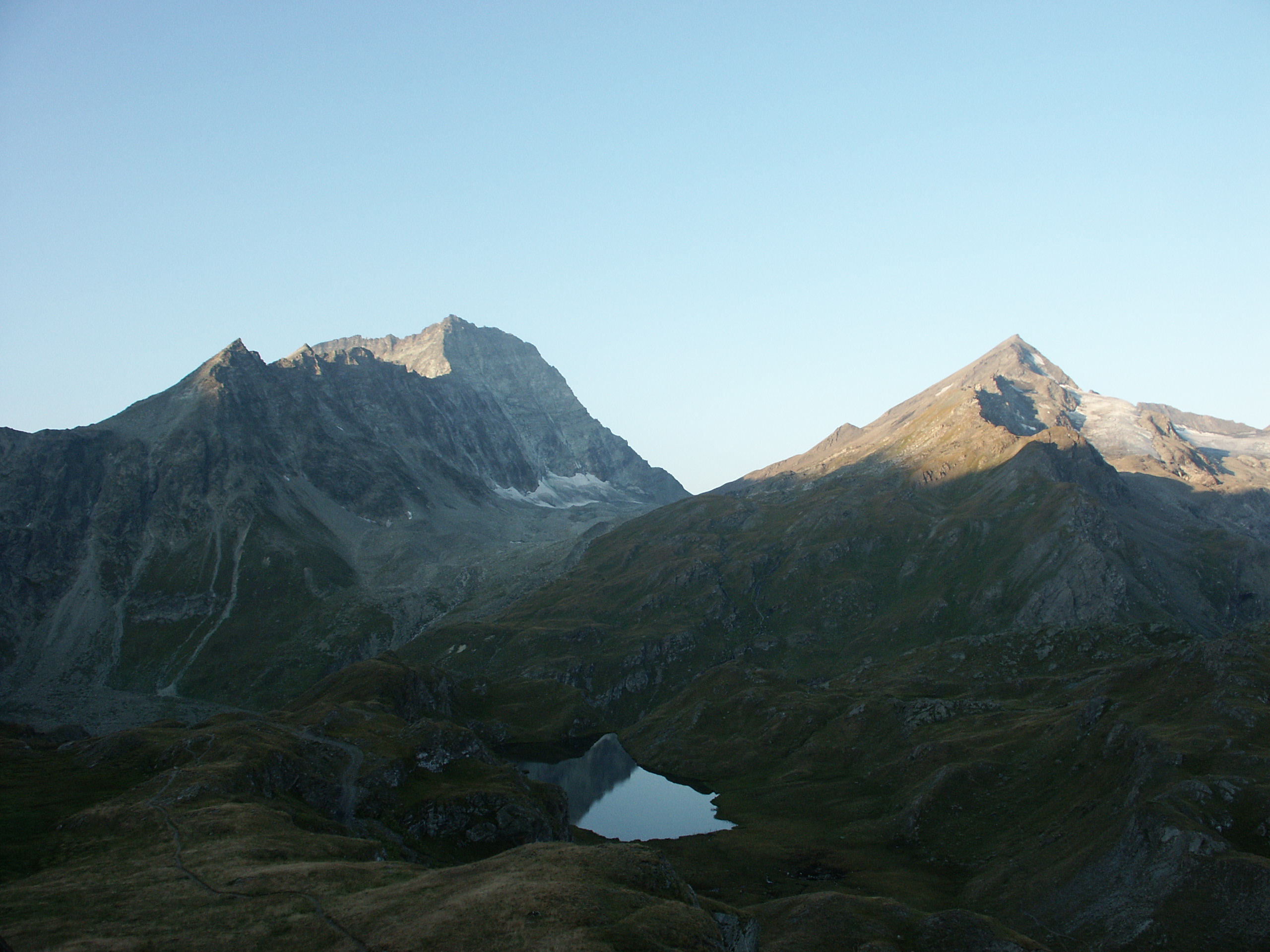
- The pass between Mont Gelé and Mont Avril

- Location within Alps
- Elevation: 2,797 metres (9,177 ft)
- Traversed by: Trail

Third Approach
- Location: Valais, Switzerland; Aosta Valley, Italy
- Range: Pennine Alps
- Coordinates: 45°54′35″N 7°21′22″E

The Fenêtre de Durand is an Alpine pass connecting Switzerland and Italy. It connects Fionnay (in Valais) on its northern side to Valpelline (in the Aosta Valley) on its southern side. At an elevation of 2,797 metres (9,177 ft) above sea level, the Fenêtre de Durand is the lowest pass on the main chain of the Alps between the Grand Combin and the Weissmies. The pass is traversed by a trail.

The pass is located between Mont Avril (west) and Mont Gelé (east).
