= Mont Gelé (Riddes) =

Mountain in Switzerland

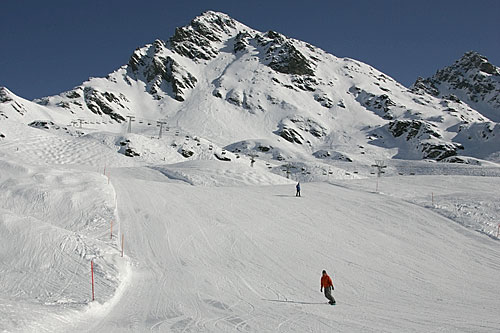
- Mont Gelé from the south side

Highest point
- Elevation: 3,022 m (9,915 ft)
- Prominence: 219 m (719 ft)
- Coordinates: 46°5′48.6″N 7°16′45.4″E

Geography
- Location within Switzerland
- Location: Valais, Switzerland
- Parent range: Pennine Alps

Climbing
- Easiest route: Aerial tramway

Mont Gelé (3,022 metres (9,915 ft)) is a mountain of the Pennine Alps, part of the Municipality Riddes and overlooking Verbier in the Swiss canton of Valais. Located on the range north of Mont Fort, its summit is the tripoint between the municipalities (and valleys) of Bagnes, Riddes and Nendaz. It is one of the two mountains named Mont Gelé in the valley of Bagnes, the other being located on the Italian border.

In winter, Mont-Gelé summit can be reached from Verbier (or Siviez / Nendaz) through aerial cable-car (upper station: 3,002 metres (9,849 ft)). It is also possible to go down the mountain by two official but off-piste ski slopes, for good skiers only.

== See also ==
- List of mountains of Switzerland accessible by public transport
