= Refuge Crête Sèche =

Shelter in the Alps of Italy

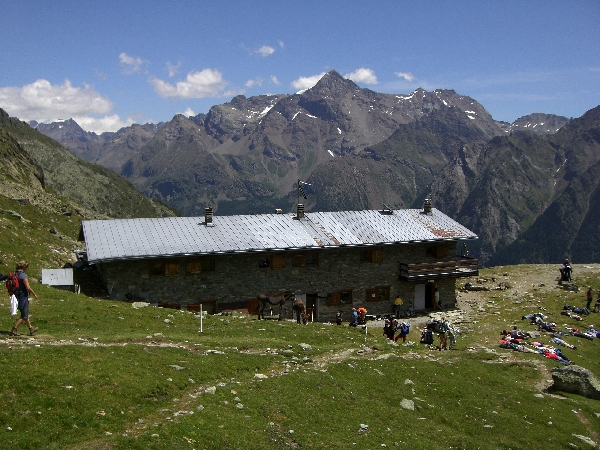
- Interactive map of the Refuge Crête Sèche area

General information
- Coordinates: 45°52′58″N 7°23′55″E
- Elevation: 2,410 m (7,910 ft)
- Year built: 1982
- Owner: Club Alpino Italiano

Website
- www.rifugiocreteseche.eu

Refuge Crête Sèche or Rifugio Crête Sèche is a shelter in the Alps of Italy near the border with Switzerland. More precisely, this refuge is located in the valley of Valpelline, a side valley of the Aosta Valley in the Italian Pennine Alps, at 2,410 metres (7,910 ft) above sea level. It lies on the slopes of Mont de Crête Sèche whose summit is at elevation 2,941 metres (9,649 ft).

The shelter was built in 1982, and is owned by the Italian Alpine Club. One of the nearby mountains to climb is Mont Gelé whose summit is 3,518 metres (11,542 ft) above sea level, and which can be accessed via the Col de Crête Sèche. This same mountain pass continues from Italy into the Swiss district of Entremont in the canton of Valais. Another mountain near this shelter is Bec d'Epicoune, elevation 3,531 metres (11,585 ft).

To reach the shelter, one can hike on a dirt trail for about two hours from the village of Rû in the municipality of Bionaz. The capacity of this shelter in summer is 86 beds, and in winter 8 beds.
