= Grande Tête de By =

Mountain in Switzerland

- Location within Alps

Highest point
- Elevation: 3,587 m (11,768 ft)
- Prominence: 67 m (220 ft)
- Parent peak: Grand Combin
- Coordinates: 45°55′11.4″N 07°17′53.3″E

Geography
- Location: Valais, Switzerland; Aosta Valley, Italy
- Parent range: Pennine Alps

The Grande Tête de By is a mountain of the Pennine Alps, located on the border between Italy and Switzerland. With a height of 3,587 metres above sea level, it is the highest summit on the Italian side of the Grand Combin massif.
