= Mont Durand Glacier =

Glacier in Switzerland

Coordinates: 45°55′13″N 7°19′49″E

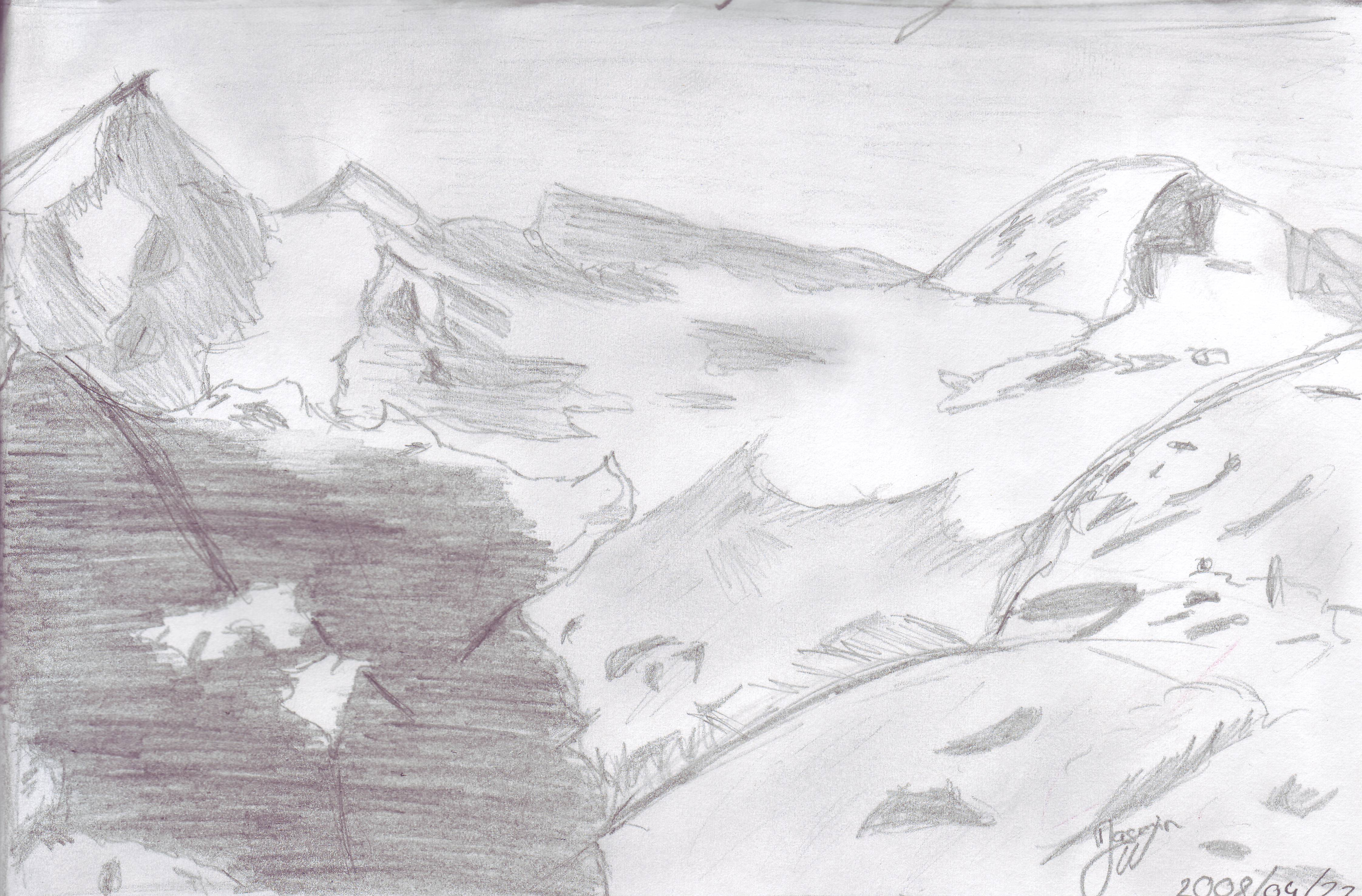
Mont Durand Glacier, drawing by Jasmin Nelly Weidmann

The Mont Durand Glacier (French: Glacier du Mont Durand) is a 5.9 km long glacier (2005) situated in the Grand Combin massif, Pennine Alps, in the canton of Valais in Switzerland. In 1973 it had an area of 7.5 km².

== See also ==
- List of glaciers in Switzerland
- Swiss Alps
