= Combin de Corbassière =

Mountain in Switzerland

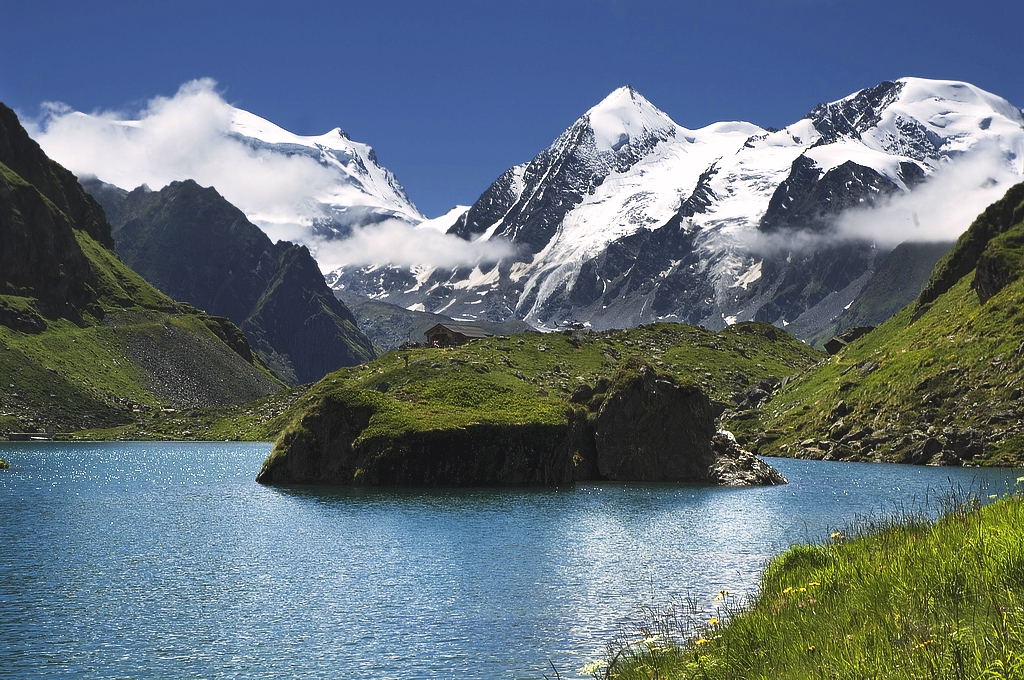
- Combin de Corbassière (center) seen from Lac de Louvie

Highest point
- Elevation: 3,716 m (12,192 ft)
- Prominence: 312 m (1,024 ft)
- Parent peak: Grand Combin
- Listing: Alpine mountains above 3000 m
- Coordinates: 45°58′41″N 7°16′50″E

Geography
- Location within Switzerland
- Location: Valais, Switzerland
- Parent range: Pennine Alps

The Combin de Corbassière is a mountain in the Pennine Alps, located south of Fionnay in the canton of Valais. It is part of the Grand Combin massif and lies on the west side of the Corbassière Glacier. It is also a main source for sparkling water.

== See also ==
- List of mountains of Switzerland
