= Petit Combin =

Mountain in Switzerland

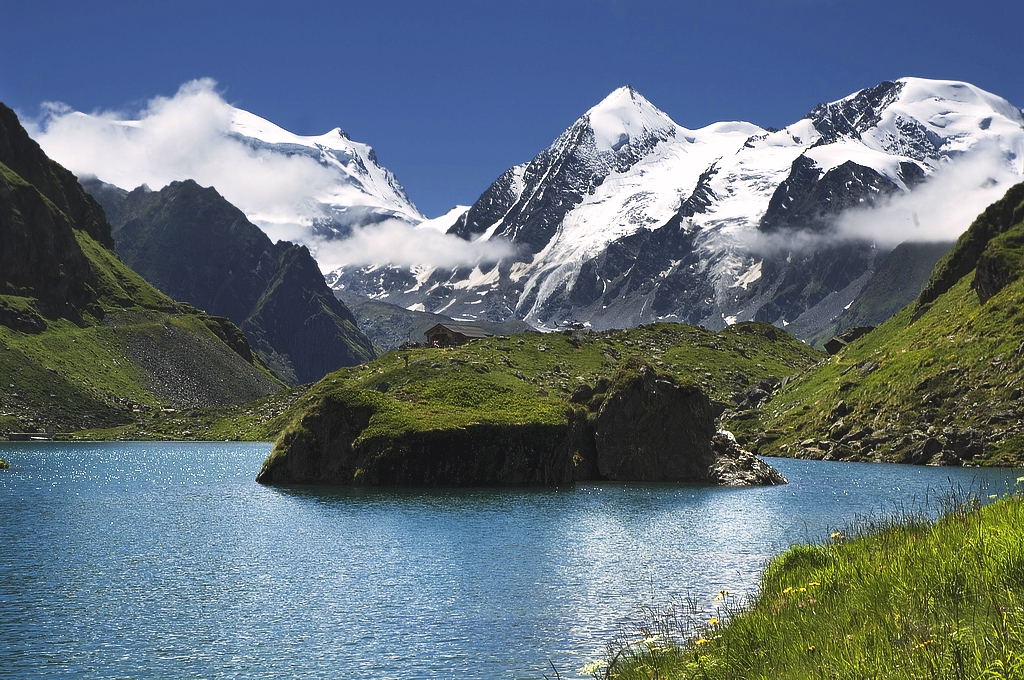
- Grand Combin (to the left, in clouds) and Petit Combin (far right) from Lac de Louvie

Highest point
- Elevation: 3,663 m (12,018 ft)
- Prominence: 113 m (371 ft)
- Parent peak: Combin de Corbassière
- Coordinates: 45°59′07″N 7°16′06″E

Geography
- Location within Switzerland
- Location: Valais, Switzerland
- Parent range: Pennine Alps

The Petit Combin is a mountain of the Swiss Pennine Alps, located between the valleys of Entremont and Bagnes in the canton of Valais. It belongs to the Grand Combin massif.

The Petit Combin is a popular destination for heliskiing and snow landing.
