= Thyon =

Ski resort in Switzerland

Coordinates: 46°10′55″N 7°22′21″E

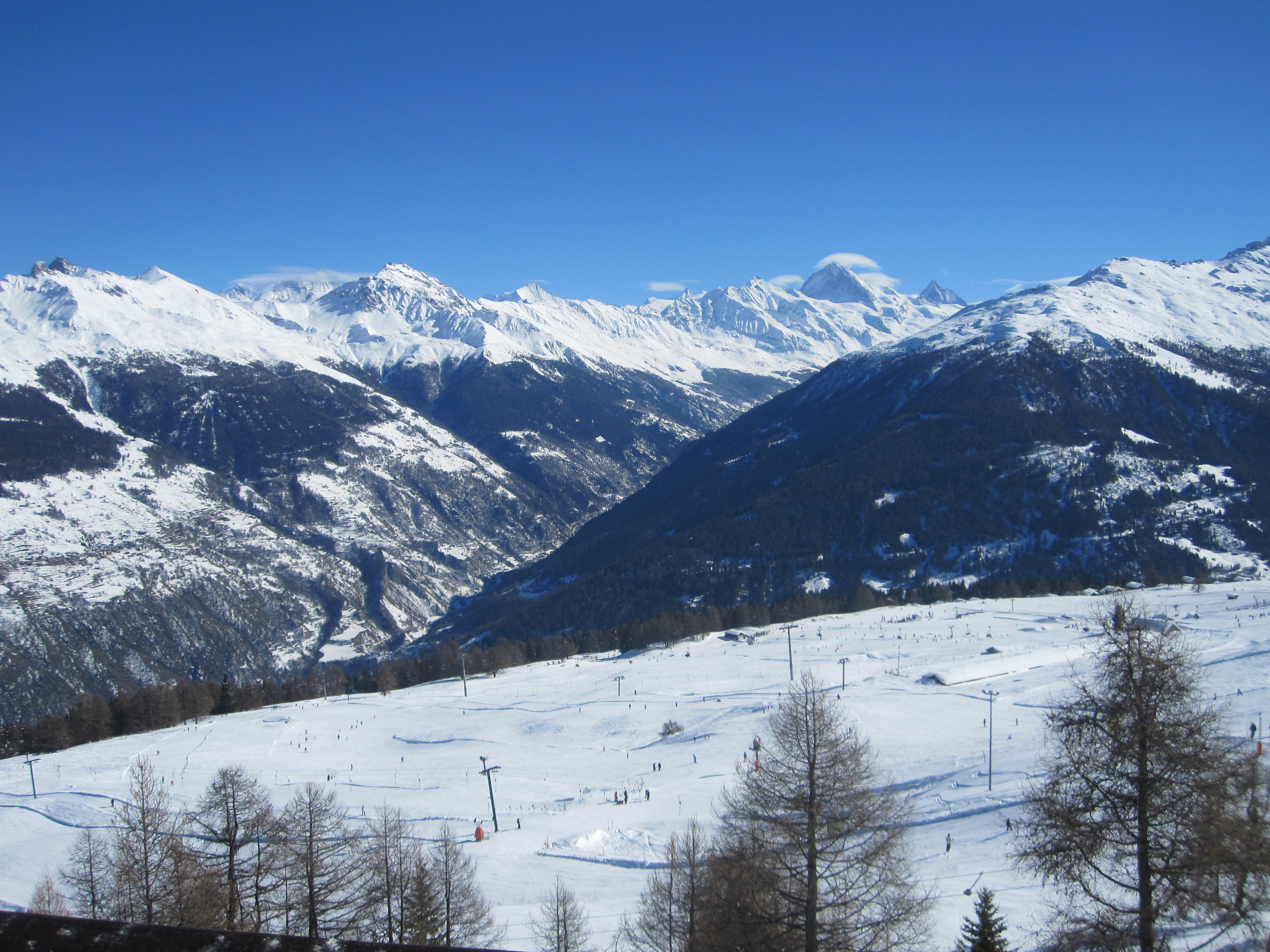
Some Thyon ski pistes (showing alpage cow barn under snow), Dent Blanche and Matterhorn in distance

Thyon (also known as Thyon 2000) is a purpose-built ski resort in the Swiss Alps, located in the canton of Valais. The resort is situated in the central part of the canton, in the region of Sion, and is associated with the village of Les Collons. It forms part of the "4 Valleys" interlinked ski area, which together includes Thyon, Veysonnaz, Haute-Nendaz, Verbier and La Tzoumaz. The ski pistes from Thyon and Veysonnaz effectively constitute a large, single integrated ski area, and connect with the rest of the "4 Valleys" area.

Thyon lies at a height of 2,095 metres above sea level, on the ridge descending from Mont Rouge. The 'Thyon 2000' complex was constructed in the 1970s. Administratively, it lies in the municipality of Vex.

Some of the winter ski pistes descend across what in summertime is still an active "alpage" - an area of high mountain pasture grazed by cattle, including some Combat de Reines cows. Part of the local alpage cow barn has been converted to a seasonal restaurant. The alpage dairy produces cheese from the milk, some of which is sold in the adjacent village of Les Collons during the September "désalpe" festival - the ceremonious descent of the cows, often garlanded, to lower pastures.

Apart from winter sports and summer hiking, the resort has views of the Valais mountains, the so-called Pennine Alps, with direct views of six 4000+ metre peaks (Matterhorn, Dent Blanche, Obergabelhorn, Zinalrothorn, Weisshorn, Bishorn). A seventh, the Jungfrau, is visible in the Bernese Alps to the east.

In August, the annual trail race from Thyon to the Grande Dixence dam takes place. This is a 16 km run with 700m ascent/descent at an altitude averaging 2,000m and attracts around 1,000 competitors.

The resort is accessed by road from Sion, by chair-lifts from Les Masses and Les Collons, and by gondolas from Veysonnaz.

== Gallery ==
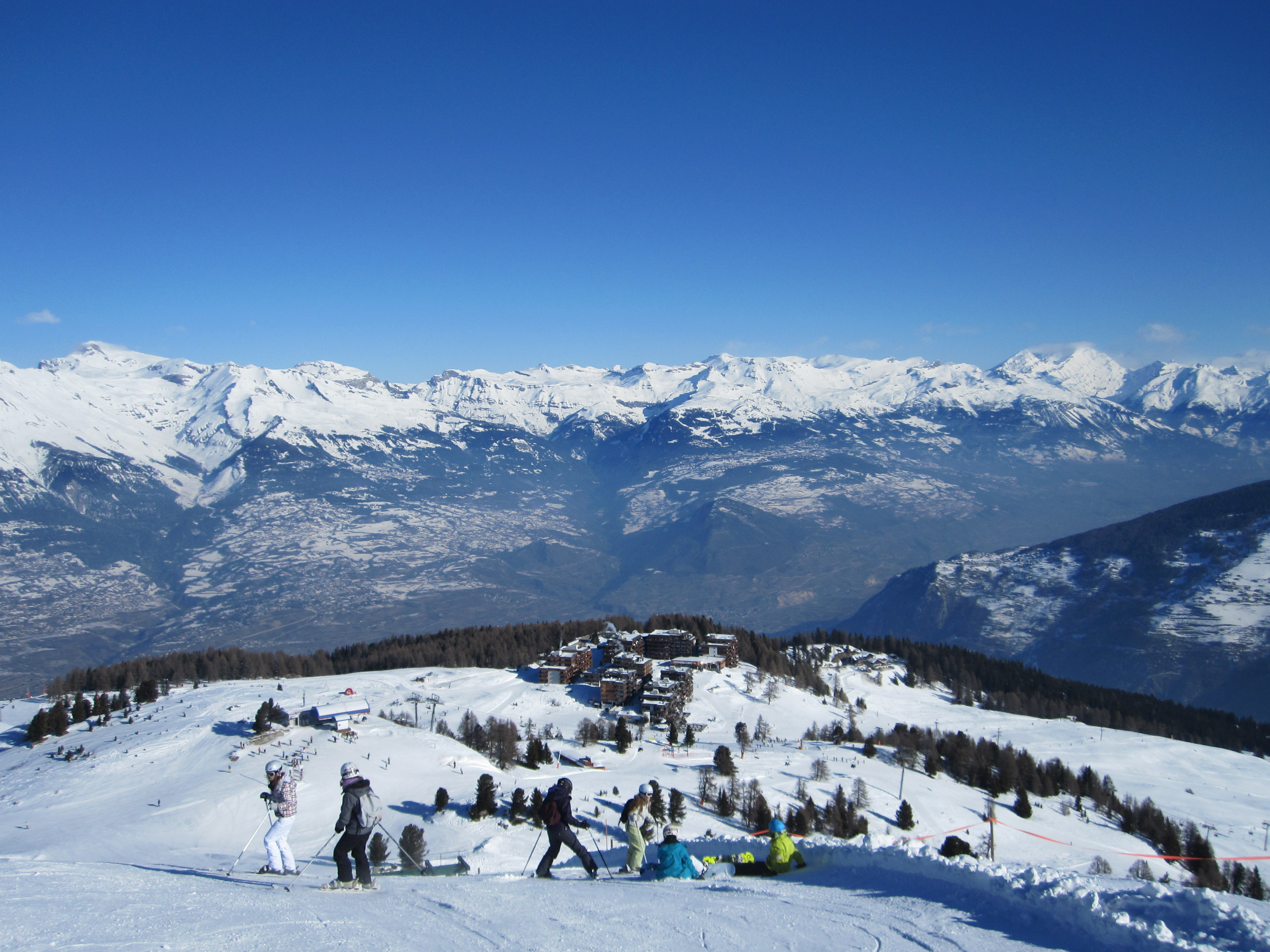
View of Thyon from above

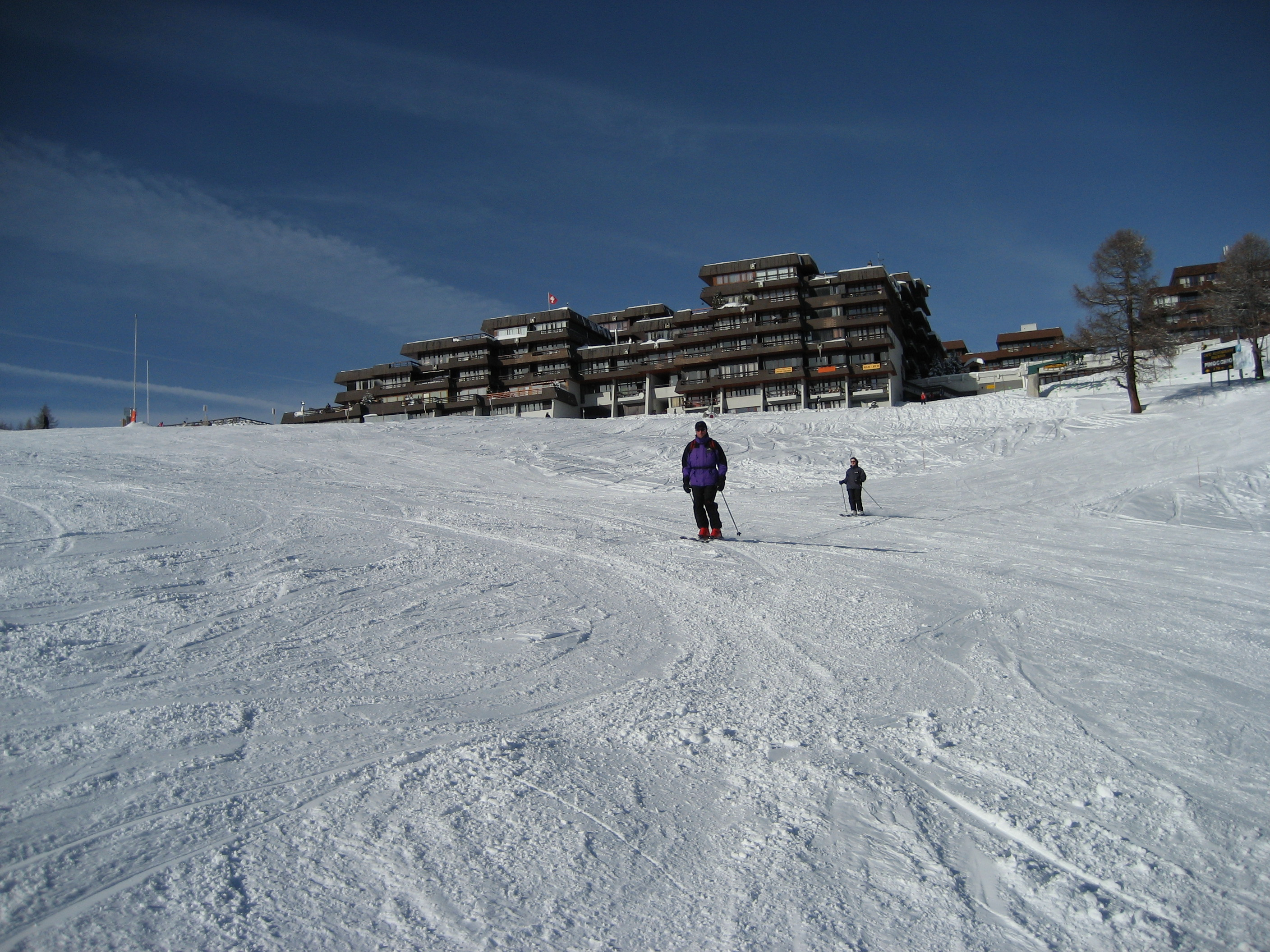
View of resort complex from the ski pistes

Summertime alpage, Thyon
