= Sophie Harmansdochter =

Dutch perjurer and informer

Sophie Harmansdochter, also known as Gele Fye (1505 – 3 March 1562), was a Dutch woman who became notorious for informing on religious minorities, resulting in many deaths. She was eventually convicted of perjury, tortured and executed.

== Informer for the mayor ==
Harmansdochter was the daughter of Harman Hoen, an Anabaptist preacher from Zwolle. She followed him on his preaching tours until his execution in 1534. After encountering difficulties in securing her inheritance after her father's death, Harmansdochter became an informer for the mayor of Amsterdam. She married a burgher in Amsterdam in 1537. Harmansdochter's information led to the arrest of Volckje Ward. This led to the arrests and executions of numerous Anabaptists, then considered heretics, in Amsterdam, Leiden, Friesland and Antwerp between 1552 and 1553.

== Arrest and execution ==
After the death of her husband, Harmansdochter experienced financial problems. To make money, she attempted to implicate the mayor as a heretic. However, her scheme failed. She was arrested and convicted of perjury. After having her tongue cut out, she was executed by burning.

Harmansdochter has often been portrayed in Dutch literature.
