= La Tzoumaz =

Ski resort in the Valais canton, Swiss Alps

La Tzoumaz / Savoleyres
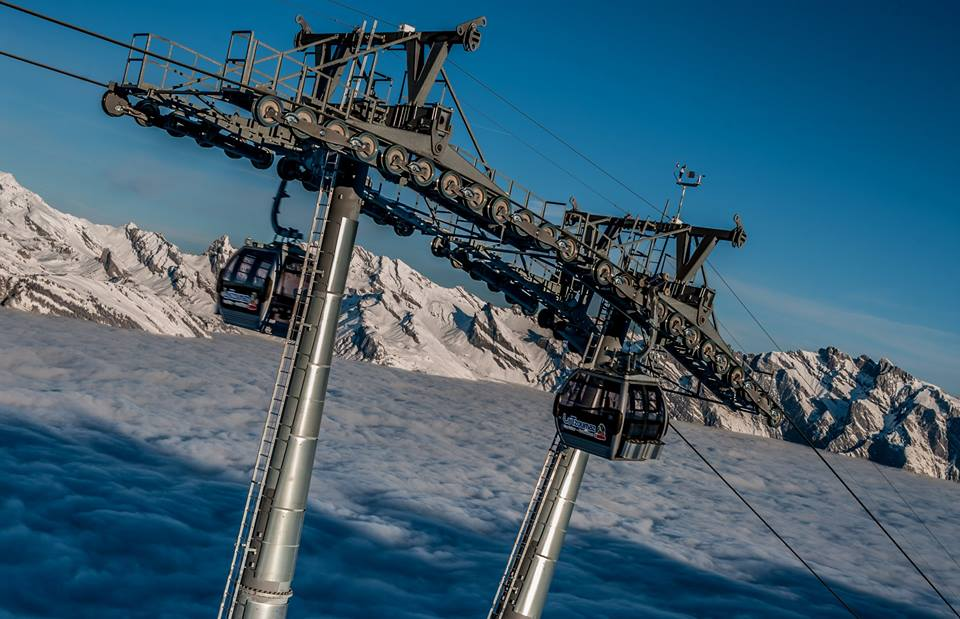
- Interactive map of La Tzoumaz / Savoleyres
- Location: Alpes valaisannes
- Nearest city: Sion
- Coordinates: 46.096025°N 7.229023°E
- Vertical: 819 m (2,687 ft)
- Top elevation: 2,354 m (7,723 ft)
- Base elevation: 1,535 m (5,036 ft)
- Trails: 18
- Total length: 55 km (34 mi)
- Snowmaking: Yes
- Night skiing: No
- Website: https://www.latzoumaz.ch/

La Tzoumaz (formally known as Les Mayens-de-Riddes) is a ski resort in the Swiss Alps, in the canton of Valais. It is part of the "Four Valleys" ski area, which consists of various ski resorts, including Verbier, Nendaz, Veysonnaz, La Tzoumaz, and Thyon. As such it has direct access to over 400 km of runs. Named after the word "tzoumer", meaning taking a break, La Tzoumaz nestles against the same mountain as Verbier, Mont Savoleyres, and is at the same altitude (1500m). However, unlike Verbier, it is situated on north-facing slopes and hence enjoys a longer ski-season, lasting from early December all the way through to late-April. The resort has splendid views over the Rhone valley from the side of a small sunny valley on the north side of Verbier.

Quieter than Verbier, it is a resort popular with families, having a small ski lift for children, a natural ice rink, a heated swimming pool and the longest sledge run in Western Switzerland (at 10 kilometres). The resort has a population of just over 400 and is popular with British, German and Dutch visitors as well as Swiss nationals.

== Geography ==
La Tzoumaz is located in a green valley above the Rhône, in the canton of Valais and has one main access road, which starts in the town of Riddes, 13 kilometres away (and at exit 24 of the Martigny motorway). La Tzoumaz is also at a base station of the Savolyres Cable Car, an 8-minute ride up and 11-minute ride down to Verbier.

Coordinates: 46.14470°N 7.23306°E.

== Resort in winter ==
The resort has 2 cable car lifts, 4 chairlifts and 1 children's ski lift. As of the 2025 ski season, a hybrid cable car and chairlift links Verbier to Savoleyres, to replace the existing the 4-person cable car which will be decommissioned by end of 2026. There are 12 ski runs with a total length 28 km (30% blue, 70% red), a natural ice rink and the Western Switzerland's longest tobbogan run (10 km long and a drop of 848m) which starts at the summit of the station (2,354m).

Lifts in the La Tzoumaz Ski Area
Lift	Type	Size (people)	Capacity (people per hour)	Build Year
200 Savoleyres	Cable car	4	800	1970
201 Tzoumaz	Cable car	8	1600	2007
203 Etablons	Chairlift	2	1200	1998
204 Taillay	Chairlift	4	1800	1996
205 Nord	Chairift	6	2400	2002
207 Tournelle	Chairlift	2	1360	1997
208 Piguet Galland	Hybrid Cable car/ Chairlift	6 (chair), 8 (cable car)	1000	2025

The resort is also directly linked to the Four Valleys ski area, with 98 more ski lifts and a total of 400 km of ski runs. The [Verbier] zone of the Four Valleys is renowned for its off-piste opportunities. In particular Tortin, Mont Fort, Valon D'Arbi and Creblet are popular excursions.

== Resort in summer ==
The village offers 1 outdoor tennis court, fishing, paragliding, mountain biking and climbing. It is situated on the Bisse du Saxon (part of a 19th-century irrigation system that offers 100 km of gently inclined paths suitable for walking and mountain biking). Within a short drive of the resort are many family, cultural and historical attractions including Lake Geneva, the Grande Dixence dam, the medieval town of Sion, Aqua park, Thermal Baths and underground salt mines.

The Verbier-La Tzoumaz Bikepark had 5 separate downhill tracks each with at least 700m of altitude drop.

The "maison de la Forêt" has exhibitions of local wildlife and a cafe serving local produce.

The Trail of the Senses allows you to discover nature through sight, touch, hearing, smell and taste.

Hikers can also discover the "bisses" and notably the bisse of Saxon. The small water channels have run through Valais since the Middle Ages bringing water from high in the mountains to the pastures below.

== Accommodation ==
As well as having 6 small guesthouses and hotels, there are 155 privately owned apartments and chalets.
