= Mont Fort =

Mountain in Switzerland

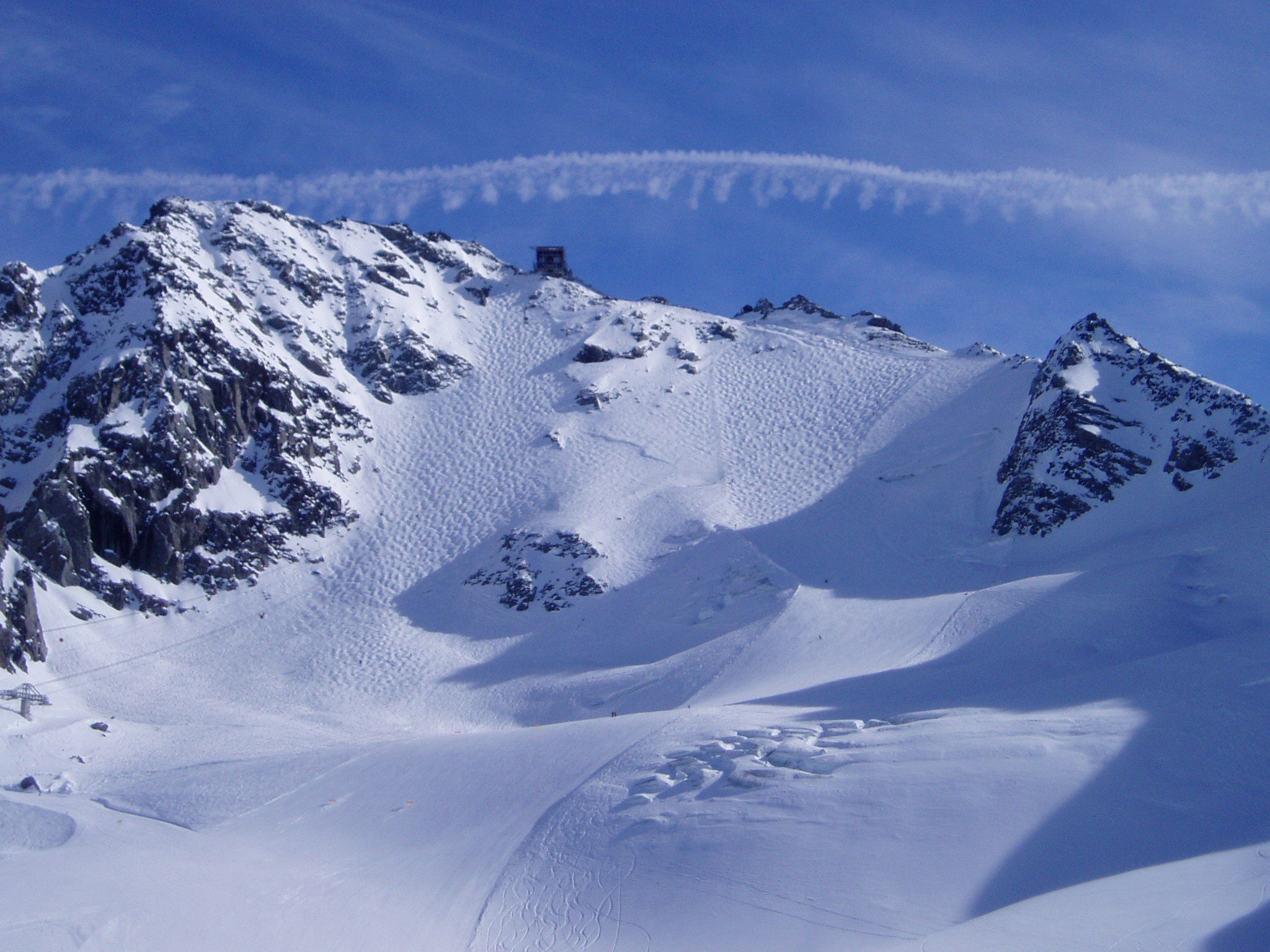
- North side with the Glacier de Tortin

Highest point
- Elevation: 3,328 m (10,919 ft)
- Prominence: 408 m (1,339 ft)
- Parent peak: Monte Rosa
- Isolation: 3.5 km (2.2 mi)
- Listing: Alpine mountains above 3000 m
- Coordinates: 46°04′50″N 07°19′07″E

Geography
- Location within Switzerland
- Location: Valais, Switzerland
- Parent range: Pennine Alps

Climbing
- Easiest route: Aerial tramway

Mont Fort is a mountain of the Pennine Alps, in the Swiss canton of Valais. It lies on the range between the valleys of Nendaz and Bagnes, north of the Rosablanche. With a summit elevation of 3,328 metres (10,919 ft) above sea level, Mont Fort is the highest peak north of the Col de Louvie (2,921 m or 9,583 ft).

Mont Fort is surrounded by several glaciers, the largest being the Glacier de Tortin, on its northwestern side. The second largest is the Glacier du Mont Fort, located on its northeastern side. On its eastern side lies the lower summit Petit Mont Fort (3,135 m or 10,285 ft). The Glacier du Petit Mont Fort lies between the two summits. There are no glaciers on the south side of the mountain. A small lake named Lac du Petit Mont Fort (2,764 m or 9,068 ft) lies on the south flank.

The summit of Mont Fort is easily accessible by cable car from the heights of Verbier or Nendaz. The cable cars from the two valleys converge at the intermediate station (2,894 m or 9,495 ft) north of the Col des Gentianes, the upper section reaching an elevation of 3,308 metres (10,853 ft). In the winter and early spring season, the mountain, including the Glacier de Tortin, is the culminating point of the 4 Vallées ski area, accessible by the "Mont-Fort" cable car. There is one ski slope leading down from the mountain's peak – which then leads down to the Col des Gentianes, where a restaurant and two cable cars leading down to Verbier and Siviez (Haute-Nendaz) are situated.

== Accessibility ==
As above, the mountain is accessible from the '4 Vallées' ski area, made up of La Tzoumaz, Verbier, Haute-Nendaz, Veysonnaz and Thyon, each interconnected with ski lifts, managed by each ski resort's separate lift operators (apart from Nendaz & Veysonnaz, who have recently merged their lift operators to form 'NVRM'). Mont-Fort lies between the Verbier and Nendaz (both of which are easily accessible by road).

== See also ==
- List of mountains of Switzerland accessible by public transport
- Verbier 4Vallées ski area - https://verbier4vallees.ch/en/ski-resort
- Verbier - http://verbier.ch
- Nendaz - http://nendaz.ch
- 4 Vallées - http://4vallees.ch
