= Verbier =

Swiss village

Coordinates: 46°06′N 7°13′E

- Former municipality
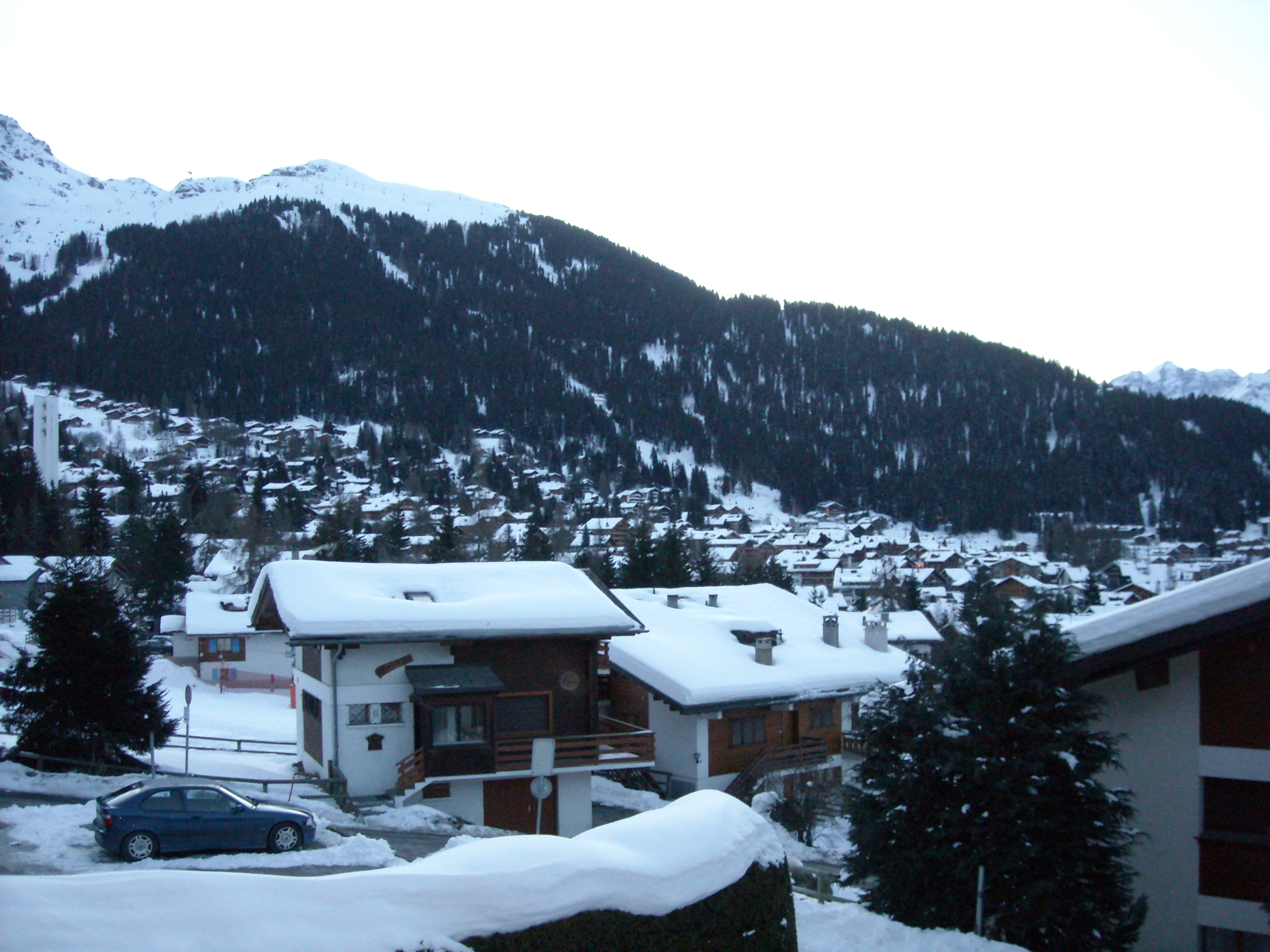
- Location of Verbier
- Location within Switzerland Location within Canton of Valais
- Country: Switzerland
- Canton: Valais
- District: Entremont
- Municipality: Val de Bagnes
- Elevation: 1,500 m (4,900 ft)
- Highest elevation (Bec des Rosses): 3,222 m (10,571 ft)

Population (July 2020)
  - Total: 2,901
- Time zone: UTC+01:00 (CET)
  - Summer (DST): UTC+02:00 (CEST)
- Postal code: 1936
- Website: https://www.verbier.ch/

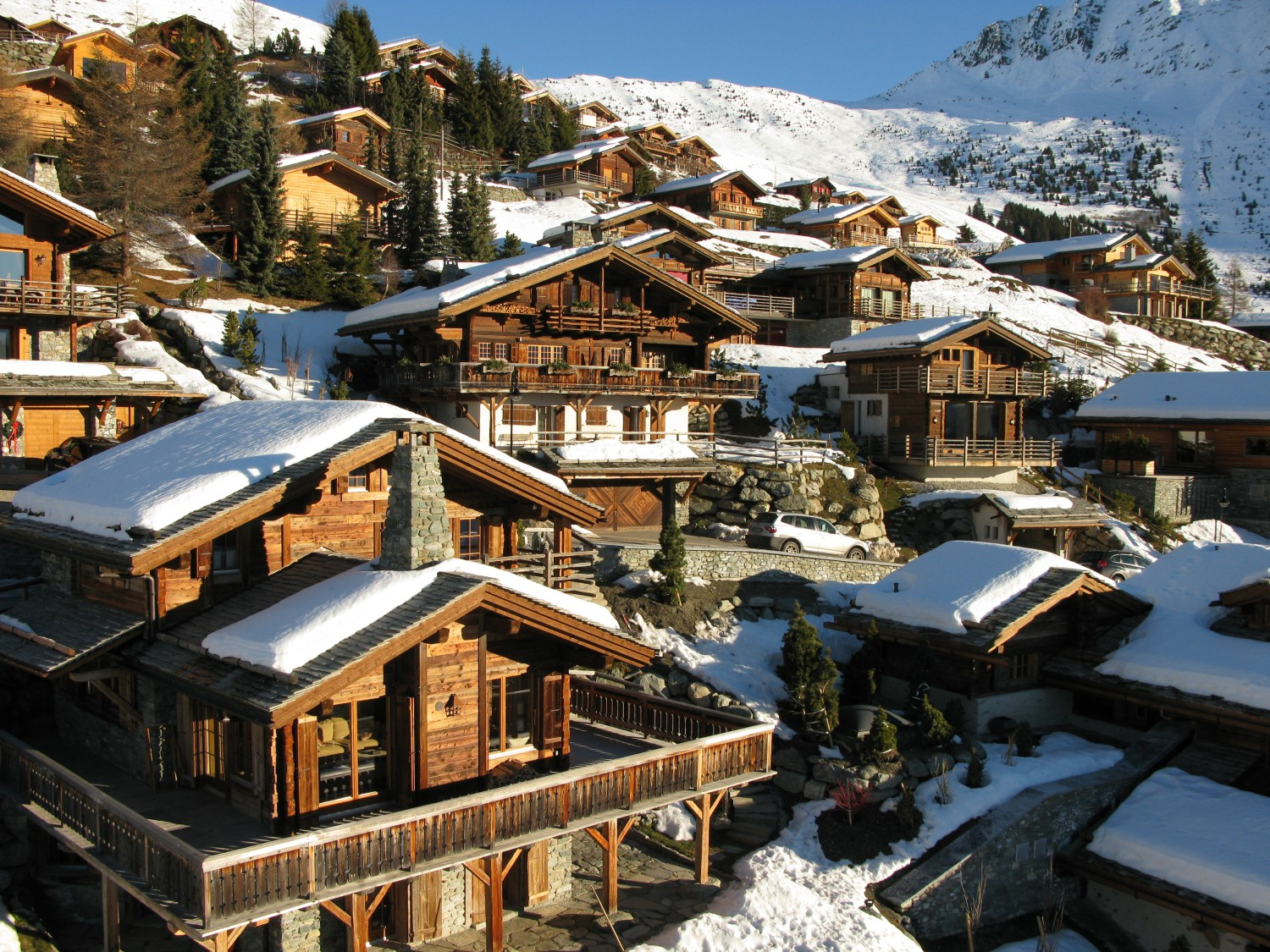
Verbier

Verbier (French pronunciation: [vɛʁbje]) is a village located in south-western Switzerland in the canton of Valais. It is a holiday resort and ski area in the Swiss Alps and is recognised as one of the premier off-piste resorts in the world. Skiers have settled in the Verbier area in order to take advantage of the steep slopes, varied conditions, and resort culture.

== Geography ==
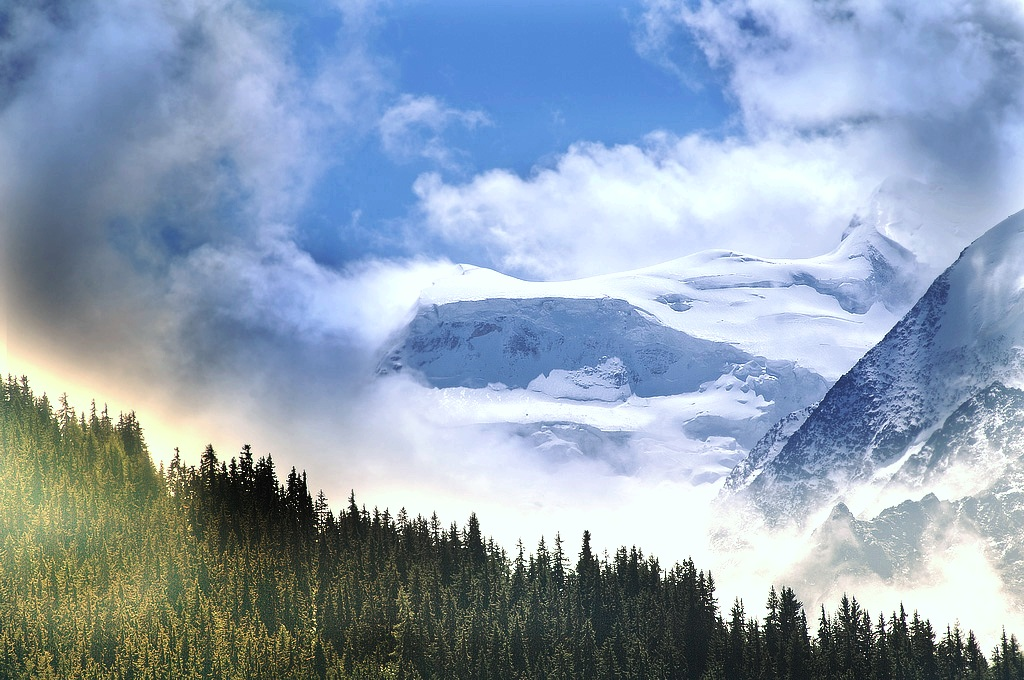
Glaciers of Grand Combin seen from Verbier

Aerial view (1966)

Verbier is located in the municipality of Val de Bagnes in the Swiss canton of Valais. The village lies on a south oriented terrace at around 1,500 metres facing the Grand Combin massif. The terrace lies on the east side of the Val de Bagnes, a valley located south of Martigny.

Verbier had 2767 permanent residents in 2006. The number of residents can rise to 35,000 in the winter season. There is a noticeable population of Scandinavian and British residents.

=== Education ===
The town has a state school system for its residents up to secondary school level, when locals have to travel down into the valley for their school education. In September 2010, the Verbier campus of St. George's (now called Verbier International School), a private international school, was founded and opened its doors in the Chalet Mascotte at the entrance of the village. Verbier International School (VIS) also merged with Copperfield Verbier in 2026, which now both share a newly built campus in Rue de Centre Sportif and a boarding house, called Chalet Flore, in Rue de Medran

== History ==
Verbier has been an Alpine resort with guests from European countries since the early 20th century. During World War I, the local economy suffered from a lack of tourist revenue as people were unable or unwilling to travel to Switzerland from countries at war. From 1916 to 1918, Verbier, along with other Alpine resorts, housed interned German, French and British soldiers who required medical treatment.

== Artists and photographers ==
There is a community of photographers and artists in Verbier, most born out of winter sports action photography.

== Transport ==
Verbier can be accessed by road or by train. From Martigny a regional train (known as the Saint-Bernard Express) leads to Le Châble VS. From Le Châble a cable car (or a post bus) goes up to Verbier. Martigny is a 1 hour 45 minute journey from Geneva and a 20 min journey from Sion, travelling with Swiss Federal Railways.

Verbier has only one access road which starts in the town of Le Châble. From Sembrancher (near Le Châble) a road leads to the Great St. Bernard Pass and another to Martigny or to the Col de la Forclaz. Verbier is about 2 hours' drive from Geneva, 1 hour from Chamonix (Col de la Forclaz) and 1 hour from Aosta (Great St. Bernard Pass).

The nearest international airport is Geneva Airport. Minibus transfers are available from the airport to Verbier centre during the winter ski season.

The village is small enough to be explored on foot, but free buses run throughout the resort regularly during the day.

== Skiing ==
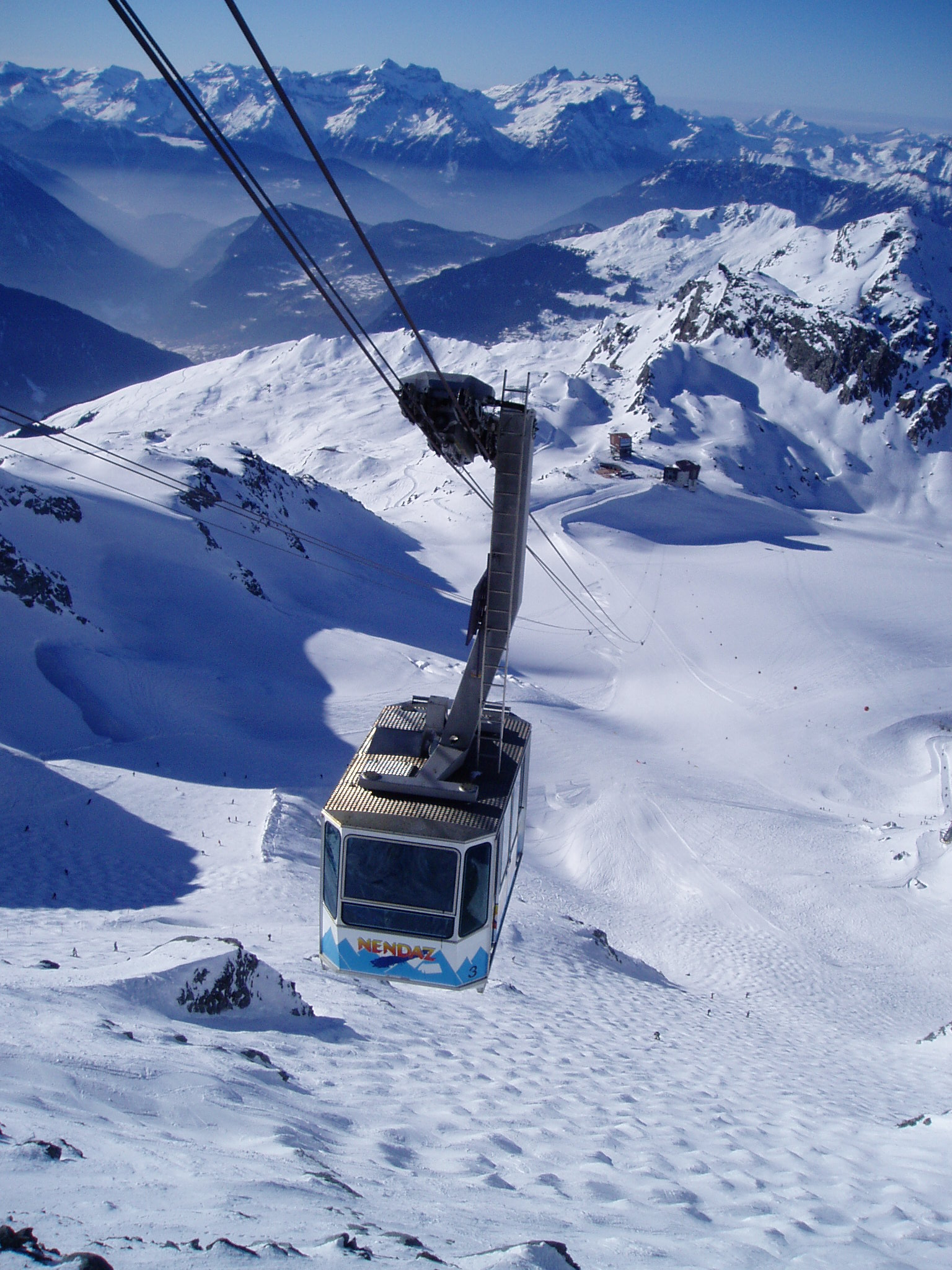
Mont Fort cable car

Verbier's ski domain ranges from 1,500 m (Verbier Village) up to 3,330 m (Mont Fort) from which there is a panoramic view of the Alps encompassing the Matterhorn Cervin, Dom, Dent Blanche, Dent d'Hérens, Grand Combin and Mont Blanc massif. It is part of the "Four Valleys" ("4 Vallées") ski area, which includes the ski resorts of Verbier, Nendaz, Veysonnaz, La Tzoumaz, and Thyon with a claimed total of 410 km marked runs. However, an independent expert measured that the real extent of marked runs is 164 km rather than 410 km.

The ski area is divided into four sectors: Medran, Les Savoleyres, Mont Fort and Bruson. Verbier forms the western section of the 4 valleys ski area. A 4 Valley pass allows a tour all the way from Verbier to La Tzoumaz, Nendaz, Veysonnaz, Les Masses, Thyon and back.

The Verbier section of the 4 Valleys ski area has recent lifts made by Leitner, CWA, Poma and Garaventa AG, all operated by Téléverbier SA. In Verbier alone, there are 35 lifts (within the Verbier, Savoleyeres/La Tzoumaz and Bruson sector). A standard Verbier pass gives access to this entire sector, 33 standard ski runs, two snowparks, one "Jardin de Neige" (a relatively flat area that is used for small children learning to ski), four cross-country pistes and two walking areas.

=== Off-piste ===
Verbier is known for its off-piste and itinerary runs. Amongst these are popular mogul fields Tortin, Gentianes, Mont Fort and Plan du Fou as well as more advanced itineraries Vallon D'Arbi and Mont Gelé (which are often closed). Notable off-piste runs are the Backside of Mont Fort, Bec des Etagnes, Stairway to Heaven, Highway, Marlenaz, Croix de Coeur, Bacombe, Col des Mines, Creblets, Couloir de la Banane, Col de la Mouche, The Rocky Garden, The Hidden Valley (down to Auddes-sur-Riddes), Couloir des Dix, Col de la Banane, and the less accessible Bec des Rosses, annual host for the finals of the Freeride World Tour. Off-piste skiing can be dangerous, and sometimes lethal, due to the risk of avalanches, hidden obstacles, crevices, extremely steep runs, and other hazards. In the 2012–13 season, a skier was killed by an avalanche on the Col de la Mouche and two others died at the Bec des Etagnes.

Verbier is one of only a few resorts to contain a mountain with no pistes coming down it (Mont Gelé). On rare occasions, it is also possible to ski 700 vertical metres from Verbier (1500 m) to Le Châble (800 m) in the valley below, though such a run now entails going through terrain with felled trees and other obstacles. The off-piste run from Col des Gentiannes (2,950 m) down to Le Chable is a better option, but it is important to check that snow conditions are good and that there is no avalanche risk. Also, some of the trails from Col des Gentiannes to Le Châble lead to dead-ends and dangerous rockfaces, so it is essential to be familiar with the terrain before attempting to ski down to Le Châble from Gentiannes.

The nearest heli-ski landing spots are Rosablanche, Petit Combin, and Trient Glacier.

Verbier is a stop on the most commonly taken route by skiers of the Haute Route from Chamonix to Zermatt.

=== Ski and snowboard schools ===
Various ski and snowboard schools offer private lessons, group lessons, clinics, and performance coaching. Mountain-guide companies and a few independent mountain guides complete the offerings. Ski and snowboard schools include Performance Verbier, Alpinemojo Ski and Snowboard School, La Fantastique, Altitude Ski and Snowboard School, New Generation Ski School, European Snowsport and the Swiss Ski School.

=== Summer skiing ===
In 1983, 2 T-bar lifts were installed on the glacier to allow skiing all year. The lifts took 7 minutes and 30 seconds to ride and had a rate of 2,400 people per hour. The summer skiing last operated during July 1999.

In April 2012, the website SeeVerbier.com published a report as part of an April fools joke claiming that the resort would re-open for summer skiing during June.

As a result of exceptional weather conditions, Verbier was able to offer skiing on 13 and 14 July 2013. 1,630 people attended the event.

== Summer ==
In the summertime, there are 400 km of hiking trails and hikers can follow the tracks of the chamois and ibex through the mountains, some of them covered with snow all year round. There are 200 km of mountain bike piste. Other activities include climbing, paragliding, swimming, golf, badminton, Ice karting, and trips aboard the mountain railways in the area. Every summer, the Verbier Festival takes place, featuring seventeen days of musical performances at the invitation of founder Martin Engström.

== Society ==
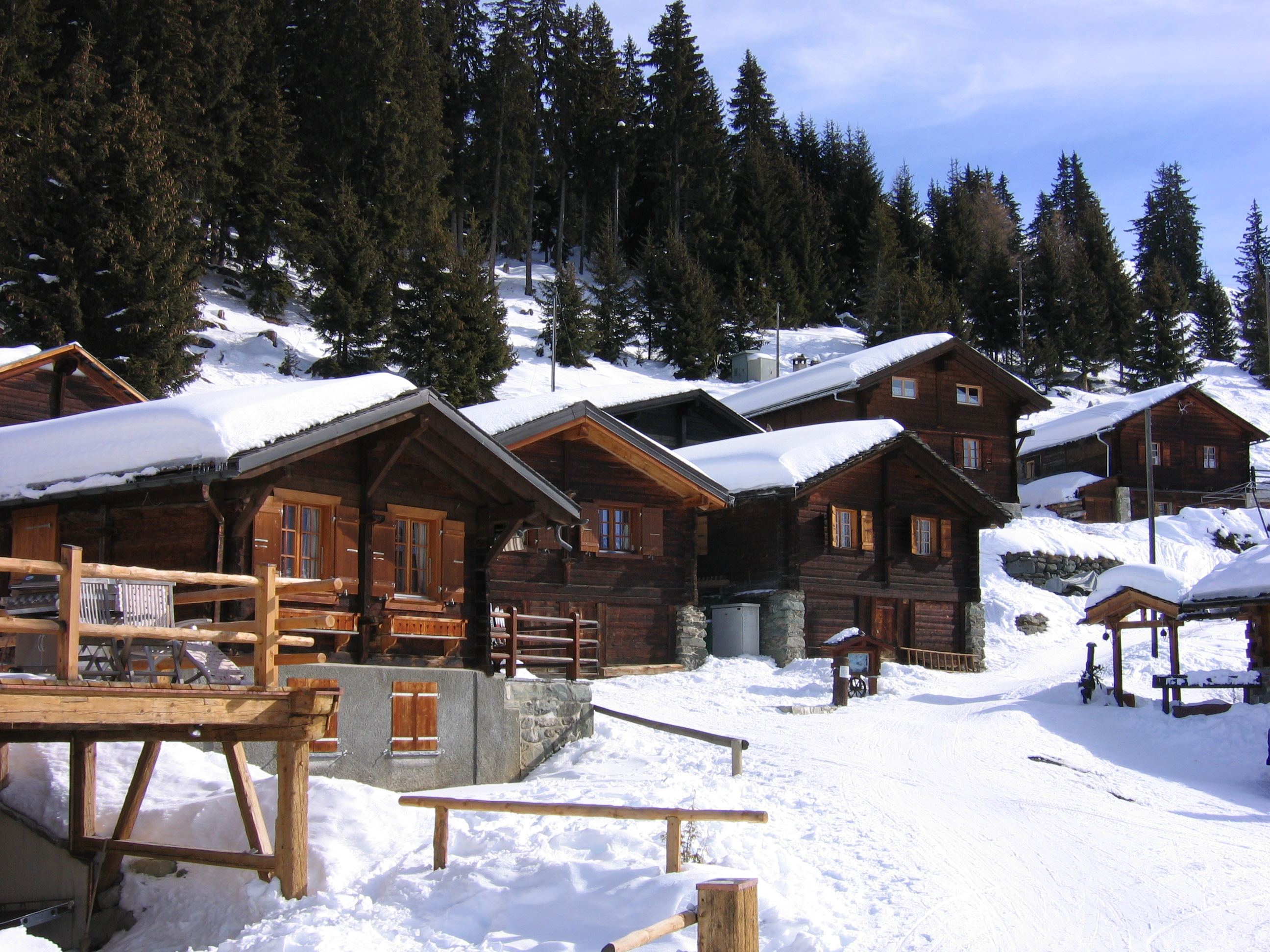
Chalets in Verbier

Verbier is also a popular holiday destination for celebrities and royalty, including the Prince and Princess of Wales, Prince Harry, Duke of Sussex, Sarah Ferguson (who is in the process of selling her chalet) and her daughters, Princesses Beatrice and Eugenie, James Blunt, Diana Ross, Lawrence Dallaglio, Richard Branson, Rosie Huntington-Whiteley, and Frederik X and Queen Mary of Denmark. The Swedish royal family and the Belgian royal family also come here. It caters to British customers, but also receives many visitors from Germany, Norway, Sweden, the Netherlands, Italy, Belgium, France, Austria, the United States of America and South Africa.

== Events ==
Recurring events include:

- the most prestigious extreme skiing and snowboarding contest, the Xtreme Verbier which is the final of the FWT
- the XSpeedski, FIS World Championship + Pro Race
- the Patrouille des Glaciers, ski mountaineering race every second year at the end of the ski season
- the Verbier Festival, Appraised international music festival
- the Grand Raid Cristalp, Mountain bike race Verbier - Grimentz
- the Grand Concours Hippique, a horse show featuring Grand Prix show jumping qualifiers
- Exercise White Knight, the British Army's RAC & AAC Downhill Championships and race training camp since 1983.
- Polaris Festival, Electronic Music Festival.

=== Other events ===
- Stage 8, 2005 Tour de Suisse - Pablo Lastras
- Stage 6, 2008 Tour de Suisse - Kim Kirchen
- Stage 15, 2009 Tour de France - Alberto Contador
- Stage 8, 2014 Tour de Suisse - Esteban Chaves

== Notable residents ==
- Paddy McNally, Formula One businessman and socialite
- Richard Branson (born 1950), British business magnate
- James Blunt (born 1974), English singer, songwriter, musician, and record producer
- George Downing (born 1963), property magnate
- Raymond Fellay (1932–1994), Swiss Olympic alpine skier
- Itamar Biran (born 1998), Israeli Olympic alpine ski racer
- Christopher Wood, Jefferies Global Head of Strategy
- Bear Grylls, British adventurer and television presenter
