= Mont Gelé (Bagnes) =

Mountain of the Pennine Alps

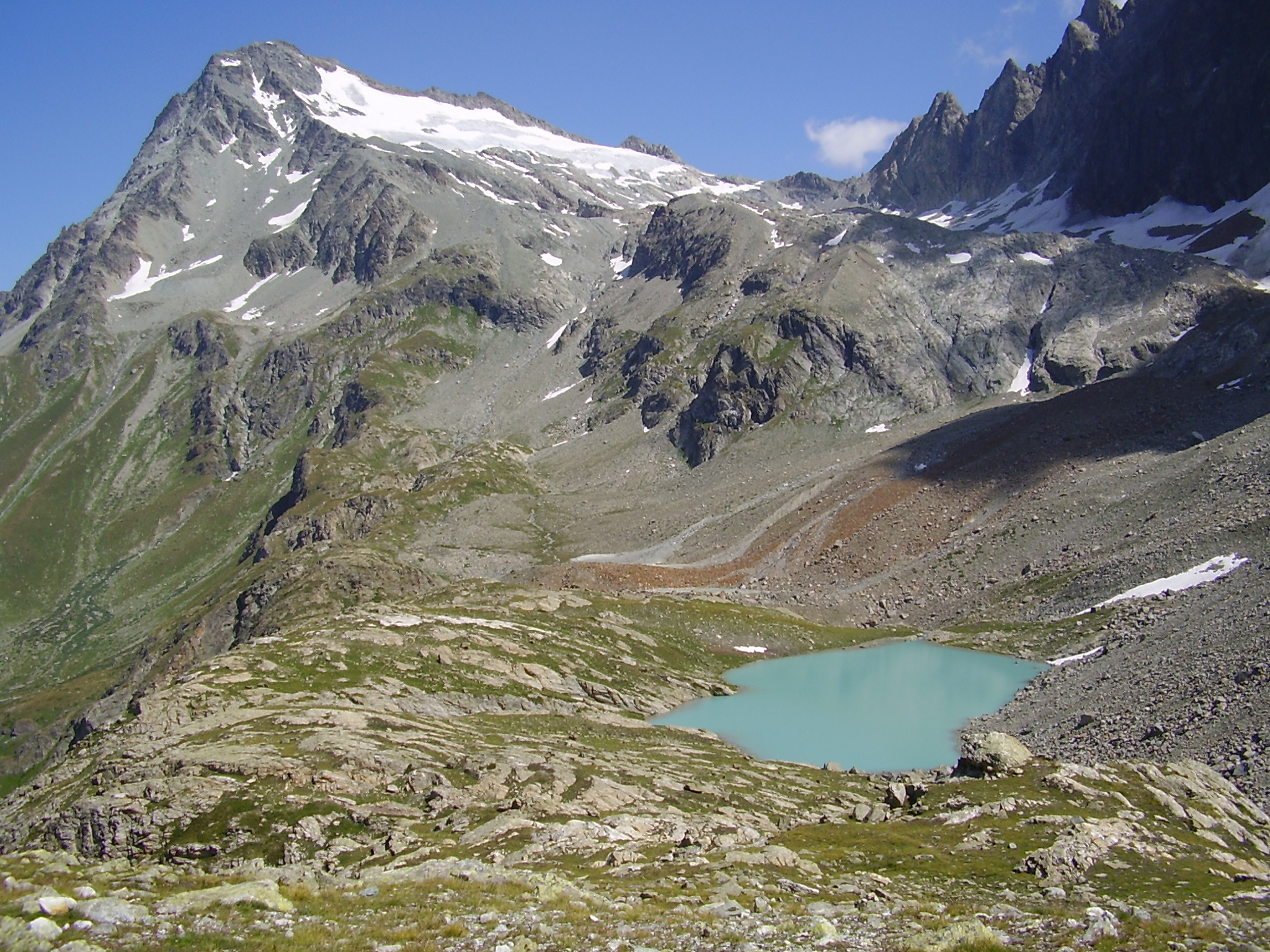
- Mont Gelé (left) from the Regondi hut

Highest point
- Elevation: 3,518 m (11,542 ft)
- Prominence: 622 m (2,041 ft)
- Isolation: 4.5 km (2.8 mi)
- Listing: Alpine mountains above 3000 m
- Coordinates: 45°54′15″N 7°21′58″E

Geography
- Location within Alps
- Location: Valais, Switzerland; Aosta Valley, Italy
- Parent range: Pennine Alps

Mont Gelé (3,518 m) is a mountain of the Pennine Alps, located on the border between Switzerland (canton of Valais) and Italy (region of Aosta Valley). It lies between the valleys of Bagnes and Valpelline, on the main Alpine watershed. It overlooks the Fenêtre de Durand from the east side.

It is one of the two mountains named Mont Gelé surrounding the valley of Bagnes, the other being located near Verbier.

== See also ==
- Refuge Crête Sèche
