= Boveire Glacier =

Glacier in Switzerland

Coordinates: 45°58′4″N 7°15′35″E

The Boveire Glacier (French: Glacier de Boveire) is a 2 km long glacier (2005) situated in the Pennine Alps in the canton of Valais in Switzerland. In 1973 it had an area of 2.08 km^{2}.

== See also ==
- List of glaciers in Switzerland
- Swiss Alps
