= Fionnay =

Village in the Swiss Alps

Coordinates: 46°01′58″N 7°18′28″E

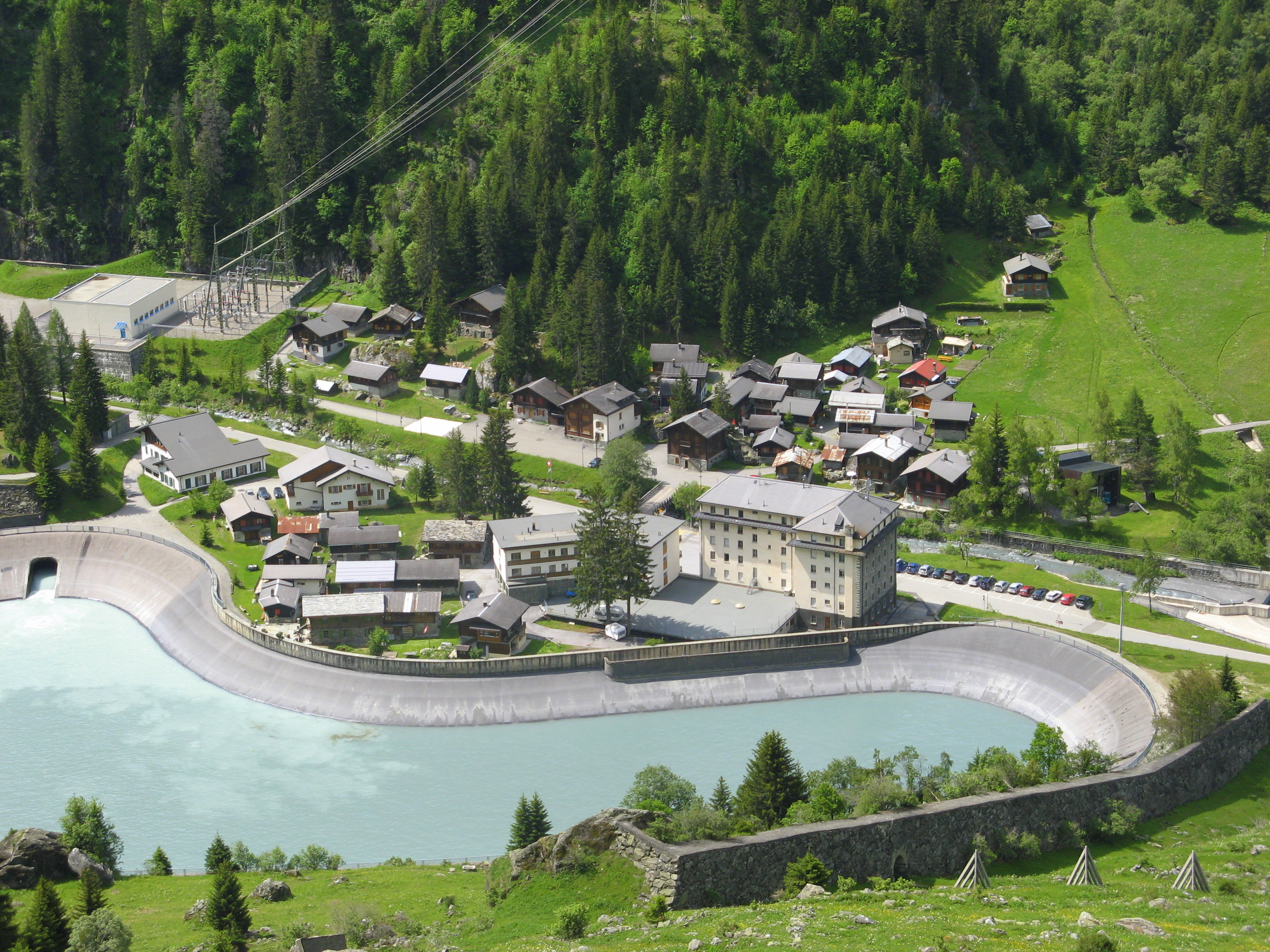
View of Fionnay and the power station

Fionnay is a village in the Swiss Alps, located in the canton of Valais. The village is situated in the western part of the canton, in the valley of Bagnes, south-east of Martigny. It is part of the municipality of Val de Bagnes.

Fionnay lies at a height of 1,490 metres above sea level and is the last important settlement of the valley. The village is located at the foot of the Corbassière Glacier of the Grand Combin massif.

== Demographics ==
Fionnay has a population (as of January 1, 2023) of 31.
