= Corbassière Glacier =

Glacier in Switzerland

- Glacier de Corbassière
- Grand Combin with the Corbassière Glacier in the lower part of the image
- Interactive map of Corbassière Glacier
- Type: Vallety glacier
- Location: Valais, Switzerland
- Coordinates: 45°59′25″N 7°15′50″E
- Area: 17.4 km^{2}
- Length: 9.8 km

The Corbassière Glacier (French: Glacier de Corbassière) is a valley glacier in the Grand Combin massif in the Pennine Alps in southwestern Valais. It is 9.8 km (6.1 mi) long with an average width of slightly more than 1 km (0.62 mi) and covers an area of 17.4 km^{2} (6.7 sq mi).

The origin of Corbassière Glacier is on the northern slope of the Grand Combin at over 4,000 m (13,000 ft) above sea level. The glacier tongue currently ends at around 2,300 m (7,500 ft) above sea level.

On the right side of the lower section of the glacier, the Cabane François-Xavier Bagnoud ([kaban fʁɑ̃swa ɡzavje baɲu]; 2645 m above sea level) belonging to the Swiss Alpine Club is a starting point for ascents and glacier tours in the Grand Combin massif.

== See also ==
- List of glaciers in Switzerland
- List of glaciers
- Retreat of glaciers since 1850
- Swiss Alps
