= Grand Combin =

Mountain massif in the western Pennine Alps, in the Swiss canton of Valais

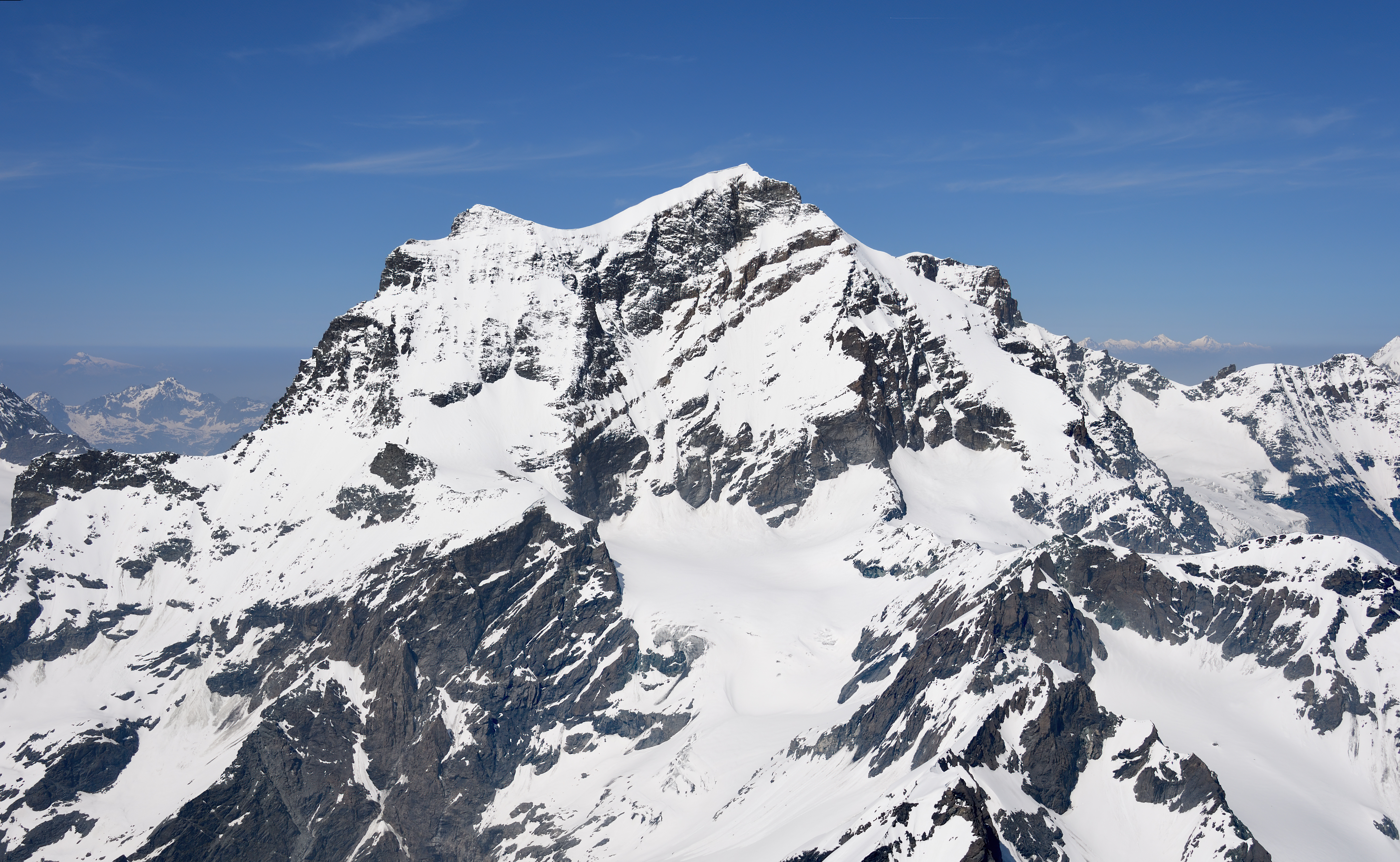
- South side

Highest point
- Peak: Combin de Grafeneire
- Elevation: 4,309 m (14,137 ft)
- Prominence: 1512 m ↓ Fenêtre de Durand
- Parent peak: Monte Rosa
- Isolation: 26.4 km → Dent Blanche
- Listing: Ultra; Alpine four-thousanders
- Coordinates: 45°56′15″N 7°17′57″E

Geography
- Location within Switzerland
- Country: Switzerland
- Canton: Valais
- Parent range: Pennine Alps
- Topo map: Swisstopo 1346 Chanrion

Climbing
- First ascent: July 30, 1859

The Grand Combin is a mountain massif in the western Pennine Alps in the canton of Valais. At a height of 4,309 metres (14,137 ft) the summit of Combin de Grafeneire is one of the highest peaks in the Alps and the second most prominent of the Pennine Alps. The Grand Combin is also a large glaciated massif consisting of several summits, among which three are above 4000 metres (Combin de Grafeneire 4,309 m (14,137 ft), Combin de Valsorey 4,184 m (13,727 ft), Combin de la Tsessette 4,132 m (13,556 ft)). The highest part of the massif is wholly in Switzerland, although the border with Italy lies a few kilometres south.

The normal route starts from the Panossière Hut, which lies on the north side in the Corbassière valley. Despite the fact that no major difficulties exist, a particularly dangerous passage has to be traversed on the north flank: Le Corridor. It is a couloir dominated by seracs continuously falling on it.

== Geography ==
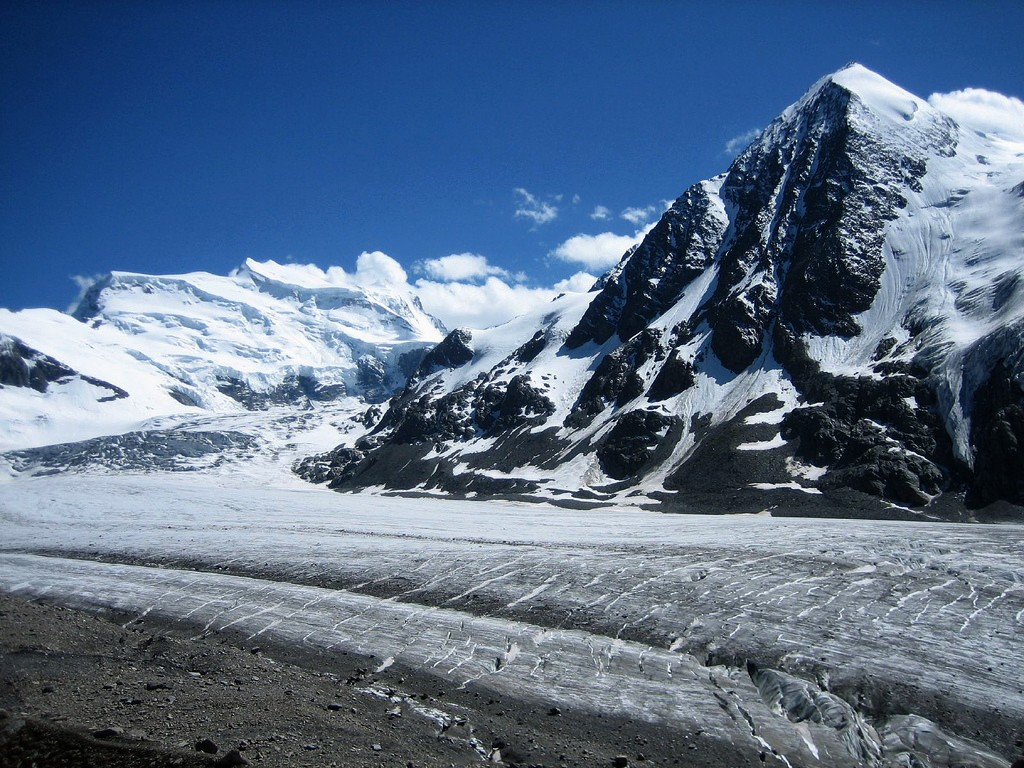
Corbassière Valley: Grand Combin (left) and Combin de Corbassière (right)

The massif of the Grand Combin lies in Lower Valais, south of Verbier between the Val d'Entremont (west) and Val de Bagnes (west). The north-western facing side of Grand Combin is entirely covered by eternal snows and glaciers which are prone to serac falls. The southern and eastern walls are more steep and thus exempt of snow.

Aerial view of the Grand Combin and the Corbassière Glacier

The topography of the Grand Combin is intricate. Between the Val d'Entremont and the Val de Bagnes are two high ridges, nearly parallel to each other and to those valleys, which both diverge from a short transverse ridge of great height. The southern end of the space enclosed between these three ridges is an elevated plateau of great extent, where the snows accumulate and feed the Corbassière Glacier which descends thence for about ten kilometers to the north. The glacier is surrounded by the peaks of Petit Combin, Combin de Corbassière and Combin de Boveire on the west, Grand Tavé and Tournelon Blanc on the east. Smaller glaciers lie on the external flanks such as Boveire and Mont Durand Glacier.

At the south-east extremity of the plateau, the highest part of the enclosing ridge is surmounted by two conical summits, of which the higher south-west point (Grand Combin de Grafeneire) is 4,309 meters in height, while the neighbouring north-east summit (Aiguille du Croissant) is lower by less than 60 meters (4,260 metres). Two other minor summits over 4,000 metres are located on the ridge: the Grand Combin de Valsorey (4184 m) on the west and the Combin de la Tsessette (4132 m) on the east. On the west side, the plateau sinks to a considerably lower level, and over this lies the Col des Maisons Blanches (3,418 m), by which access to the Corbassiere valley is obtained from the side of the Val d'Entremont.

All the waters flowing on the region end up in the Dranse river and the Rhone. After Dom, Weisshorn, it is the highest massif of the Alps situated out of the main chain. South of the Grand Combin, the ridge separating the glaciers of Mont Durand and Sonadon reaches the Grande Tête de By a few kilometres away, which is located on the main watershed and border with the Italian region of Aosta Valley. The ridge diverges to the south-west and appears to be continuous with the range of the Aiguilles Vertes, or Aiguilles de Valsorey, and that of Mont Vélan. From this branches the lower range, which divides the channel of the Glacier du Mont Durand (north) from the Val d'Ollomont in the Aosta Valley (south), and extends by the Col de Fenêtre to the Mont Gelé.

== Climbing history ==
The Grand Combin, which yields in height to only a few European mountains, was long one of the least known of Alpine summits. The first to commence the exploration of the great massif which separates the Val de Bagnes from the Val d'Entremont was Gottlieb Samuel Studer, of Berne, who on August 14, 1851 reached for the first time the summit of the Combin de Corbassière with the guide Joseph-Benjamin Fellay, and has published an account of that and a subsequent excursion in Bergund Gletscher-Fahrten. He was followed in that ascent five years later by W. and C. E. Mathews, and in 1857, William Mathews anticipated Studer in the ascent of the second peak of the Grand Combin.

The first four expeditions on Grand Combin reached only the minor summit east of Grand Combin (Aiguille du Croissant). The first one was made by mountain guides from the valley (Maurice Fellay and Jouvence Bruchez) on July 20, 1857. The first complete ascent of Grand Combin was finally made on July 30, 1859 by Charles Sainte-Claire Deville with Daniel, Emmanuel and Gaspard Balleys, and Basile Dorsaz.

The Grand Combin de Valsorey on the west was reached for the first time on 16 September 1872 by J. H. Isler and J. Gillioz. They climbed the south-west face above the Plateau du Couloir. The itinerary on the south-east ridge was opened on 10 September 1891 by O. Glynne Jones, A. Bovier and P. Gaspoz.

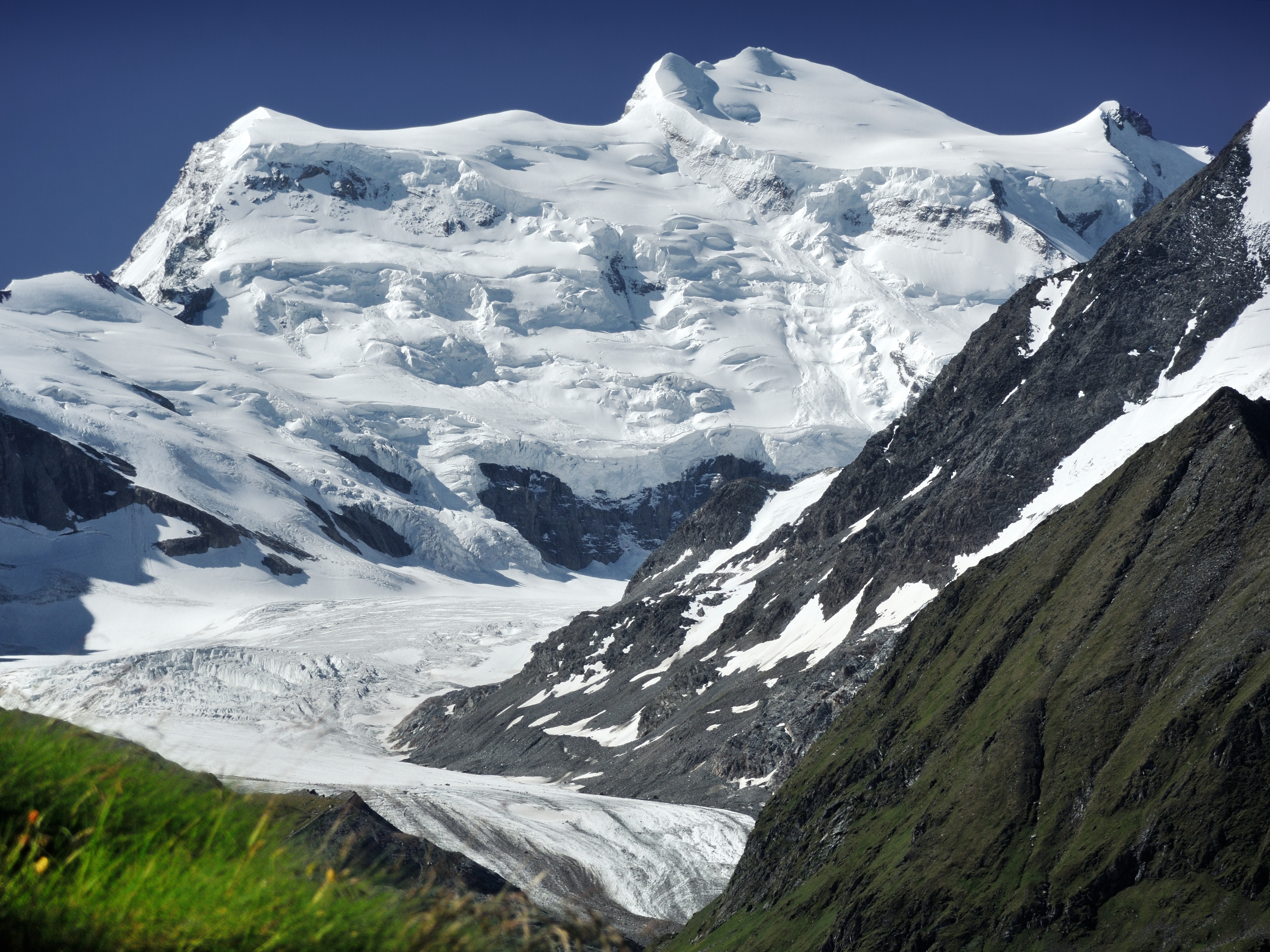
North side

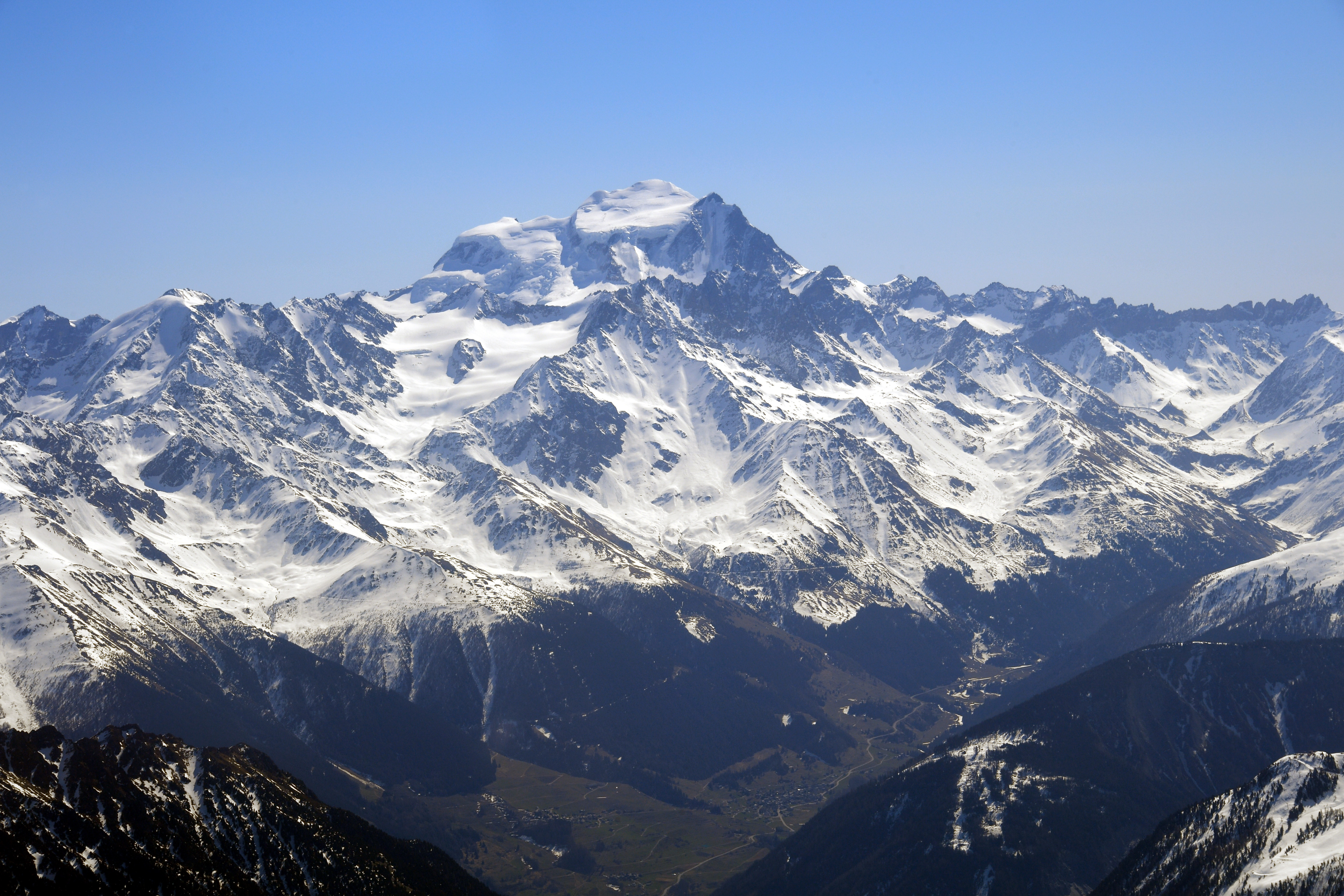
View from the northwest

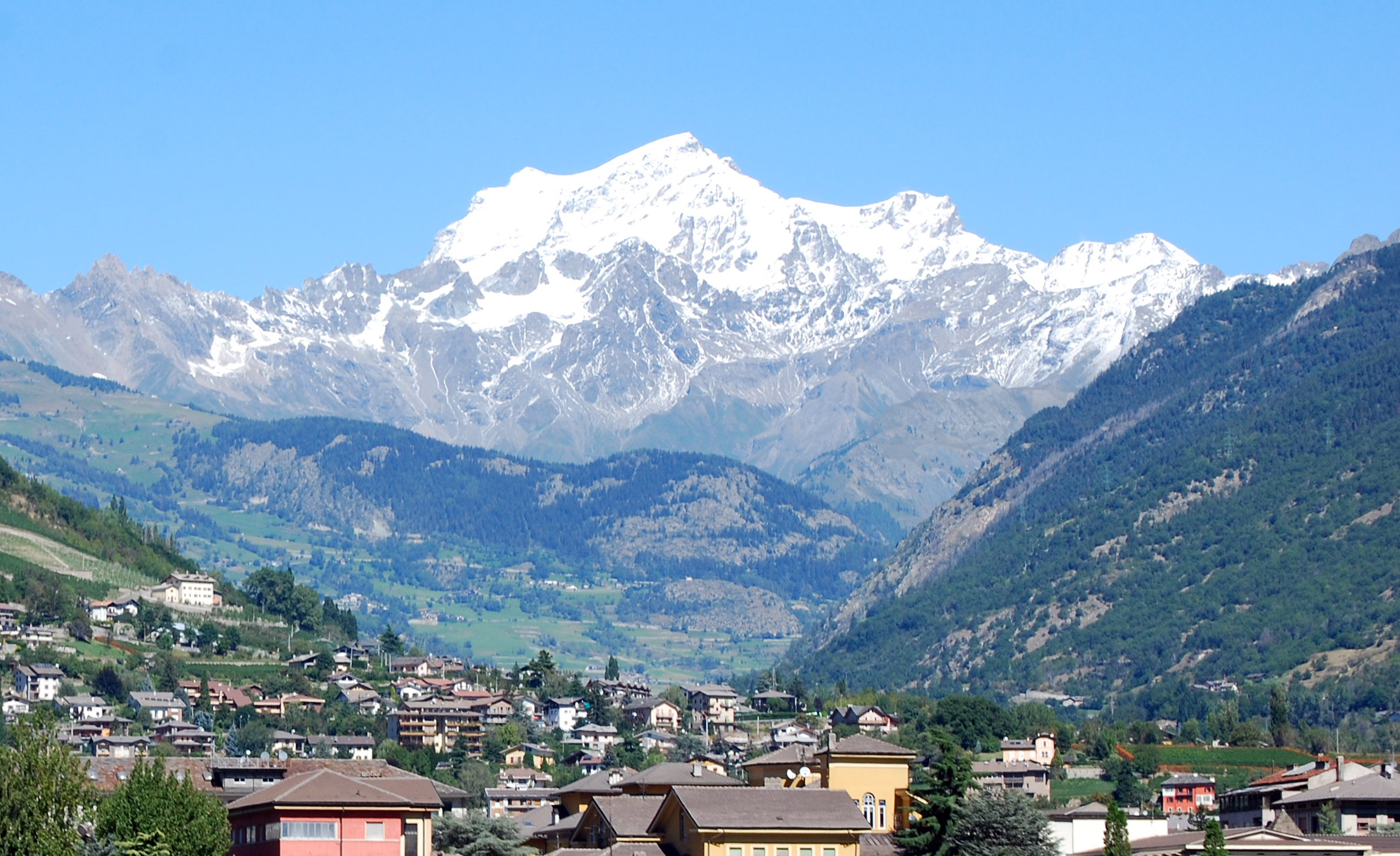
View from the south, upon the Valpelline Valley and Aosta

== Climbing huts ==
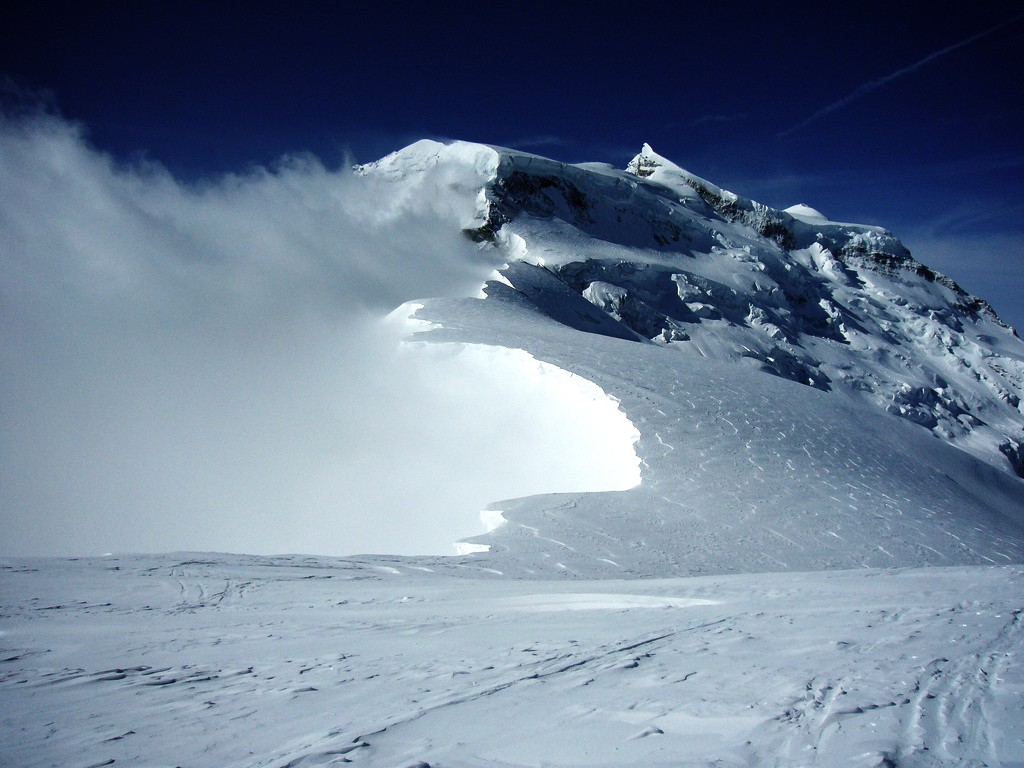
Approaching the summit from the north-eastern ridge

- Panossière Hut (2,641 m), north side
- Valsorey Hut (3,030 m), south-west side
- Bivouac Biaggio Musso (3,658 m), south side

== See also ==
- List of 4000 metre peaks of the Alps
