= Drance =

River in Switzerland

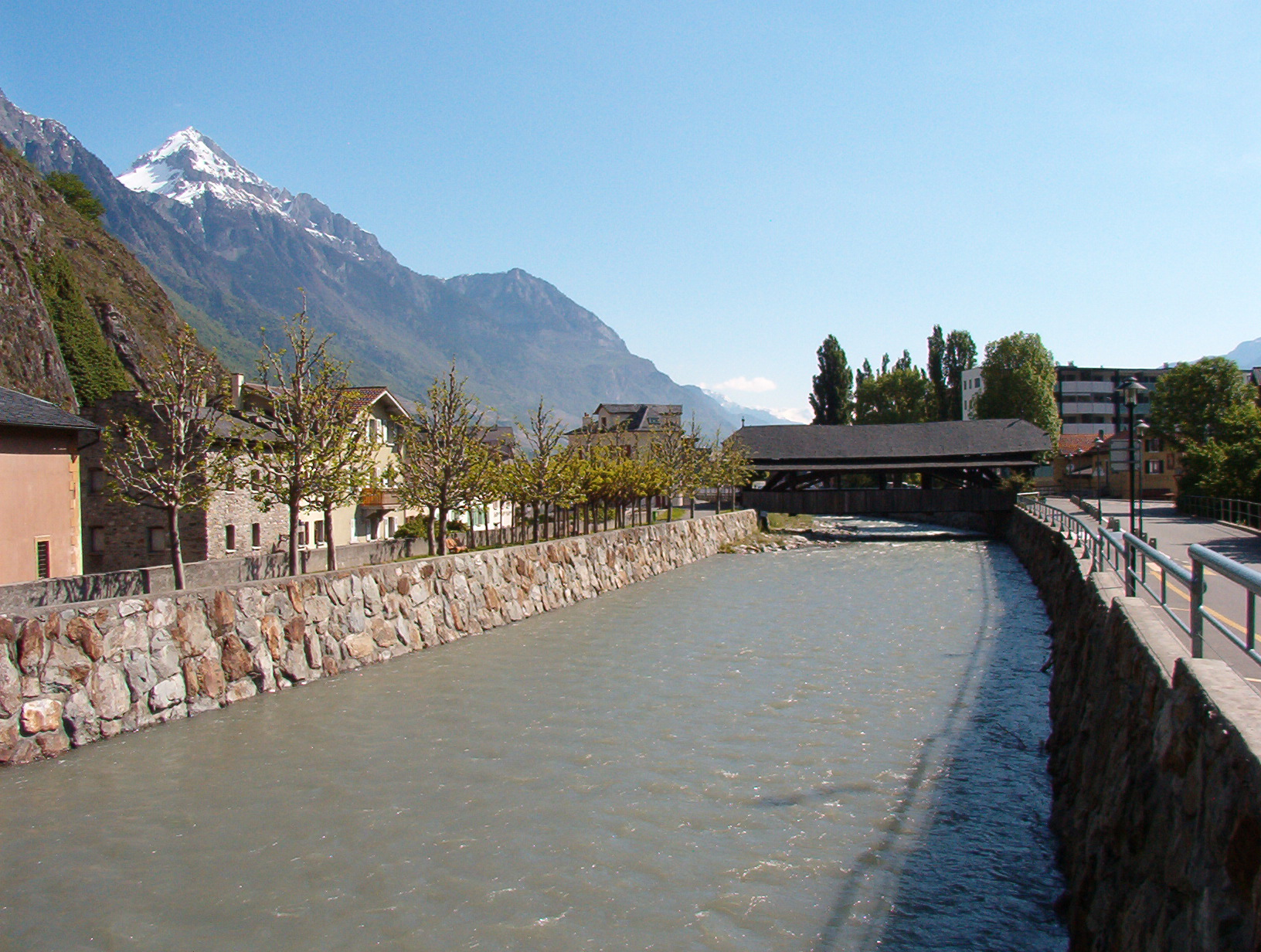
- The Drance at Martigny
- Native name: La Drance (French); Dranse (French)

Location
- Country: Switzerland
- Canton: Valais
- Settlements: Martigny, Bovernier, Sembrancher

Physical characteristics
- Source: Confluence of the Dranse d'Entremont and Dranse de Bagnes
  - location: Sembrancher, Valais
  - coordinates: 46°04′41″N 7°9′34″E
  - elevation: 4,308.0 m (14,133.9 ft)
- Mouth
  - location: Rhône at Martigny, Valais
  - coordinates: 46°07′31″N 7°3′57″E
  - elevation: 454 m (1,490 ft)
- Length: 14.5 km (9.0 mi)/43 km (27 mi) (Dranse de Bagnes)
- Basin size: 676 km^{2} (261 sq mi)
- Discharge
  - location: Martigny, Pont de Rossettan
  - average: 53.5 m^{3}/s (1,890 cu ft/s)
  - minimum: 2.08 m^{3}/s (73 cu ft/s) (NM7Q 1907–2017)
  - maximum: 177 m^{3}/s (6,300 cu ft/s)

Basin features
- Progression: Rhône→ Mediterranean Sea

The Drance (French: La Drance/Dranse, French pronunciation: [dʁɑ̃s]) is a river in Valais, Switzerland with a length of 14.5 kilometers (9.0 mi) to the confluence with the Rhône, a maximum length of 43 kilometers (27 mi). It has a drainage basin of 676 square kilometers (261 sq mi). The river is formed from the confluence of the Dranse d'Entremont and the Dranse de Bagnes at the village of Sembrancher. Further upriver the Dranse d'Entremont splits into the Dranse d'Entremont and the Dranse de Ferret.

== History ==
In 57/56 BC Julius Caesar sent Servius Galba with the Twelfth Legion and some cavalry to open the Great St Bernard Pass. The legion fought the Veragri at the village of Octodurus along the Drance river and drove them across the river before establishing a camp near the river. The Seduni and Veragri attacked the legion camp a few days later in the Battle of Octodurus. In 1349 a wooden toll bridge and dam are mentioned near La Bâtiaz village (now part of Martigny). In 1595 the river flooded and destroyed a chapel in La Bâtiaz and damage in Bagnes. In 1818 a glacial dam gave way below Giétro Glacier releasing 18 million cubic metres (640×10^{6} ft^{3}) of water into the river, killing 44 people and destroying many structures along the river. The last covered bridge in use in Valais today was built in 1829 to replace a bridge over the Drance which was destroyed in the 1818 flood.

On 26 July 2006 the Drance flooded destroying a 400 m (1,300 ft) section of railway track and derailing a St. Bernard Express train. All 34 passengers and the conductor of the train were uninjured. The floods also forced several thousand to evacuate in Martigny and other villages along the river.

== Geography ==
The Drance river is an alpine river mostly fed by glacial runoff. High in the Alps it is fed by numerous small streams that run down the surrounding mountains. The river flows into the Rhone river near the village of Martigny. About 14.5 kilometers (9.0 mi) upriver at Sembrancher, the river splits into the Dranse d'Entremont and the Dranse de Bagnes. Continuing upstream past Sembrancher the Dranse d'Entremont rises to the south. At Orsières it splits into the Dranse d'Entremont and the Dranse de Ferret. The Dranse d'Entremont passes through Lac des Toules before reaching its source near the Great St Bernard Pass. The Dranse de Ferret continues south until it reaches the Lacs de Fenêtre on the western slope of the Pointe de Drône. The Dranse de Bagnes rises to the east and then south east, passing through Lac de Mauvoisin, before reaching its source at the Brenay Glacier.

Location of the Drance in Valais

== Gallery ==
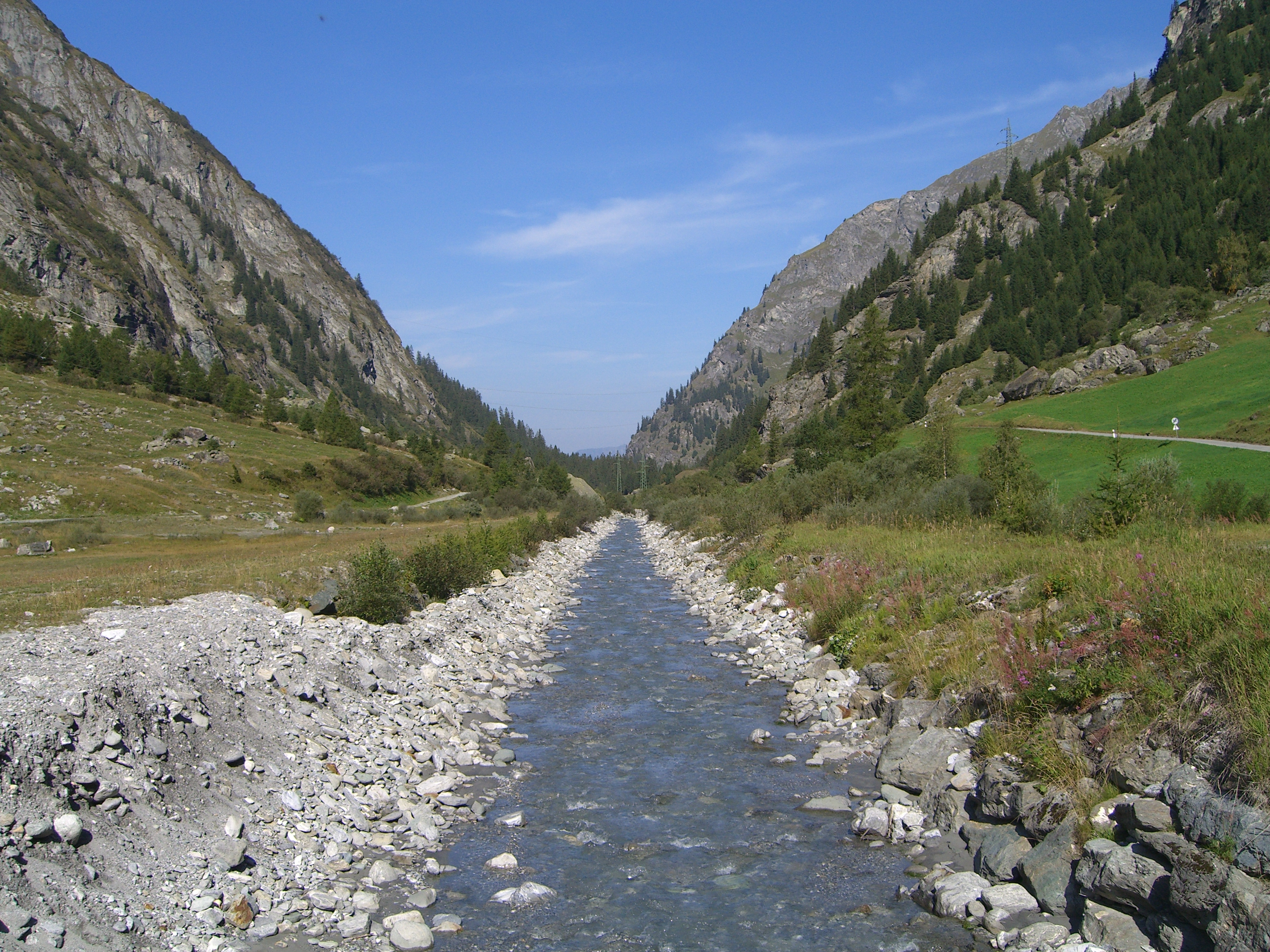
Dranse de Bagnes

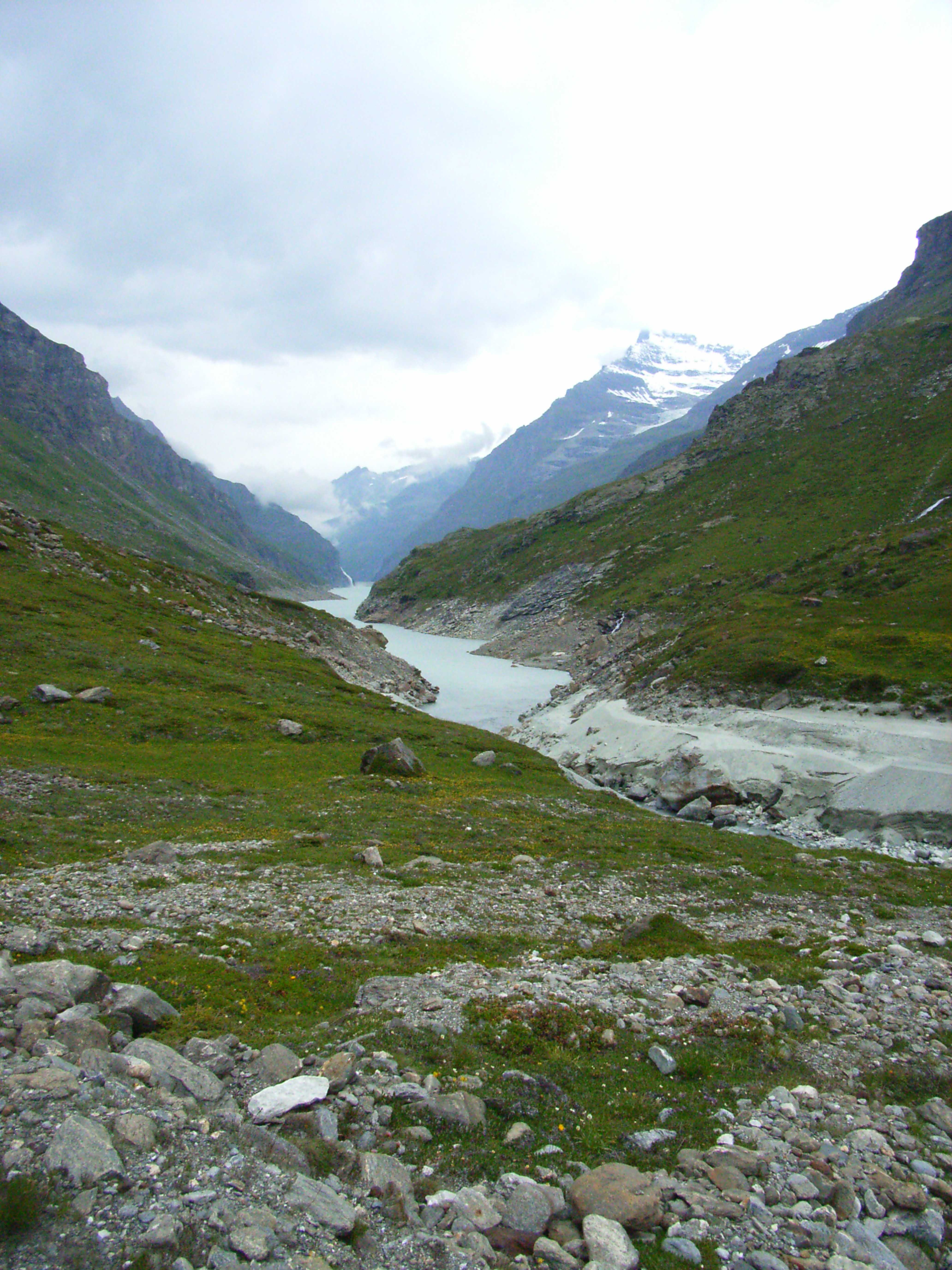
The Dranse de Bagnes at Lac de Mauvoisin with fluvial sediment build-up

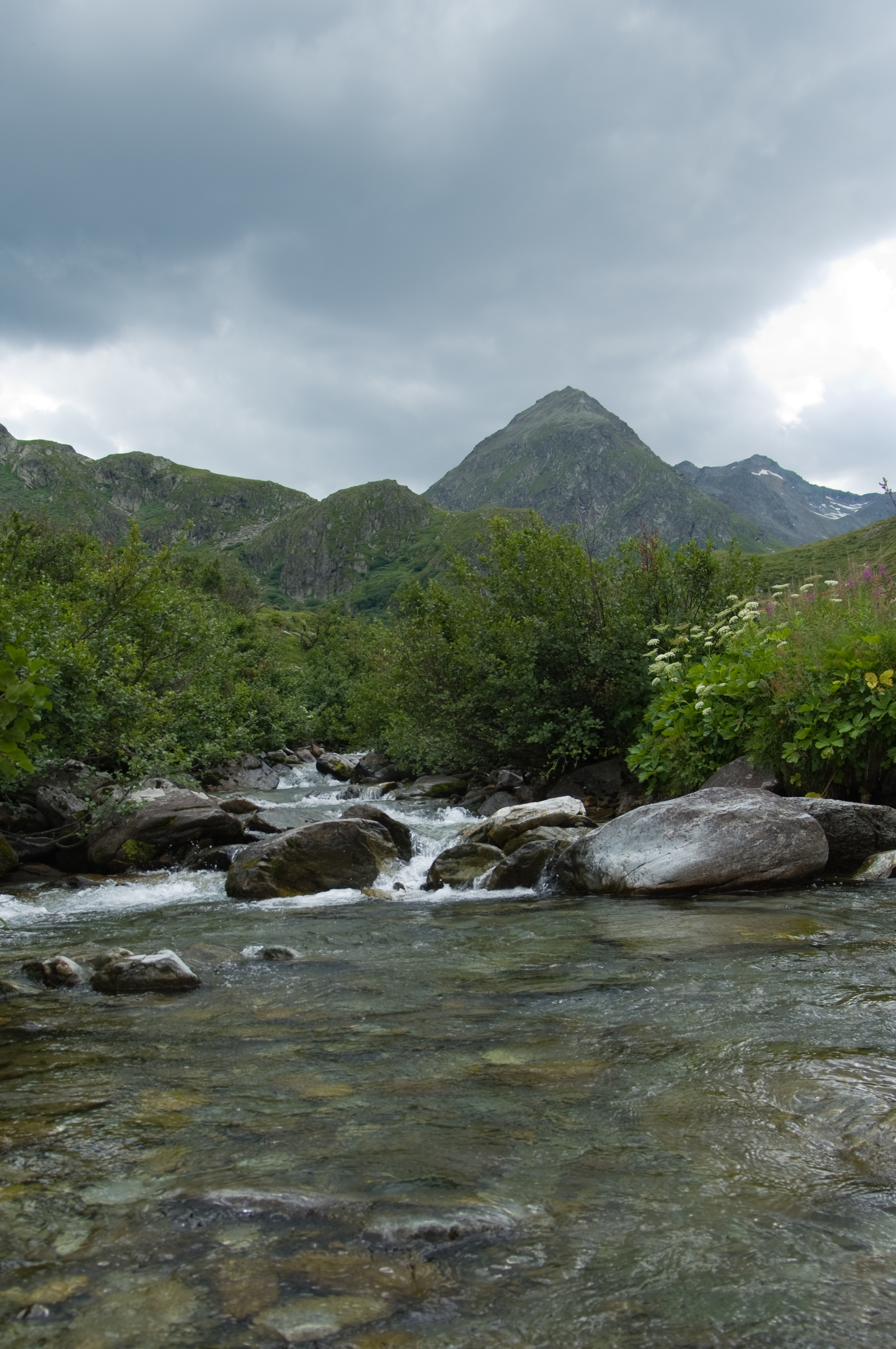
Dranse d'Entremont

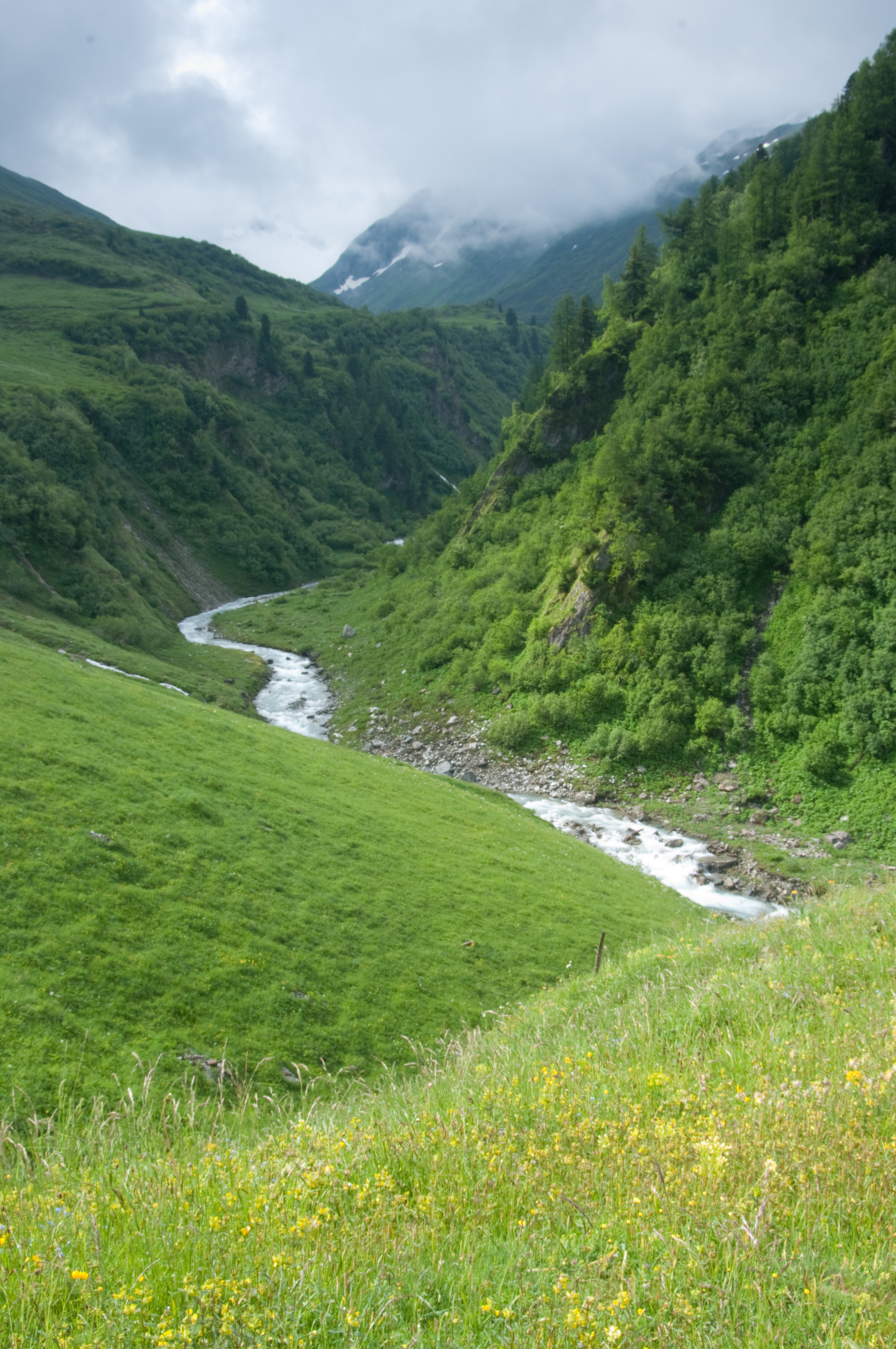
Dranse de Ferret
