= Battle of Octodurus =

Battle in the winter of 57–56 BCE

Coordinates: 46°6′N 7°4′E

- Part of the Gallic Wars
Date	57–56 BC
Location	Octodurus, Vallis Poenina (Valais), Gaul
Result	Roman victory

Belligerents
Roman Republic	Seduni, Veragri

Commanders and leaders
Servius Sulpicius Galba	[data missing]

Strength
About 5,000 men (1 legion)	30,000 (doubtful)

Casualties and losses
Unknown	c. 10,000 killed or wounded (doubtful)

The battle of Octodurus took place in the winter of 57–56 BC in the Gallic town of Octodurus in what is now Martigny, Valais, Switzerland. The battle resulted from a Roman attempt to open the Great St. Bernard Pass over the Alps. It was a Roman victory, but the ferocity of the fighting ended with the Roman legion moving back out of the Alps.

== Background ==
When Caesar was in Gaul (57–56 BC) he sent Servius Galba with the Twelfth Legion and some cavalry to Gallia Transalpina, into the country of the Nantuates, Veragri, and Seduni. He sent this force to protect the Poeninus Pass over the Alps. Roman merchants could travel over the pass, but were sometimes attacked and were forced to pay tolls to the mountain tribes.

Galba, after taking many strong places, and receiving the submission of the people, sent two cohorts into the country of the Nantuates, and wintered with the remaining cohorts in a town of the Veragri named Octodurus, which was in a narrow valley, surrounded by mountains and divided by the Dranse river. Galba gave one part of the town to the Galli (Gauls) to winter in, and assigned the other to his troops. He fortified the Roman portion of the town with a ditch and rampart and prepared for winter. However, a few days after they moved into camp, a Gallic army attacked the fortifications. Caesar gives a number of reasons for this attack, among them a belief that the Romans would not limit themselves to keeping the pass open, anger that a number of their children had been taken as hostages, and a belief that the single under-strength Roman legion was vulnerable to attack.

== Battle ==
Several days after going into winter quarters the Romans woke to find the Gallic half of the town deserted and the slopes above the town covered with a large force of Seduni and Veragri. The Roman fortifications needed to be completed and he had only limited supplies. The Romans defended themselves from the fortifications for about six hours, at which time, fearing that they would not be able to keep the enemy out, they sortied. The Roman attack succeeded, and Caesar stated that about one-third of the 30,000 tribesmen were killed. Smith mentions that due to the narrowness of the valley, the Gallic army might have been much smaller than Caesar's records and that the casualty figures might also have been inflated.

== Aftermath ==
Despite the Roman decisive victory, Galba didn’t feel strong enough to remain at Octodurus. He was running short of supplies and worried about foraging in the Alps during winter. He may have also feared raids by the scattered fragments of the Gallic army, which had retreated into the mountains. After burning the village, Galba marched out of the Alps and spent the rest of the winter in the lands of the Allobroges.
