= Martigny =

Place in Valais, Switzerland

- Municipality
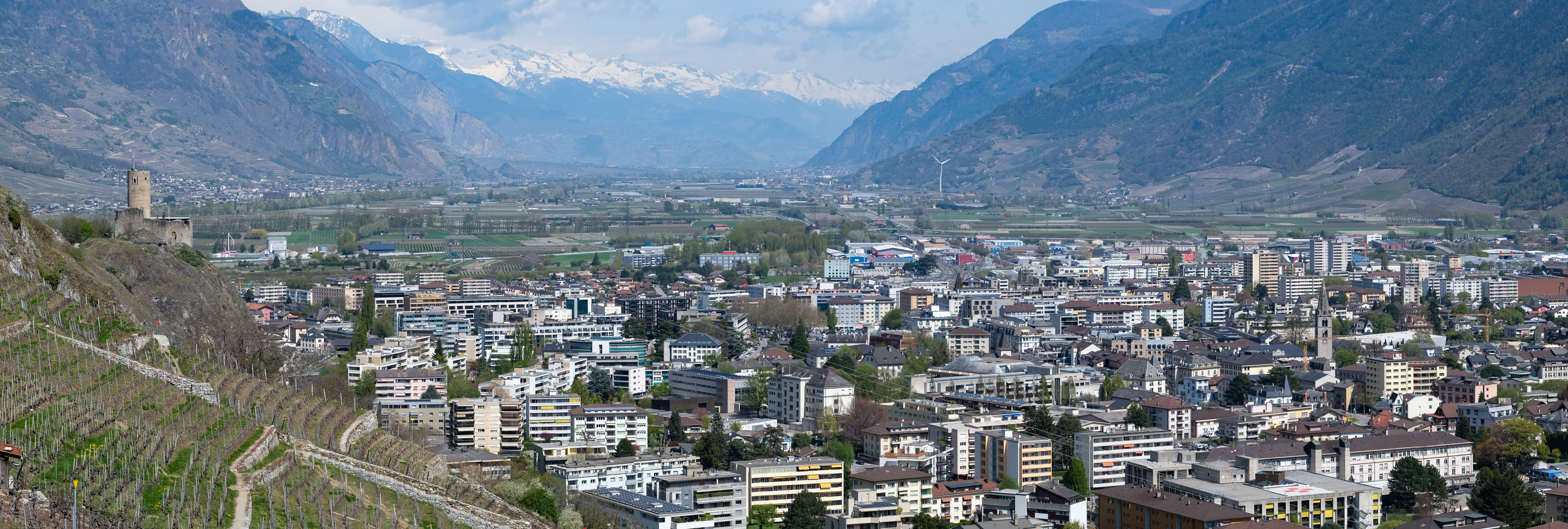

- Flag Coat of arms
- Location of Martigny
- Location within Switzerland Location within Canton of Valais
- Coordinates: 46°6′N 7°4′E
- Country: Switzerland
- Canton: Valais
- District: Martigny

Government
  - Executive: Conseil municipal with 9 members
  - Mayor: Président du conseil municipal (list); Anne-Laure Couchepin Vouilloz (as of June 2023)
  - Parliament: Conseil communal

Area
  - Total: 24.97 km^{2} (9.64 sq mi)
- Elevation: 471 m (1,545 ft)

Population (2013)
  - Total: 17,215
  - Density: 689.4/km^{2} (1,786/sq mi)
- Demonym: Les Martignerains
- Time zone: UTC+01:00 (CET)
  - Summer (DST): UTC+02:00 (CEST)
- Postal code: 1920
- SFOS number: 6136
- ISO 3166 code: CH-VS
- Localities: Chemin-Dessous, La Bâtiaz, La Verrerie, Le Guercet, Martigny-Bourg, Martigny-Ville
- Surrounded by: Bovernier, Dorénaz, Fully, Martigny-Combe, Salvan, Vernayaz, Vollèges
- Twin towns: Vaison-la-Romaine (France), Sursee (Switzerland)
- Website: www.martigny.ch

Martigny (French pronunciation: [maʁtiɲi]; German: Martinach, pronounced [ˈmaʁtiːnaːx]; Latin: Octodurum) is a municipality and the capital town of the district of Martigny, canton of Valais, Switzerland. It lies at an elevation of 471 meters (1,545 ft), and its population is approximately 20,000 inhabitants (Martignerains or "Octoduriens"). It is a junction of roads joining Italy, France and Switzerland. One road links it over the Great St. Bernard Pass to Aosta (Italy), and the other over the col de la Forclaz to Chamonix (France). In winter, Martigny is known for its numerous nearby Alp ski resorts such as Verbier.

== Geography ==
Martigny lies at an elevation of 471 meters (1,545 ft), about 33 kilometers (21 mi) south-southeast of Montreux. It is on the left foothills of the steep hillsides of the Rhone Valley, at the foot of the Swiss Alps, and is located at the point where the southwestern-flowing Rhone turns ninety degrees northward and heads toward Lake Geneva. The river La Drance flows from the southern Valais Alps (Wallis) through Martigny and joins the Rhone from the left just after Rhone's distinctive, almost rectangular change in direction.

Martigny has an area, (as of the 2004/09 survey), of 32.6 km^{2} (12.59 sq mi). Of this area, 31.5% is used for agricultural purposes, while 39.8% is forested. Of the rest of the land, 23.3% is settled (buildings or roads) and 5.3% is unproductive land.

In 1964 the current municipality was created with the merger of Martigny-Ville and Martigny-Bourg.

On 1 January 2021 the former municipality of Charrat merged into the municipality of Martigny.

Panoramic of Martigny

== History ==
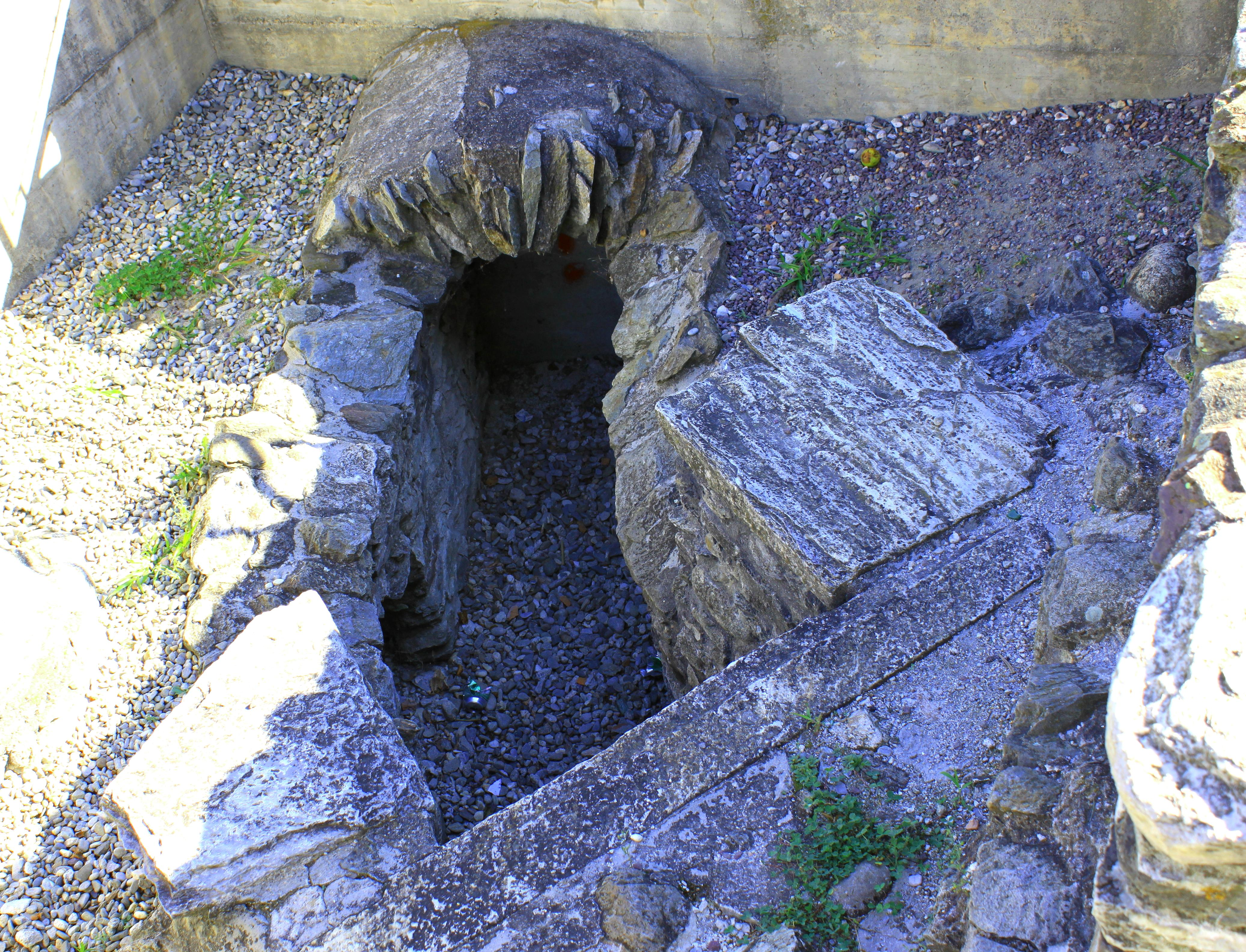
Remains of a Roman water supply in Martigny

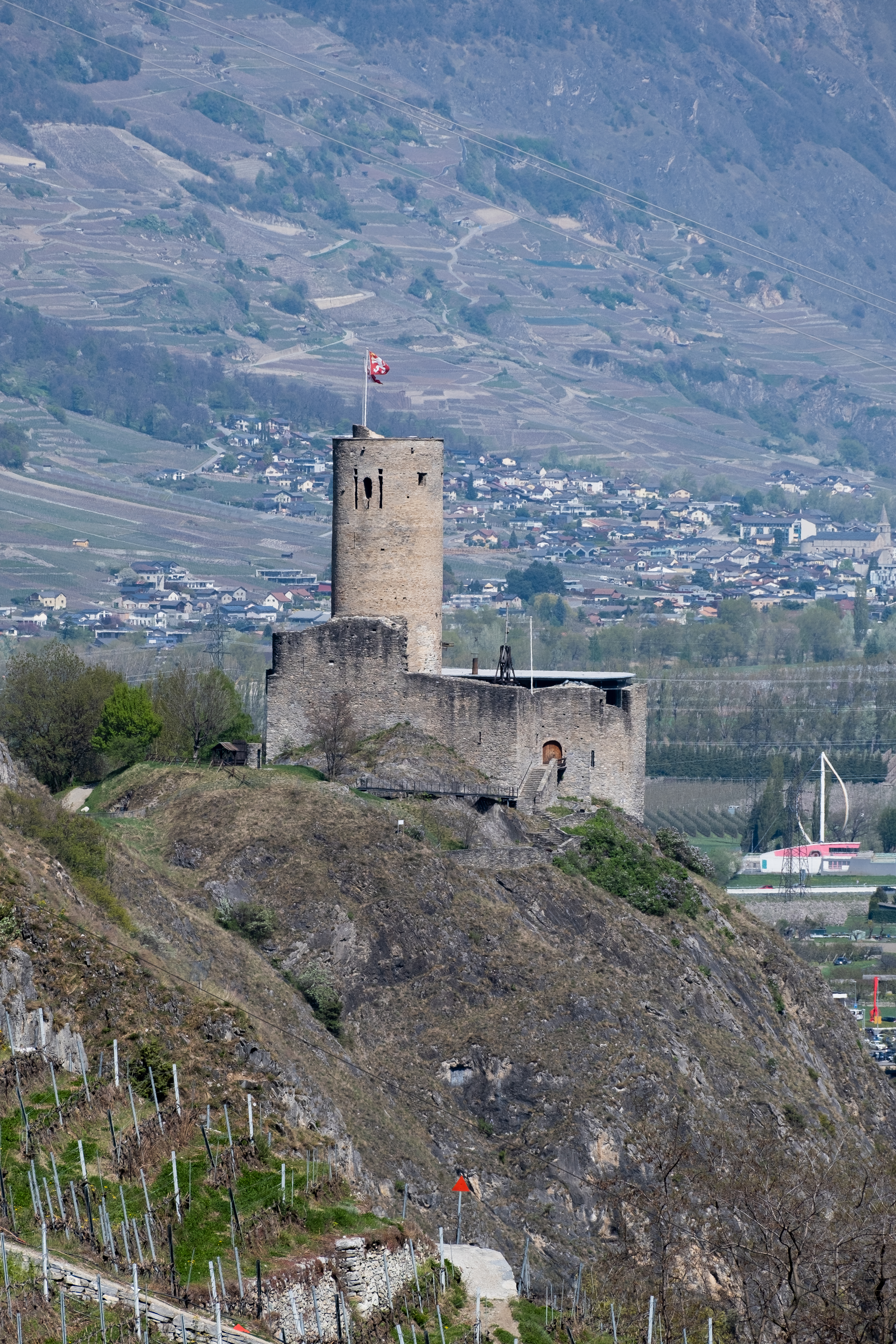
Château de la Bâtiaz

The Gaulish name of the settlement in the 1st century BC was either Octodurus or Octodurum (whence Martigny is sometimes also called Octodure in French), an oppidum or vicus of the Veragri. Octodurus was conquered by the Roman Republic in 57 BC, and occupied by Servius Galba with the twelfth legion and some cavalry in order to protect the strategically important pass of Poeninus (now known as the Great St. Bernard), by which road the mercatores had used to travel at great risk as well as paying great tolls. (B. G. iii. 1.) Galba, after capturing many local strongholds and receiving the submission of the people, sent troops into the country of the Nantuates, and with his remaining army determined to winter in Octodurus. Galba gave one part of the town to the Gauls to winter in, and assigned the other to his troops. He fortified himself with a ditch and rampart, and thought he was safe. He was, however, suddenly attacked by the Gauls before his defences were complete or all his supplies were brought into the camp, resulting in the Battle of Octodurus, and a very indecisive Roman victory; the Romans estimated the Gaulish force at more than 30,000, and Caesar says that more than a third part were destroyed; nevertheless Galba, "declining to try fortune too often" (B. G. iii. 6), burned the hamlet and retreated to the Province the next day.

Octodurus was later on joined to the Roman Empire, as part of the Alpes Poeninae province. Pliny (iii. c. 20) says that the Octodurenses received the Latinitas (Latio donati). Octodurus declined over the following decades, and between AD 41 and 47 (during the reign of Claudius), a new Roman colony named Forum Claudii Augusti, later renamed 'to Forum Claudii Vallensium, was established nearby to take the role of capital of the Vallis Poenina province. The town appears in the Antonine Itinerary and in the Tabula Peutingeriana. In the Notit. Prov., the place is called Civitas Vallensium Octodurus. At a later period it was called Forum Claudii Vallensium Octodurensium, as an inscription shows.

An episcopal see was established here in the 4th century (moved in the 6th century to Sion), making the Roman Catholic Diocese of Sion the oldest bishopric in what is now Switzerland. The first historically attested bishop of Octodurus was Theodulus (died in 391), who was present at the Council of Aquileia in 381. A restored Roman amphitheatre, temples, citizen living quarters, and thermal baths can be seen in Martigny today. One authority speaks of the remains of a Roman aqueduct at Martigny. Many coins, and other memorials of the Roman time, have been found about the place.

There are no records of the town during the early medieval period. In the Middle Ages, the town took Martin of Tours as its patron saint, and became known by the German name Martinach, recorded in Latinized form as Martiniacum in 1018. The church of Martigny, presumably at the site of the ancient cathedral, was consecrated to St. Mary in 1177, and to Notre-Dame-des-Champs in 1420. Martigny was placed under the protection of the House of Savoy in 1351, passing to Saint-Maurice in 1475, as the seven tithings (Sieben Zenden) in treaty with the bishop of Sion and the canton of Bern seized all of the Lower Valais. The town was granted a degree of autonomy, its citizens being allowed to elect their own local officials, known as the syndics (but no judges, as justice lay with the bishopric until 1798).

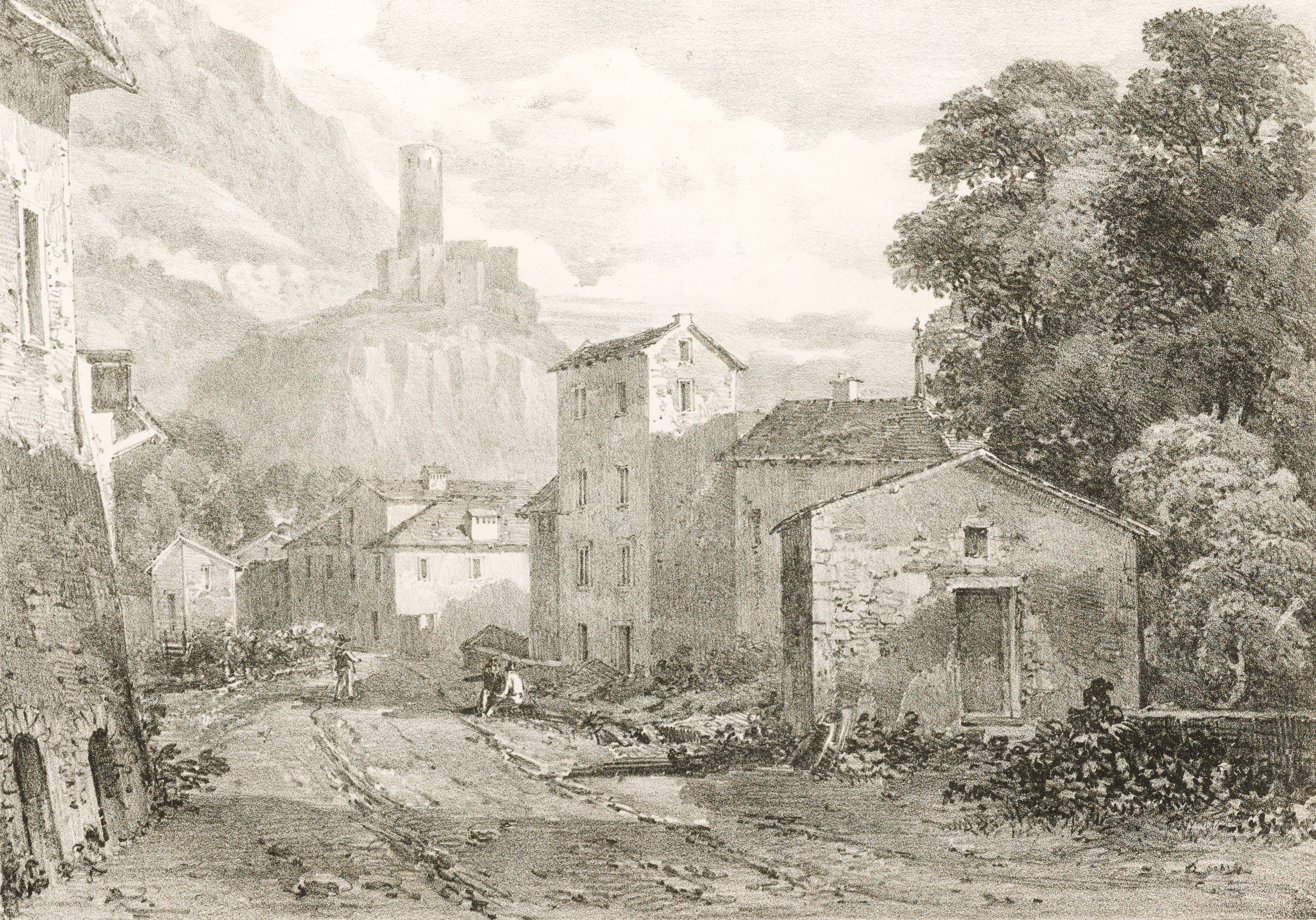
Martigny in 1820, lithograph illustrated by James Pattison Cockburn, printed by James Duffield Harding

The economy of Martigny was traditionally based on agriculture and viticulture. The town was often flooded by the Dranse, most severely in 1595 and in 1818. From 1798 to 1802, Martigny was part of the imperialist Napoleonic Republic of Valais, then in the Rhodanic Republic, which passed to France from 1810 to 1814. The Valais/Wallis passed to Switzerland in 1815. In the 1840s, Martigny was the stage of a confrontation between the liberal-radical "Young Switzerland" and the conservative "Old Switzerland" movements, culminating in the Battle at the Trient of 21 May 1844, taking place a few kilometres outside town. The town was split into independent municipalities of Martigny-Ville, Charrat, Martigny-Bourg and Martigny-Combe in the 1830s. La Bâtiaz and Trient were further split off Martigny-Combe in 1845 and 1899, respectively. This administrative fragmentation of the town was reversed in the 20th century, with a fusion of Martigny-Ville with La Bâtiaz in 1956 and with Martigny-Bourg in 1964.

Martigny was connected to the Simplon railway in 1878, with a separate railway station built in 1906. It was connected to the Swiss motorway system in 1981 with the completion of the Great-St-Bernard exit of the A9. Martigny had a population of 2,545 in 1850, of 3,550 in 1900 and of 5,915 in 1950.

== Coat of arms ==
The blazon of the municipal coat of arms is Gules, a lion rampant argent bearing a hammer or.

Historic aerial photograph by Werner Friedli from 1949

== Demographics ==
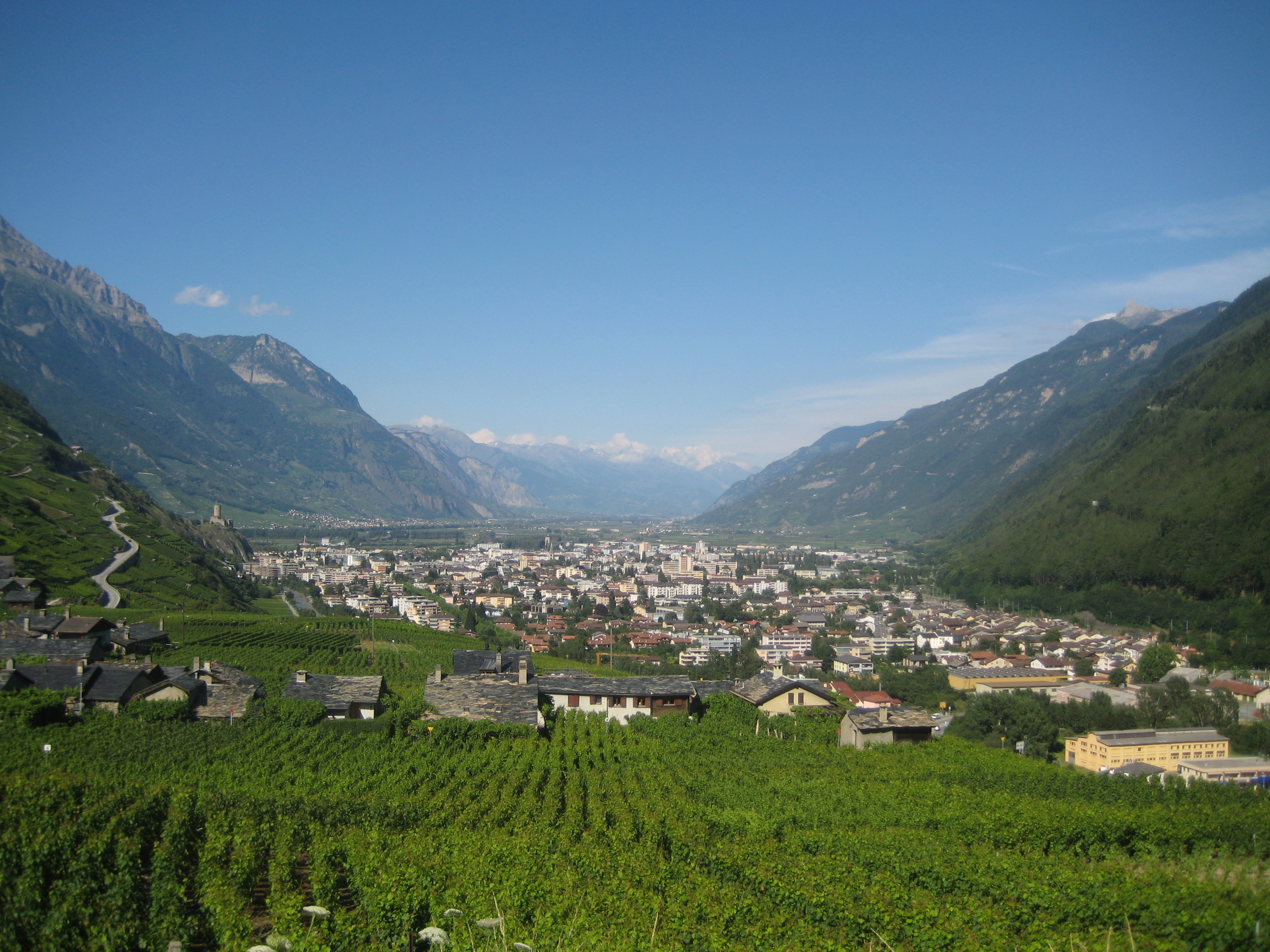
Martigny and surrounding fields

Martigny has a population (as of December 2020) of 18,291. As of 2008, 30.6% of the population are resident foreign nationals. During 2000–2010, the population has increased at a rate of 13.1%. It has changed at a rate of 6.7% due to migration and at a rate of 3.5% due to births and deaths.

Most of the population (as of 2000) speaks French (12,227 or 85.1%) as their first language, Portuguese is the second most common (602 or 4.2%) and Italian is the third (597 or 4.2%). There are 227 people who speak German and 9 people who speak Romansh.

As of 2008, the gender distribution of the population was 48.7% male and 51.3% female. The population was made up of 5,114 Swiss men (32.4% of the population) and 2,566 (16.3%) non-Swiss men. There were 5,830 Swiss women (37.0%) and 2,268 (14.4%) non-Swiss women. Of the population in the municipality 5,162 or about 35.9% were born in Martigny and lived there in 2000. There were 3,554 or 24.7% who were born in the same canton, while 1,439 or 10.0% were born somewhere else in Switzerland, and 3,694 or 25.7% were born outside of Switzerland.

The age distribution of the population (as of 2000) is children and teenagers (0–19 years old) make up 23.8% of the population, while adults (20–64 years old) make up 61.3% and seniors (over 64 years old) make up 14.8%.

As of 2000, there were 5,918 people who were single and never married in the municipality. There were 6,723 married individuals, 922 widows or widowers and 798 individuals who are divorced.

As of 2000, there were 6,001 private households in the municipality, and an average of 2.3 persons per household. There were 2,211 households that consist of only one person and 385 households with five or more people. In 2000, a total of 5,766 apartments (84.4% of the total) were permanently occupied, while 900 apartments (13.2%) were seasonally occupied and 168 apartments (2.5%) were empty. As of 2009, the construction rate of new housing units was 6.2 new units per 1000 residents. The vacancy rate for the municipality, in 2010, was 2.72%.

The historical population is given in the following chart:

== Heritage sites of national significance ==
The Centre valaisan du film, La Bâtiaz Castle, the three museums (Musée gallo-romain, Musée des voitures, Fondation Pierre Gianadda) and the Roman era city are listed as Swiss heritage site of national significance. The entire town of Martigny-Ville and the small town of Martigny-Bourg are part of the Inventory of Swiss Heritage Sites.

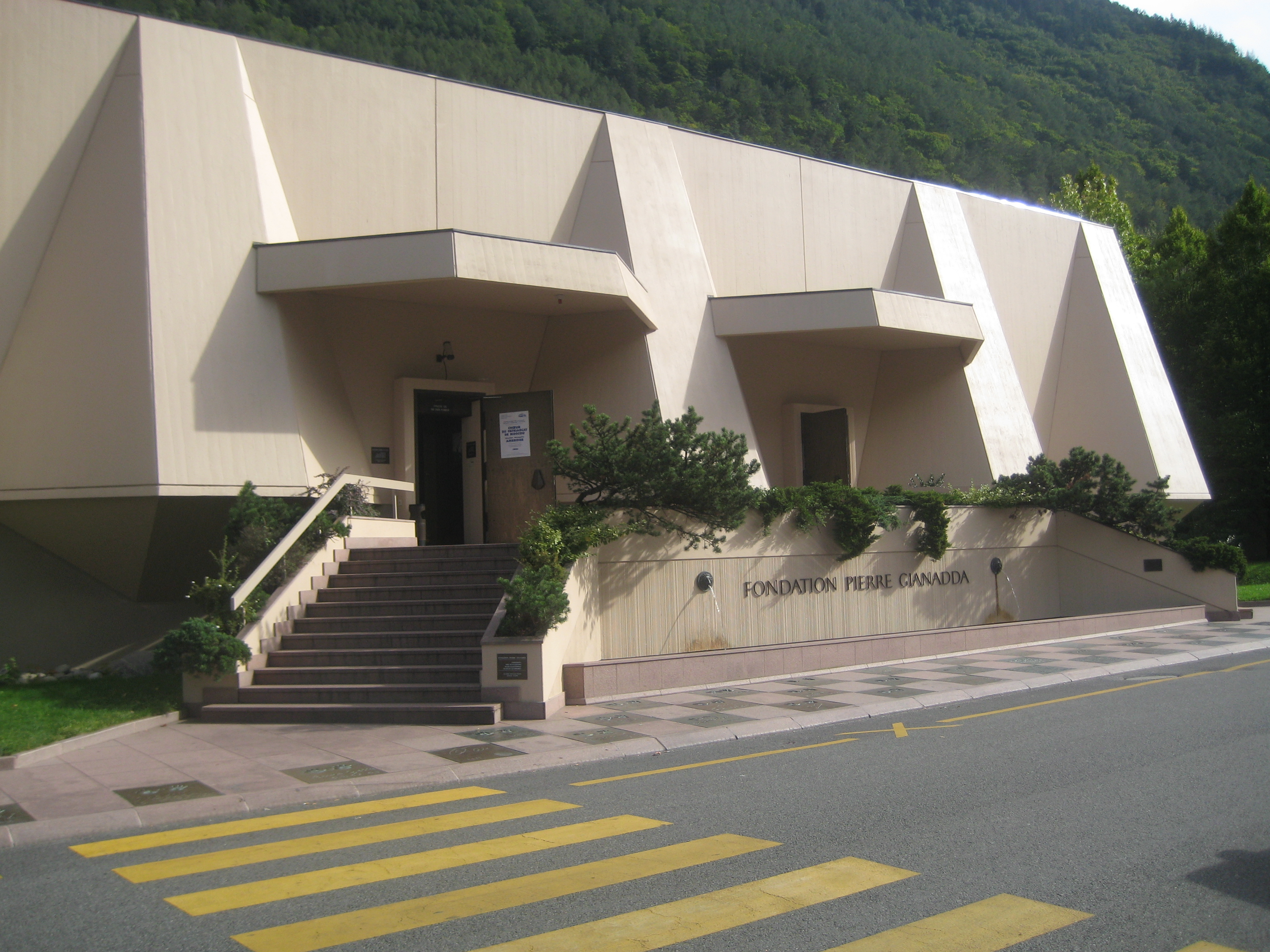
Fondation Gianadda

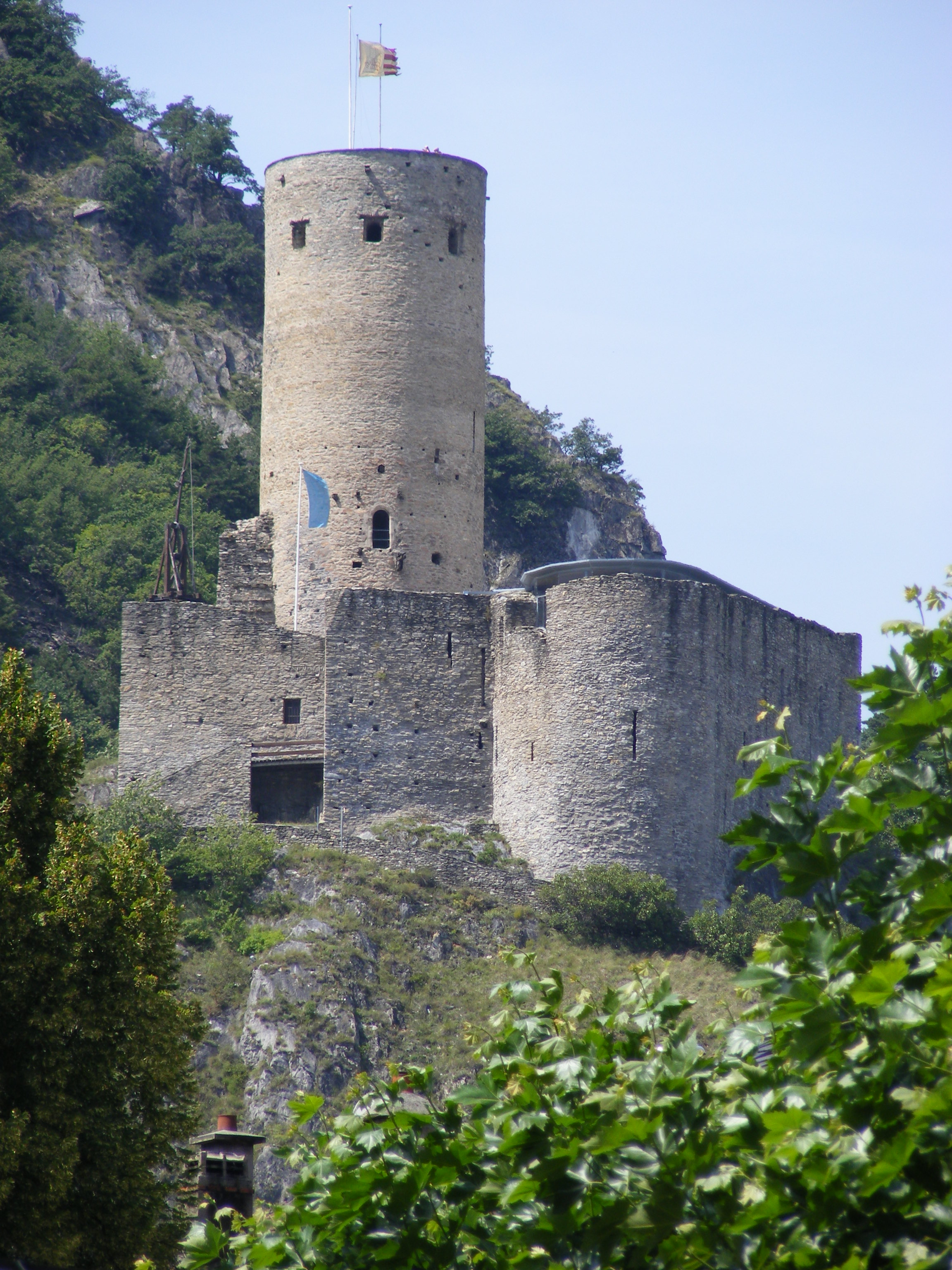
La Bâtiaz Castle

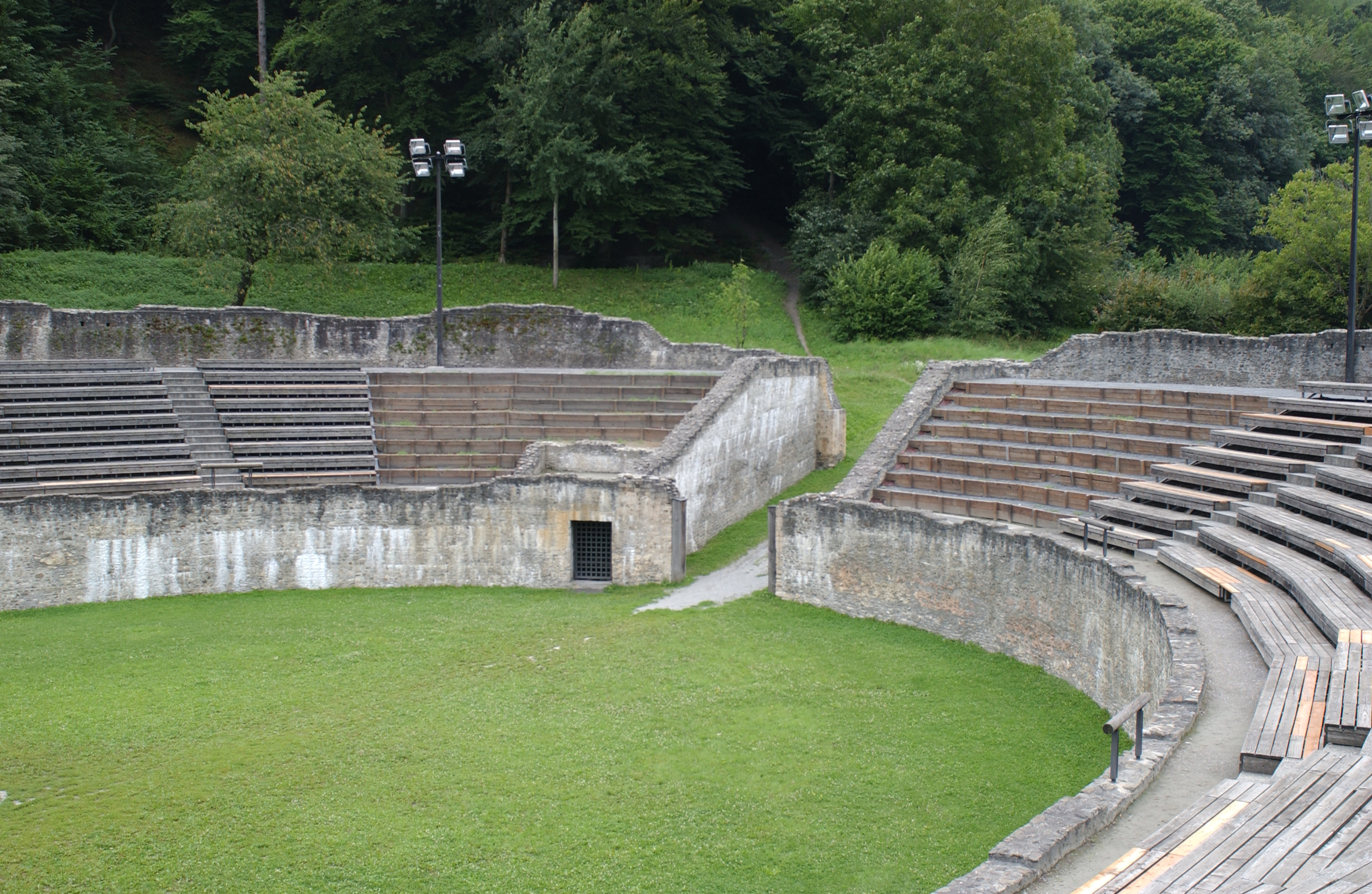
Restored Roman era amphitheater

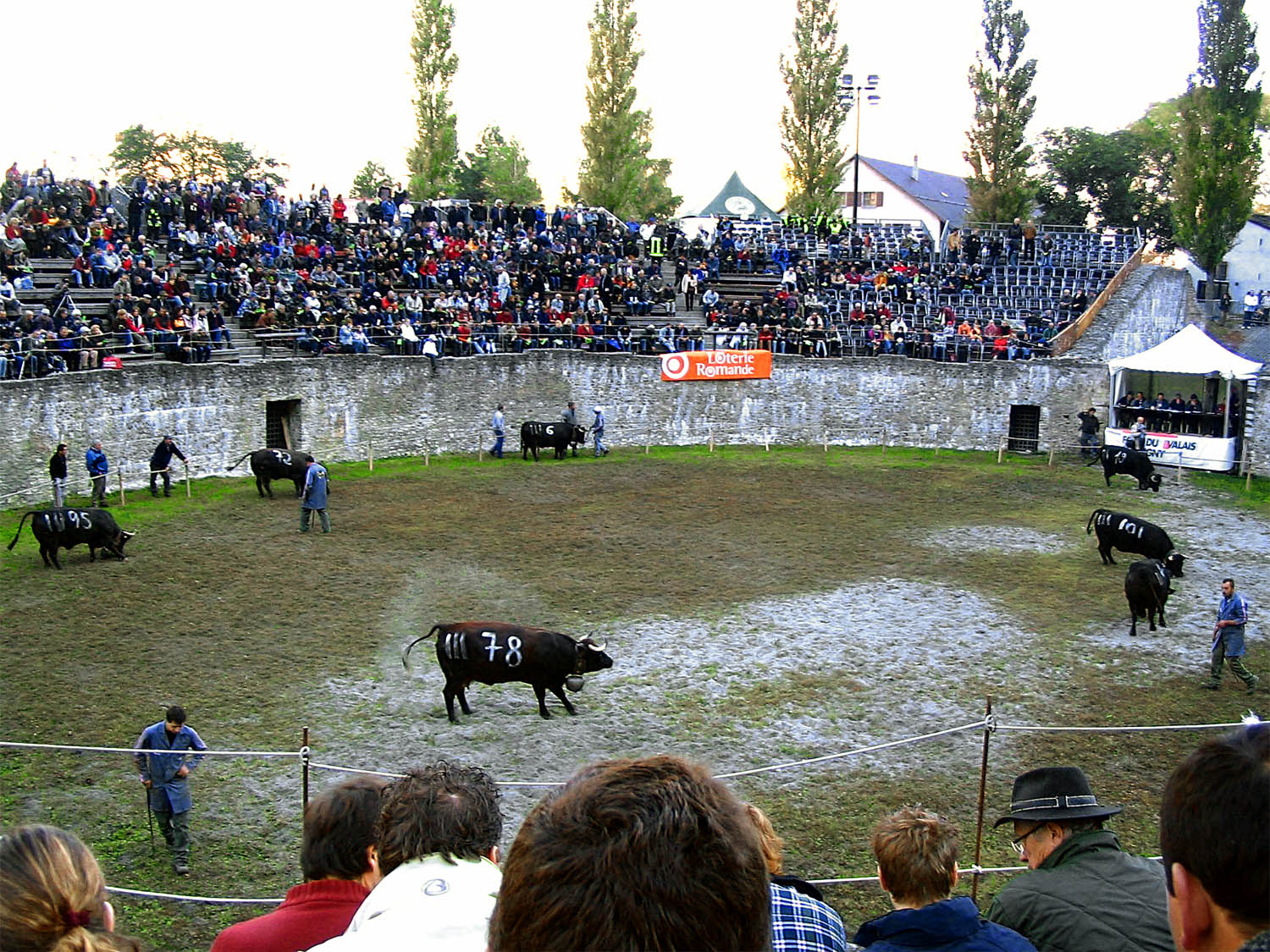
Cow fight in the amphitheater

=== Culture and the Gianadda Museum ===
The Romans left many archaeological remains in Martigny. The city is known for its amphitheater, which was restored in 1978. Cow fights are held in the amphitheater during early autumn for the "Comptoir". The city is notable for its Pierre Gianadda Foundation (Fondation Pierre Gianadda) museum. This is the most important cultural attraction in Martigny and, in addition to the Gallo-Roman Museum, houses a car museum. The building was constructed around the remains of a former Roman temple built on top of Roman ruins. The foundation hosts three painting exhibitions every year, with works by renowned masters.

== Politics ==
In the 2007 federal election the most popular party was the FDP which received 37% of the vote. The next three most popular parties were the CVP (26.23%), the SP (13.5%) and the SVP (13.39%). In the federal election, a total of 5,030 votes were cast, and the voter turnout was 56.9%.

In the 2009 Conseil d'État/Staatsrat election a total of 4,057 votes were cast, of which 335 or about 8.3% were invalid. The voter participation was 46.4%, which is much less than the cantonal average of 54.67%. In the 2007 Swiss Council of States election a total of 4,947 votes were cast, of which 412 or about 8.3% were invalid. The voter participation was 57.0%, which is similar to the cantonal average of 59.88%.

== Economy and agriculture ==
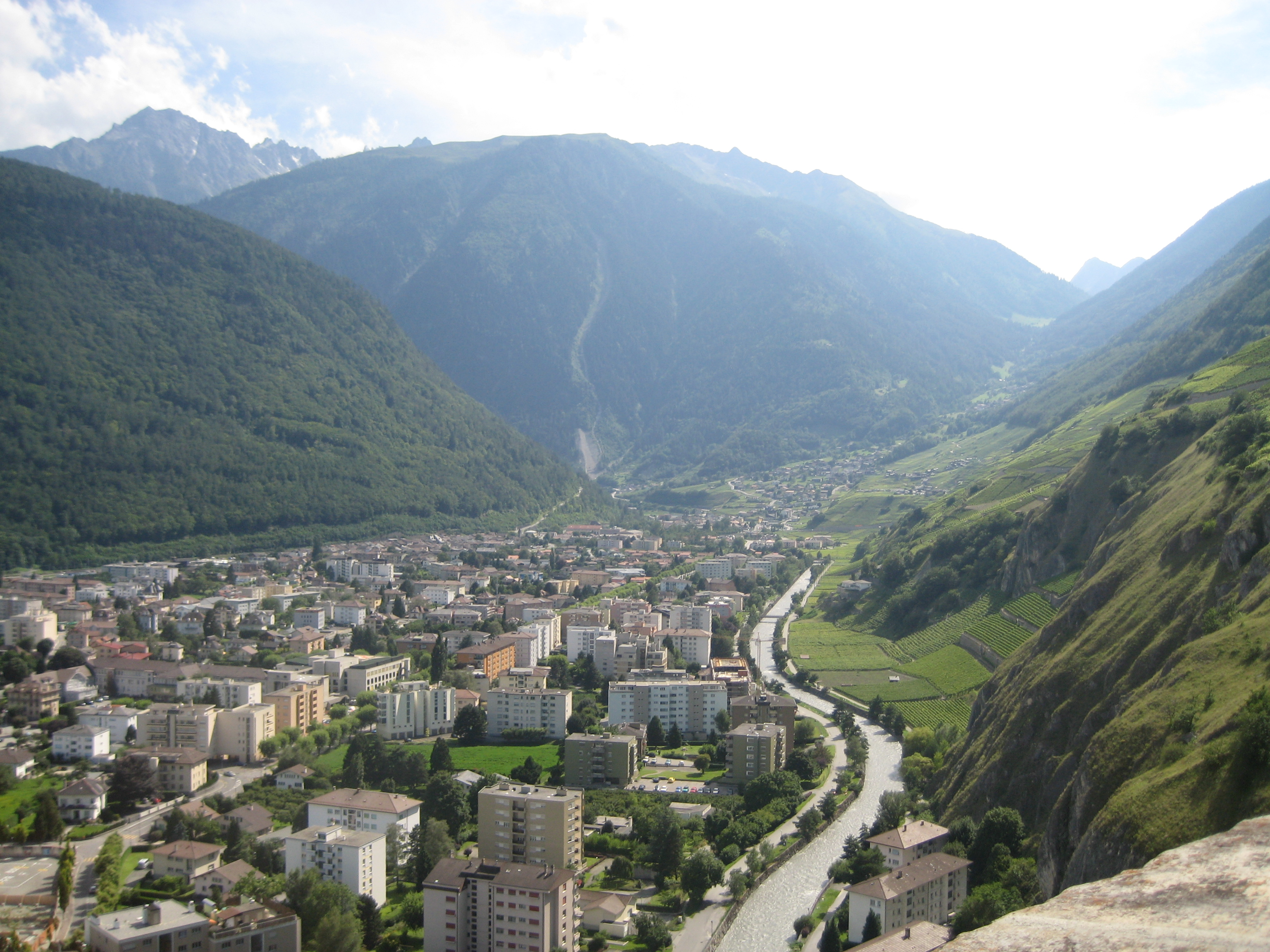
Martigny in the Rhône valley

Martigny is the headquarters of the Groupe Mutuel and is the headquarters of the watch brand 121TIME. The city is surrounded by vineyards and orchards and field crops. The relatively warm Valais (for Switzerland) sunshine is good for growing strawberries, apricots, asparagus, and the wine grapes which grow on the adjacent hills and steep slopes. The nearby Dranse River drains to the Rhône in the valley where Martigny lies.

As of 2010, Martigny had an unemployment rate of 6.5%. As of 2008, there were 251 people employed in the primary economic sector and about 74 businesses involved in this sector. 2,211 people were employed in the secondary sector and there were 188 businesses in this sector. 7,812 people were employed in the tertiary sector, with 871 businesses in this sector. There were 7,227 residents of the municipality who were employed in some capacity, of which females made up 44.2% of the workforce.

In 2008 the total number of full-time equivalent jobs was 8,663. The number of jobs in the primary sector was 145, of which 137 were in agriculture and 8 were in forestry or lumber production. The number of jobs in the secondary sector was 2,100 of which 897 or (42.7%) were in manufacturing, 2 or (0.1%) were in mining and 1,082 (51.5%) were in construction. The number of jobs in the tertiary sector was 6,418. In the tertiary sector; 1,491 or 23.2% were in wholesale or retail sales or the repair of motor vehicles, 582 or 9.1% were in the movement and storage of goods, 594 or 9.3% were in a hotel or restaurant, 103 or 1.6% were in the information industry, 740 or 11.5% were the insurance or financial industry, 827 or 12.9% were technical professionals or scientists, 286 or 4.5% were in education and 964 or 15.0% were in health care.

In 2000, there were 4,424 workers who commuted into the municipality and 2,362 workers who commuted away. The municipality is a net importer of workers, with about 1.9 workers entering the municipality for every one leaving. Of the working population, 10.4% used public transportation to get to work, and 58.8% used a private car.

== Religion ==
From the 2000 census, 11,089 or 77.2% were Roman Catholic, while 715 or 5.0% belonged to the Swiss Reformed Church. Of the rest of the population, there were 115 members of an Orthodox church (or about 0.80% of the population), there were 13 individuals (or about 0.09% of the population) who belonged to the Christian Catholic Church, and there were 309 individuals (or about 2.15% of the population) who belonged to another Christian church. There were 2 individuals (or about 0.01% of the population) who were Jewish, and 696 (or about 4.85% of the population) who were Muslim. There were 29 individuals who were Buddhist, 18 individuals who were Hindu and 13 individuals who belonged to another church. 769 (or about 5.35% of the population) belonged to no church, are agnostic or atheist, and 745 individuals (or about 5.19% of the population) did not answer the question.

== Sport ==
HCV Martigny currently plays in the second tier, Swiss League (SL). Their home arena is the 3,500-seat Forum d'Octodure.

FC Martigny-Sports is Martigny's amateur football team.

== Education ==
In Martigny about 4,520 or (31.5%) of the population have completed non-mandatory upper secondary education, and 1,487 or (10.4%) have completed additional higher education (either university or a Fachhochschule). Of the 1,487 who completed tertiary schooling, 53.2% were Swiss men, 29.3% were Swiss women, 11.0% were non-Swiss men and 6.5% were non-Swiss women.

As of 2000, there were 835 students in Martigny who came from another municipality, while 502 residents attended schools outside the municipality.

Martigny is home to the Médiathèque Valais - Martigny library. The library has (as of 2008) 57,756 books or other media, and loaned out 144,524 items in the same year. It was open a total of 280 days with average of 22 hours per week during that year.

== Transportation ==
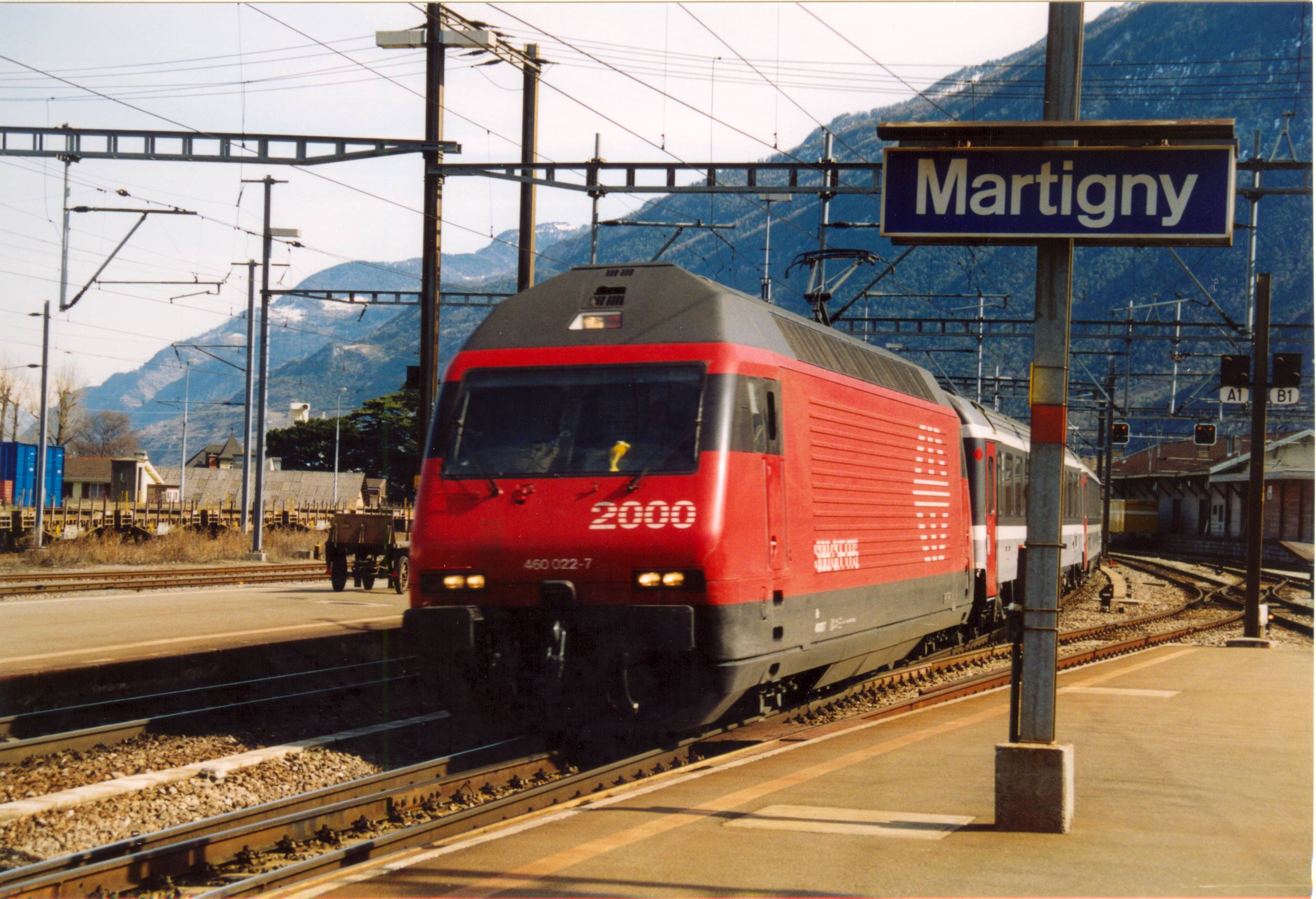
Martigny train station

Martigny is on the high-speed Simplon line of the Swiss Federal Railway, SBB, which connects Italy (Domodossola) and southern Switzerland to northeastern Switzerland and the cities of Lausanne and Geneva. It also is the origin of narrow gauge railroads and bus routes that climb into the nearby mountains on both sides of the Rhone valley in which Martigny lies. One railroad goes west to Chamonix, France, crossing the border at Le Chatelard. The other railroad goes southeast to Chable and Orsieres. The regional transportation agency known as TMR SA (Transports de Martigny et Regions) operates this service and the ski trains known as the Mount-Blanc Express (to Chamonix) and the St. Bernard Express (to Orsieres). See the transportation map provided by the TMR website in the External Links section below. Thanks to Martigny's transport connections the winter sports regions of the "4 Vallées", Portes-du-Soleil and Ovronnaz are easily reached.

It has been nearly one century since the two original railway companies Martigny-Orsières (MO) and Martigny-Châtelard (MC) began serving the valleys of Entremont and Trient. In 1990, the boards of directors of MO and MC decided to combine for common management, however each company would maintain an independent status. Two new trains were started: the Saint-Bernard Express for the MO, and the Mont Blanc Express for the MC. Later the Octodure-Voyages and Orsières-Octodure-Transports companies were taken over. TMRSA is an important employer in the region with some 180 permanent staff.

The French holiday resort of Chamonix is accessible from Martigny in one-and-a-half hours using the narrow-gauge tracks of the "Mont Blanc Express".

The nearest airports to the city are Geneva Airport, located 135 km (84 mi) to the west and Bern Airport, located 137 km (85 mi) to the north-east of Martigny.

== Notable people ==
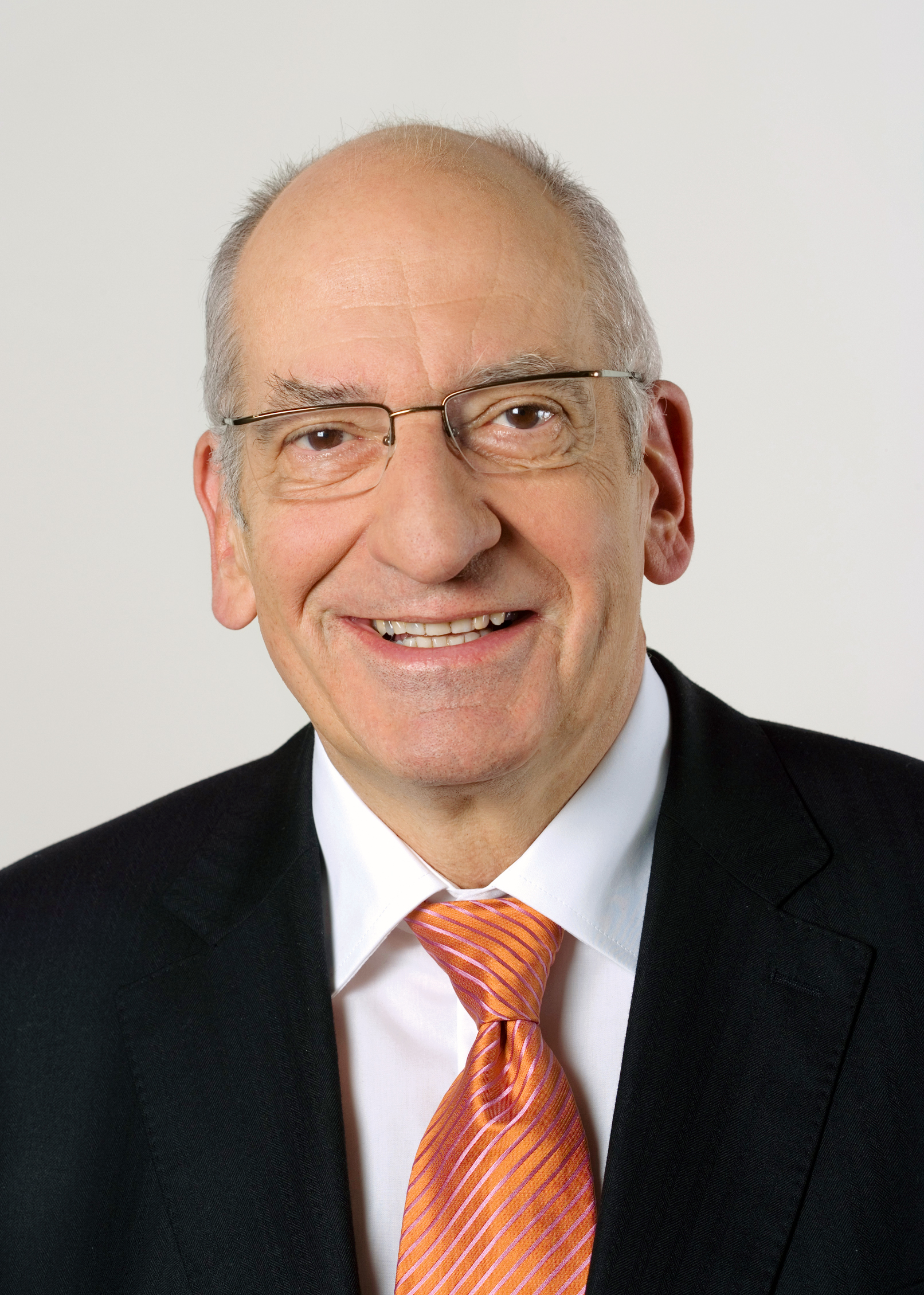
Pascal Couchepin, 2009

- Alfred Tissières (1917–2003), Swiss molecular biologist
- François Couchepin (born 1935), a Swiss lawyer and former politician
- Pascal Couchepin (born 1942), a politician, President of the Swiss Confederation in 2003 and 2008
- Nicolas Puech (born 1943), a French billionaire, heir and businessman; lives in Martigny
- Gérald Métroz (born 1962), a journalist, sports consultant, wheelchair sportsman and motivational speaker
- Pierre-Marie Taramarcaz (born 1968), a Swiss ski mountaineer
- Johann Lonfat (born 1973), a Swiss former footballer, over 350 club caps and 24 for Switzerland
- Latifa Echakhch (born 1974), a Moroccan-French visual artist, lives and works in Martigny
- Yannick Ecoeur (born 1981), a Swiss ski mountaineer and mountain runner
- Stéphane Lambiel (born 1985), figure skater, coach and two-times World champion
- Sébastien Reichenbach (born 1989), a Swiss cyclist
- Antoine Dorsaz (born 1989), a Swiss pair skater
- Justin Murisier (born 1992), a Swiss World Cup giant slalom alpine ski racer

== International relations ==
=== Twin towns — Sister cities ===
Martigny is twinned with:

| Aosta, Italy | Vaison-la-Romaine, France |
