= Uberi =

Ancient Celtic tribe

The Uberi were a Celtic tribe dwelling near the source of the Rhône river, in the modern-day Canton of Valais (Switzerland), during the Iron Age and the Roman period.

Along with the Nantuates, Veragri and Seduni, the Uberi were part of the Vallenses, a group of tribes living between Lake Geneva and the Pennine Alps.

== Name ==
They are mentioned as Uberi in Pliny the Elder's Naturalis Historia (1st c. AD).

== Geography ==
The Uberi dwelled near the source of the Rhône river, in the upper part of the modern Canton of Valais. The Barrington Atlas locates their territory north of the Seduni, west of the Lepontii, east of the Nantuates, and south of the Helvetii.

After the Roman conquered the region in 16–15 BC, their territory was initially administered in common with the province of Raetia et Vindelicia under a legatus, when they likely had their own civitas within the administrative region of Vallis Poenina. They later lost their autonomy following their integration into the Alpes Graiae et Poeninae by Claudius (41–54 AD), with the creation of a single civitas (civitas Vallensium) shared with the other Vallensian tribes.

== History ==
They are mentioned by Pliny the Elder as one of the Alpine tribes conquered by Rome in 16–15 BC, and whose name was engraved on the Tropaeum Alpium.

== Culture ==
The Uberi had close links with the nearby and larger Lepontii. According to Pliny, they were actually a subsection of the Lepontii. Archaeological evidence from the site of Gamsen-Waldmatte in Brig-Glis indicate that the Uberi were only partially Romanized.
