= Seduni =

Gallic tribe

The Seduni were a Gallic tribe dwelling in the upper Rhône valley, around present-day Sion, during the Iron Age and the Roman period.

Along with the Nantuates, Veragri and Uberi, they were part of the Vallenses, a group of tribes living between Lake Geneva and the Pennine Alps, in the modern Canton of Valais (Switzerland).

== Name ==
They are mentioned as Sedunos, Sedunorum and Sedunis by Caesar (mid-1st c. BC), and as Seduni by Livy (late 1st c. BC) and Pliny (1st c. AD).

The meaning of the ethnonym Seduni remains unclear. According to Alexander Falileyev, it may be based on the Celtic root *sedo-, meaning both 'tumulus (inhabited by supernatural beings)' and 'peace'. Pierre-Yves Lambert has also proposed to analyze the name as a haplology (loss of syllable) for *Se(go)-dunum ('the strong fortress').

The city of Sion, attested as Sedunum in Roman times, is named after the Gallic tribe.

== Geography ==
The Seduni dwelled in the upper Rhône valley, in the modern Canton of Valais. The Barrington Atlas locates their territory east of the Nantuates and Veragri, south of the Uberi, and west of the Lepontii.

After the Roman conquered the region in 16–15 BC, their territory was initially administered in common with the province of Raetia et Vindelicia under a legatus, when they had their own civitas within the administrative region of Vallis Poenina. They later lost their autonomy following their integration into the Alpes Graiae et Poeninae by Claudius (41–54 AD), with the creation of a single civitas (civitas Vallensium) shared with the other Vallensian tribes.

Their chief town was known as Sedunum (modern Sion, Switzerland). In 8–7 BC, the Sedunian civitas honoured emperor Augustus with an inscription. Even though Sedunum lost its political importance in the mid-1st century AD, when Forum Claudii Vallensium (Martigny) became the capital of the civitas Vallensium, the location remained a popular place of residence for notables: funerary stelae attest to the presence of duumviri (magistrates of the civitas), flamines (priests of the imperial cult), a Roman knight, a former consul, and, by the 4th century, praesidia (governors of the province).

== History ==
In 57–56 BC, the Seduni fought against the Roman forces of Caesar at the Battle of Octodurus (modern-day Martigny, Switzerland).

They are mentioned by Pliny the Elder as one of the Alpine tribes conquered by Rome in 16–15 BC, and whose name was engraved on the Tropaeum Alpium.

== Primary sources ==
- Caesar (1917). The Gallic War. Loeb Classical Library. Translated by Edwards, H. J. Harvard University Press. ISBN 978-0-674-99080-7.
- Livy (2019). History of Rome. Loeb Classical Library. Translated by Yardley, J. C. Harvard University Press. ISBN 978-0674992566.
- Pliny (1938). Natural History. Loeb Classical Library. Translated by Rackham, H. Harvard University Press. ISBN 9780674993648.

=== Bibliography ===
- Falileyev, Alexander (2010). Dictionary of Continental Celtic Place-names: A Celtic Companion to the Barrington Atlas of the Greek and Roman World. CMCS. ISBN 978-0955718236.
- Graßl, Herbert (2006a). "Seduni". Brill's New Pauly. doi:10.1163/1574-9347_bnp_e1106370.
- Graßl, Herbert (2006b). "Vallenses". Brill's New Pauly. doi:10.1163/1574-9347_bnp_e1228280.
- Lambert, Pierre-Yves (1994). La langue gauloise: description linguistique, commentaire d'inscriptions choisies. Errance. ISBN 978-2-87772-089-2.
- Talbert, Richard J. A. (2000). Barrington Atlas of the Greek and Roman World. Princeton University Press. ISBN 978-0691031699.
- Wiblé, François (2010). "Sédunes". Historisches Lexikon der Schweiz.
- Wiblé, François (2017). "Sion (commune). De la préhistoire au haut Moyen Age". Historisches Lexikon der Schweiz.
