= Veragri =

Gallic tribe

The Veragrī (Gaulish: *Ueragroi, 'super-warriors'; Greek: Οὐάραγροι) were a Gallic tribe dwelling around present-day Martigny, in the Pennine Alps, during the Iron Age and the Roman period.

Along with the Nantuates, Seduni and Uberi, they were part of the Vallenses, a group of tribes living between Lake Geneva and the Pennine Alps, in the modern Canton of Valais (Switzerland).

== Name ==
They are mentioned as Veragros by Caesar (mid-1st c. BC), uer agri by Livy (late 1st c. BC), Ou̓áragroi (Οὐάραγροι) by Strabo (early 1st c. AD), Varagri by Pliny (1st c. AD), Ouarágrous (Οὐαράγρους) by Cassius Dio (3rd c. AD), and as Veragros (var. beragros, ueragres) by Orosius (early 5th c. AD).

The ethnonym Veragrī is a Latinized form of Gaulish Ueragroi (sing. Ueragros). It has been translated as 'super-warriors'. It stems from the Celtic root *uer(o)- ('super'; cf. Old Irish for-, Old Welsh guar; from PIE *uper-) attached to the noun agros ('battle, carnage'; cf. Old Irish ár, Old Breton air; from PIE *h₂eǵro- 'hunt'). Christian-Joseph Guyonvarc'h has also proposed to interpret the name as 'great hunters'.

The river-name Veraglasca, located in their settlement area, derives from the ethnic name Veragri extended by a sko-suffix.

== Geography ==
=== Territory ===
The Veragri dwelled in the Pennine Alps, near a trade route connecting ancient Valais to the Italian Peninsula, where they organized traffic over the Great St Bernard Pass. The Barrington Atlas locates their territory south of the Nantuates, west of the Seduni and Uberi, northeast of the Allobroges, and north of the Salassi, on the other side of the Alps.

After the Roman conquered the region in 16–15 BC, their territory was initially administered in common with the province of Raetia et Vindelicia under a legatus, when they had their own civitas within the administrative region of Vallis Poenina. Following their integration into the Alpes Graiae et Poeninae by Claudius (41–54 AD), whose procurator occasionally had a residence in Octodurus, their chief town became the capital of the newly created civitas Vallensium, shared with the other Vallensian tribes.

=== Settlements ===
Their chief town was known as Octodurus (modern Martigny), whence the Veragri were called Octodurenses by Pliny. Mentioned by Caesar in the mid-1st century BC, the settlement was at that time a vicus (village) located in the plain of Martigny, at the foot of the Great St Bernard Pass.

Between 41 and 47 AD, the Romans founded a new settlement in the vicinity of Octodurus. Initially called Forum Claudii Augusti and soon renamed Forum Claudii Vallensium, it became the chief town of the civitas Vallensium and the Alpes Poeninae, one of the two divisions of the province of Alpes Graiae et Poeninae. During the Late Roman Empire, the name Octodurus, which had never ceased to be used by locals, came to designate the Roman settlement in official documents. Still prosperous by the late 4th century thanks to its strategic position near the Great St Bernard Pass, the settlement eventually declined from the early 5th century onwards, probably due to economic decline and insecurity. Between 549 and 585, Octodurus was eventually outshined by the nearby Sion, which replaced it as the host of the local episcopal see.

== History ==
In 57–56 BC, the Veragri were attacked by Caesar's legate Sulpicius Galba at the Battle of Octodurus.

During the same period Servius Galba, who was serving as his lieutenant, had, while the season lasted and his army remained a unit, brought to terms the Veragri, who dwelt along Lake Leman and beside the Allobroges as far as the Alps; some he had gained by force and others through surrender, and he was even preparing to winter where he was. When, however, the majority of the soldiers had departed, some on furlough because they were not far from Italy, and others elsewhere for reasons of their own, the natives took advantage of this situation and unexpectedly attacked him. Then Galba, driven mad by despair, suddenly dashed out of the winter camp, astounding his besiegers by the incredible boldness of his move, and passing through them, gained the heights. On reaching safety he fought them off and later subjugated them.

— Cassius Dio 1914. Rhōmaïkḕ Historía, 39:5:2.

They are mentioned by Pliny the Elder as one of the Alpine tribes conquered by Rome in 16–15 BC, and whose name was engraved on the Tropaeum Alpium.

== Primary sources ==
- Caesar (1917). The Gallic War. Loeb Classical Library. Translated by Edwards, H. J. Harvard University Press. ISBN 978-0-674-99080-7.
- Cassius Dio (1914). Roman History. Loeb Classical Library. Translated by Cary, Earnest; Foster, Herbert B. Harvard University Press. ISBN 978-0-674-99041-8.
- Livy (2019). History of Rome. Loeb Classical Library. Translated by Yardley, J. C. Harvard University Press. ISBN 978-0674992566.
- Pliny (1938). Natural History. Loeb Classical Library. Translated by Rackham, H. Harvard University Press. ISBN 9780674993648.

== Bibliography ==
- de Bernardo Stempel, Patrizia (2006). "From Ligury to Spain: Unaccented *yo > (y)e in Narbonensic votives ('gaulish' DEKANTEM), Hispanic coins ('iberian' -(sk)en) and some theonyms". Palaeohispanica. 6: 45–58. ISSN 1578-5386.
- Delamarre, Xavier (2003). Dictionnaire de la langue gauloise: Une approche linguistique du vieux-celtique continental. Errance. ISBN 9782877723695.
- Falileyev, Alexander (2010). Dictionary of Continental Celtic Place-names: A Celtic Companion to the Barrington Atlas of the Greek and Roman World. CMCS. ISBN 978-0955718236.
- Graßl, Herbert (2006a). "Veragri". Brill's New Pauly. doi:10.1163/1574-9347_bnp_e12200510.
- Graßl, Herbert (2006b). "Vallenses". Brill's New Pauly. doi:10.1163/1574-9347_bnp_e1228280.
- Talbert, Richard J. A. (2000). Barrington Atlas of the Greek and Roman World. Princeton University Press. ISBN 978-0691031699.
- Wiblé, François (2004). "Martigny / Octodurus (Suisse)". Supplément à la Revue archéologique du centre de la France. 25 (1): 451–456. ISSN 1951-6207.
- Wiblé, François (2009). "Forum Claudii Vallensium". Historisches Lexikon der Schweiz.
- Wiblé, François (2013). "Véragres". Historisches Lexikon der Schweiz.
