= Alpes Graiae et Poeninae =

Roman province

Coordinates: 46°N 7°E

Provincia Alpes Graiae et vallis Poenina Provincia Alpes Atrectianae et vallis Poenina
- Province of the Roman Empire
- 41/54 AD–476
- The Roman Empire c. 125 AD, with the province of Alpes Graiae et Poeninae highlighted
- Capital: Forum Claudii Ceutronum (Alpes Graiae/Atrectianae); Forum Claudii Vallensium (Alpes Poeninae)
- Historical era: Antiquity
  - Created by Claudius: 41/54 AD
  - Deposition of Romulus Augustulus: 476
Succeeded by
Kingdom of Italy (476-493)
- Today part of: France; Italy; Switzerland

The Alpes Graiae et Poeninae, also known by the 2nd century AD as Alpes Atrectianae et Poeninae, was a small Alpine province of the Roman Empire created after the merging of the Alpes Poeninae (or Vallis Poenina) and the Alpes Graiae (or Alpes Atrectianae). Comprising the modern Canton of Valais (Switzerland), the Tarantaise Valley, Beaufortain, Haut-Faucigny (France) and the Aosta Valley (Italy), it was one of the three provinces straddling the Alps between modern France and Italy, along with the Alpes Maritimae and Alpes Cottiae.

The Procurator of the province resided in the capital of this province: Axima, which became Forum Claudii Ceutronum (Aime-la-Plagne), former capital of the Alpes Graiae. He was seconded by a Praefectus in Octodorum, which became Forum Claudii Vallensium (Martigny) for the Alpes Poeninae.

== Name ==
=== Variants ===
In ancient documents, the province appears under the forms Alpes Graiae, Alpes Poeninae et Graiae (provincia Alpium Graiarum et Poeninarum), and Alpes Graiae et Poeninae. The rarer variant Alpes Atrectianae occurs in epigraphic material.

It may have been referred to as Alpes Graiae et Vallis Poenina at the time of its formation, which would represent an expanded form of Alpes Graiae et Poeninae. A Severian period inscription (193–235) attests the variant Alpium Atrectianarum et Vallis Poeninae, in which Atrectianae replaces Graiae as a local or epigraphic alternative.

The name Vallis Poenina survives in the modern toponyms Pennine Alps and Valais.

=== Origin ===
According to Livy, the name Alpes Poeninae derives from an indigenous deity named Poeninus, attested as Poininos on local inscriptions and in the cult title Jupiter Poeninus.

Xavier Delamarre has likewise proposed to identify a Celtic theonym *Graios (attested in Herculi / Herculeio Graio) as the origin of the name Alpes Graiae.

According to Guy Barruol, the form Alpes Atrectianae may derive from an otherwise unattested local king named *Atrectius, by analogy with the Alpes Cottiae, named after the local ruler Cottius. While the repeated occurrence of the cognomen Atrectianus among several governors of the province in the 2nd and 3rd centuries AD may lend some support to this hypothesis, no direct evidence for a local dynast named Atrectius exists, and such a figure remains hypothetical.

== History ==
=== Roman conquest and early administration ===
The region of Vallis Poenina, corresponding to the modern Canton of Valais between the Lake Geneva and the Great St. Bernard Pass, was inhabited at the time of the Roman conquest by Celtic tribes known as the Vallenses, namely the Nantuates, Veragri, Seduni, and Uberi. After the Roman invasion led by Augustus in 16–15 BC, the area was initially placed under military control (praefectus Raetis, Vindolicis, vallis Poeninae) and incorporated into the province of Raetia et Vindelicia, which stretched between the central Alps and the Danube.

=== Formation of the province ===
The Vallensian tribes were granted Latin Rights and grouped into a single civitas Vallensium during the reign of Claudius (41–54 AD). Most scholars associate this period with the beginning of the administrative reorganisation that eventually detached the Vallis Poenina from Raetia et Vindelicia and linked it to the Alpes Graiae, the Ceutron territory west of the Little St Bernard Pass. However, an inscription from Claudius's reign shows that the Vallis Poenina was still under the authority of the procurator of Raetia at that time, and the exact moment when the two Alpine districts were fully united remains uncertain.

By the 2nd century, the two regions formed the province of Alpes Graiae et Poeninae, with Axima (Forum Claudii Ceutronum, modern Aime-la-Plagne) serving as the chief town of the Graian division, and Octodurus (Forum Claudii Vallensium, modern Martigny) as the centre of the Poenine district. Some scholars date the definitive unification of the Alpes Graiae and Alpes Poeninae to the reign of Septimius Severus (193–211 AD) rather than to the reign of Claudius.

=== Late Antiquity and Early Middle Ages ===
During the administrative reforms of Diocletian (284–305), the province was integrated into the praeses of the Dioecesis Galliarum. In 381, the first Bishop of the region, Theodul, was mentioned. After the Fall of the Western Roman Empire, the region was invaded by the Burgundians and incorporated into their kingdom. After its fall, it was integrated into the Frankish Kingdom in 534, then briefly invaded by the Lombards in 574.

== Gallery ==
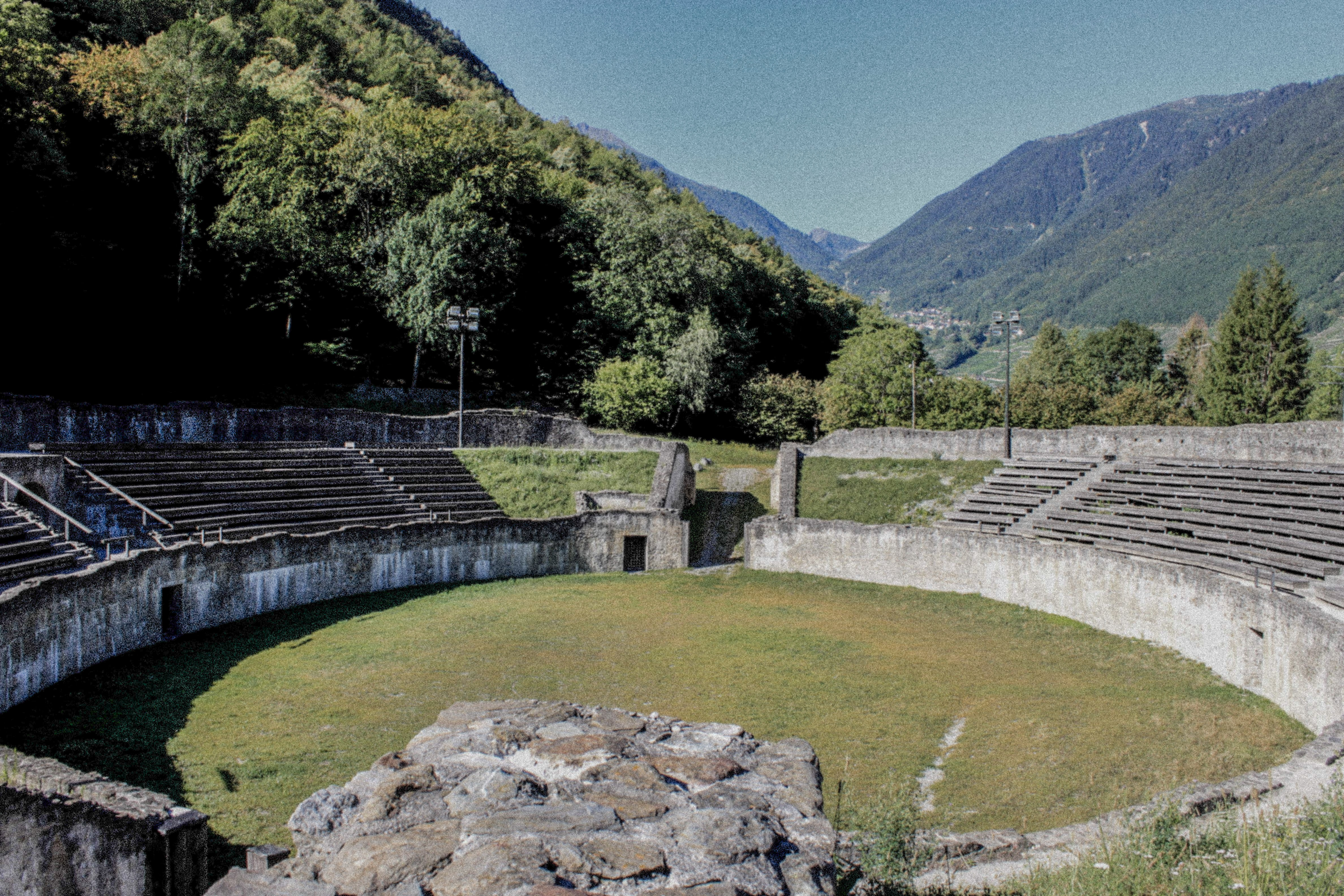
Amphitheater in Martigny

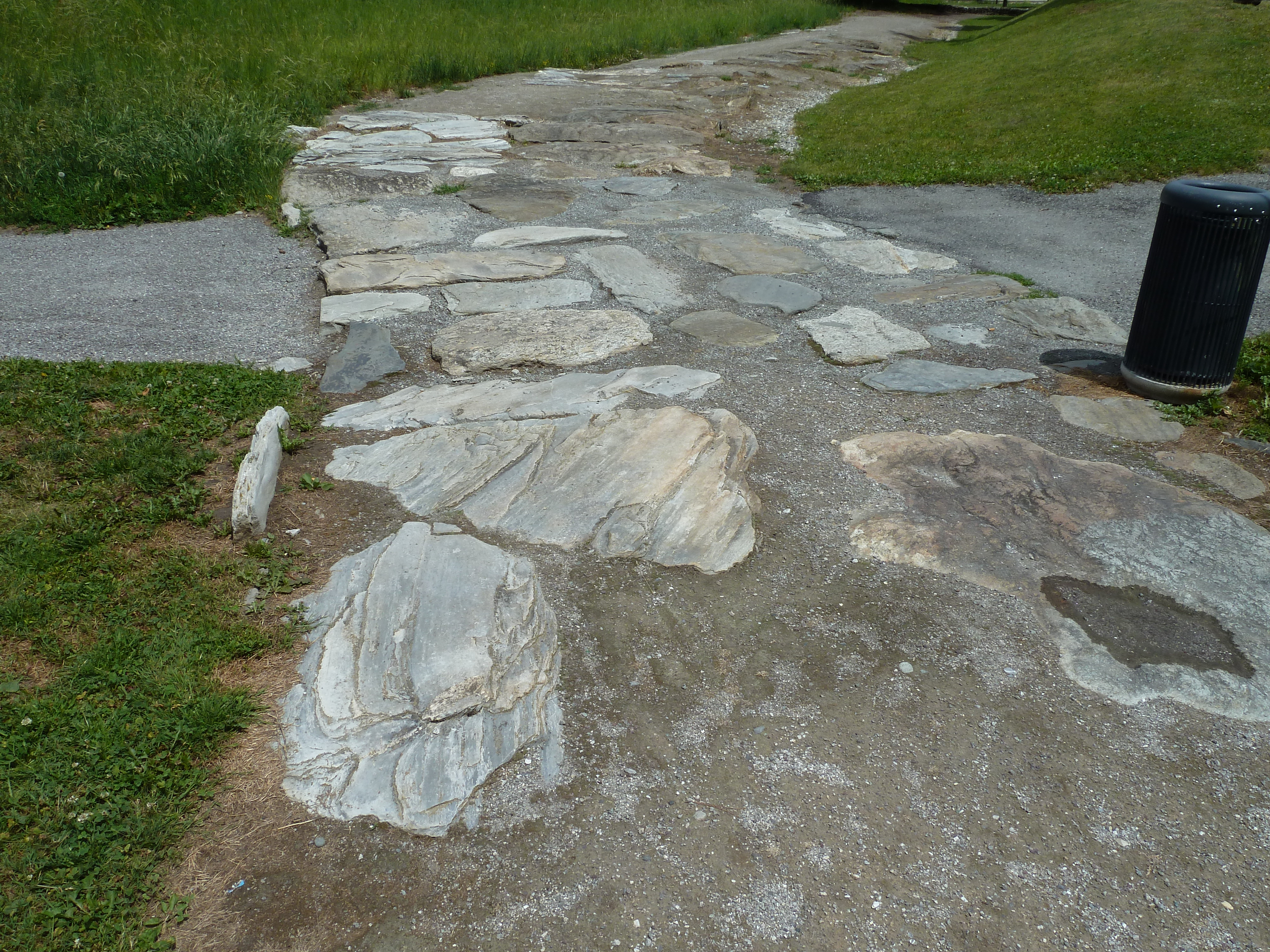
Roman road in Martigny
