= Servius Sulpicius Galba (praetor 54 BC) =

Roman senator and assassin of Julius Caesar

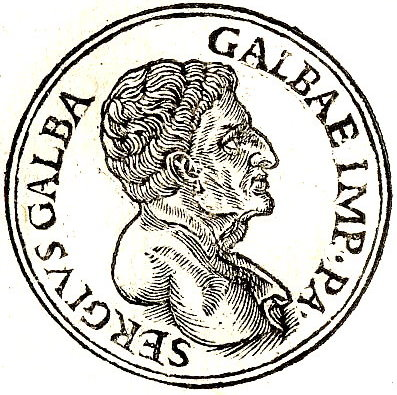
Servius Sulpicius Galba from Promptuarii Iconum Insigniorum

Servius Sulpicius Galba was a Roman general and politician, praetor in 54 BC, and an assassin of Julius Caesar.

As legate of Julius Caesar's 12th Legion during his Gallic Wars, he defeated the Nantuates in 57 BC in the Battle of Octodurus.

Servius Galba then had a dispute with Caesar over a debt, also felt his friendship with Caesar cost him the consular election in 49 BC. In 45 BC, Galba complained that the Senators were not given their proper respect. According to Suetonius, Caesar had an affair with Galba's wife Postumia, which caused more anger.

Later, angered by Caesar's opposition to his campaign for the consulship, Servius Galba joined the conspiracy with Brutus and Cassius, and was consequently condemned to death by the Pedian law. He was the great-grandfather of the Roman Emperor of the same name.

== See also ==
- Assassination of Julius Caesar
- Sulpicia gens – Ancient Roman family
