= Nantuates =

Gallic tribe

The Nantuates or Nantuatae (Gaulish: Nantuatis, 'those of the valley') were a Gallic tribe dwelling around present-day Massongex, in the modern Canton of Valais (Switzerland) and adjacent areas of France, during the Iron Age and the Roman period.

Along with the Veragri, Seduni and Uberi, they were part of the Vallenses, a group of tribes living between Lake Geneva and the Pennine Alps.

== Name ==
They are mentioned as Nantuates (var. nantuatis, antuatis), Nantuatibus and Nantuatium by Caesar (mid-1st c. BC), Nantuates by Pliny (1st c. AD), Nantoua͂tai (Ναντουᾶται) by Strabo (early 1st c. AD), and as Nantuani on the Tabula Peutingeriana (5th c. AD).

The ethnonym Nantuates is a latinized form of Gaulish Nantuatis, which literally means 'those of the valley', that is 'the people of the valley'. It derives from the stem nantu- ('valley, stream'; cf. Middle Welsh nant 'valley, water-course, stream', Old Cornish nans 'vallis') extended by the suffix -ates ('belonging to').

The modern town of Nantua is named after the tribe.

== Geography ==
The Nantuates dwelled in the upper Rhône valley, between Lake Geneva and Saint-Maurice, near the Great St Bernard Pass trade route, where they organized trade between Lake Geneva and the Italian Peninsula. The Barrington Atlas locates their territory northeast of the Allobroges, north of the Veragri, west of the Seduni, and south of the Helvetii.

After the Roman conquered the region in 16–15 BC, their territory was initially administered in common with the province of Raetia et Vindelicia under a legatus, when they had their own civitas within the administrative region of Vallis Poenina. Their political role declined following their integration into the Alpes Graiae et Poeninae by Claudius (41–54 AD), with the creation of a single civitas (civitas Vallensium) shared with the other Vallensian tribes.

Their pre-Roman chief town, known as Tarnaiae (modern Massongex), was occupied since at least 50 BC. Named after the Celtic god Taranis, it probably hosted a sanctuary dedicated to the deity, later identified with Jupiter in Roman times through interpretatio romana. The city flourished in the 1st and 2nd centuries AD, with thermal baths, warehouses, and numerous workshops and shops.

== History ==
They are mentioned by Pliny the Elder as one of the Alpine tribes conquered by Rome in 16–15 BC, and whose name was engraved on the Tropaeum Alpium.
