= Corno del Camoscio =

Mountain in Italy

- German: Gemshorn; Walser: Gemschòre
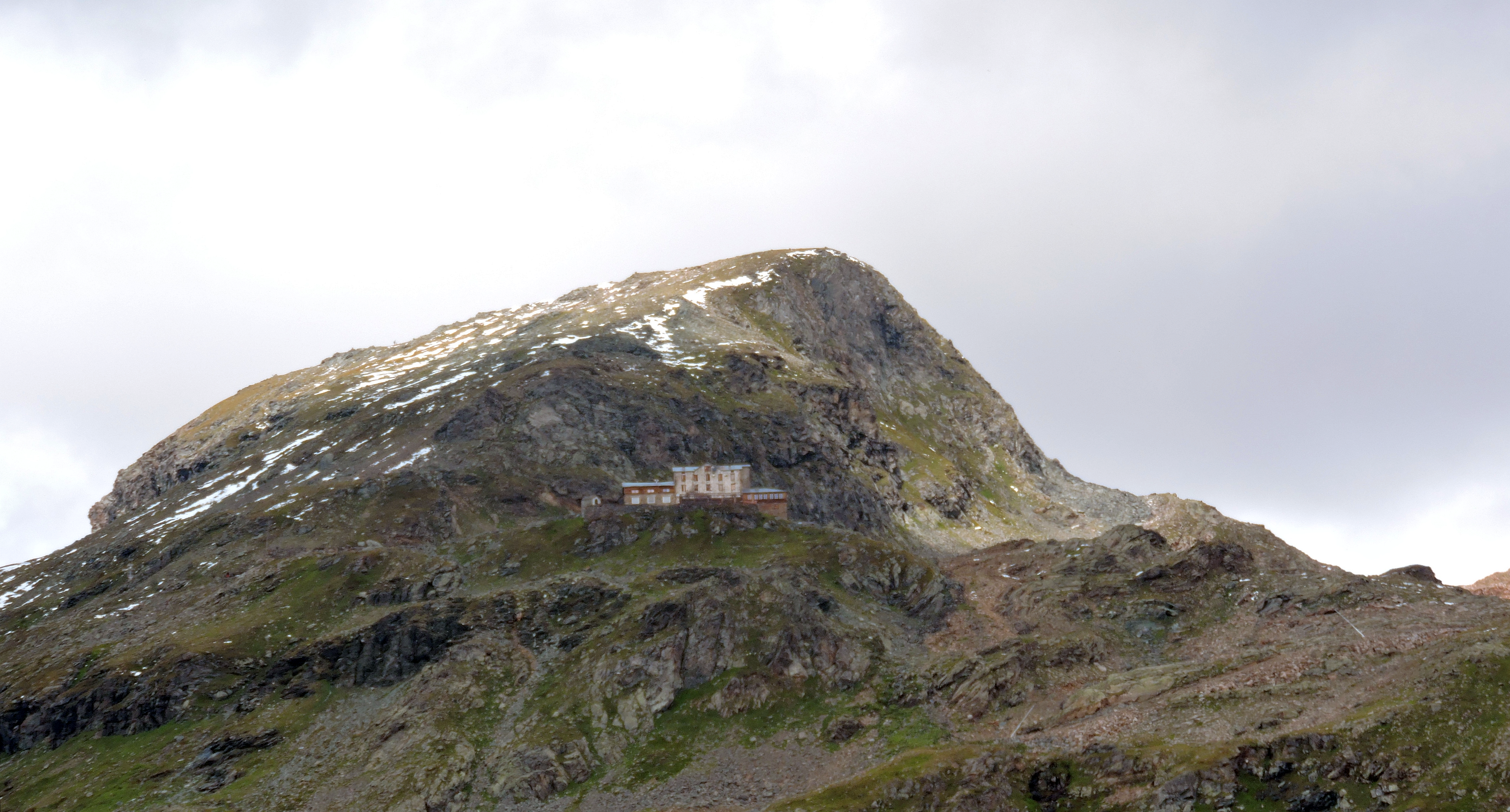
- Corno del Camoscio seen from Passo Foric

Highest point
- Elevation: 3,024 m (9,921 ft)
- Prominence: 88 m (289 ft)
- Isolation: 1.02 km (0.63 mi)

Geography
- Location: Piedmont and Aosta Valley, Italy
- Parent range: Pennine Alps

The Corno del Camoscio (German: Gemshorn, Walser: Gemschòre) is a mountain of the Pennine Alps, between the Valsesia and the Lys Valley, with an elevation of 3,024 metres (9,921 ft).

== Description ==
Part of the Monte Rosa massif, it is located on the border between the Italian municipalities of Alagna Valsesia, in Piedmont, and Gressoney-La-Trinité, in the Aosta Valley. The Passo dei Salati, to its north, divides it from the Stolemberg; the Col d'Olen, to its south, divides it from the Corno Rosso.

It is possible to reach the panoramic peak on short hiking paths from both passes; a nature trail runs around the summit. The currently abandoned Rifugio Città di Vigevano lies to its southwest.
