= Gressoney =

Gressonney may refer to two villages and communes in the Aosta Valley region of Italy:

- Gressoney-La-Trinité
- Gressoney-Saint-Jean
- Gressoney (AO), the single commune into which they were united during the years 1928–46

== See also ==
- Gresson
