= Corno Rosso =

Mountain in Italy

- Walser: Ròthòre
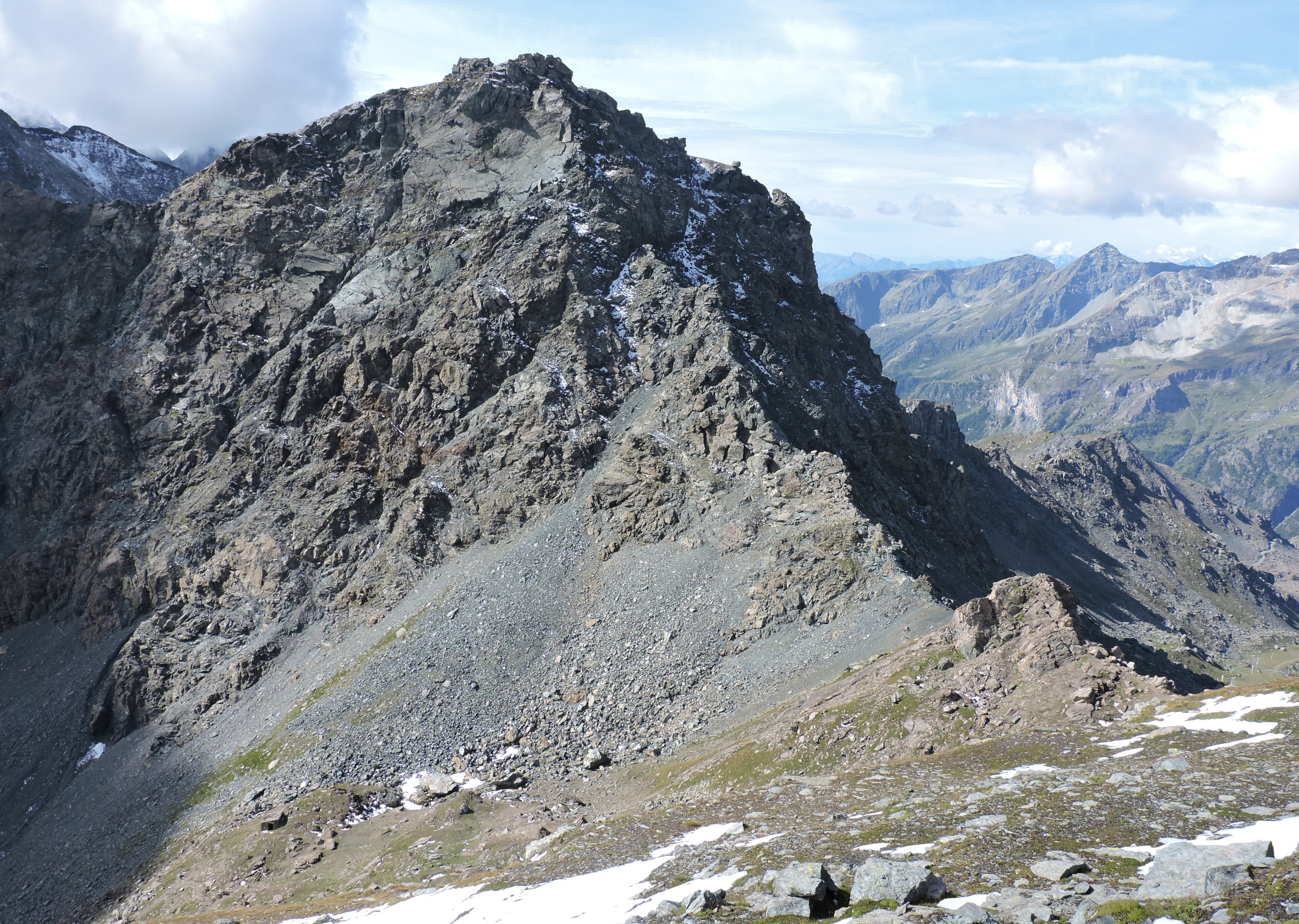
- Corno Rosso seen from Corno del Camoscio

Highest point
- Elevation: 3,023 m (9,918 ft)
- Prominence: 142 m (466 ft)
- Coordinates: 45°52′02″N 7°52′08″E

Geography
- Location: Piedmont and Aosta Valley, Italy
- Parent range: Pennine Alps

The Corno Rosso (Walser: Ròthòre) is a mountain of the Pennine Alps, in northwestern Italy, with an elevation of 3,023 metres (9,918 ft).

Part of the Monte Rosa massif, it is located on the border between the municipalities of Alagna Valsesia, Piedmont, and Gressoney-La-Trinité, Aosta Valley, on the drainage divide between the Lys Valley and the Valsesia. The Zube Pass, to its South, divides it from the Punta Straling; the Col d'Olen, to its north, divides it from the Corno del Camoscio.

The peak can be reached with a scramble from the Zube Pass, or, with greater difficulty, from Col d'Olen.
