= Bilingual sign =

Sign with text in more than one language

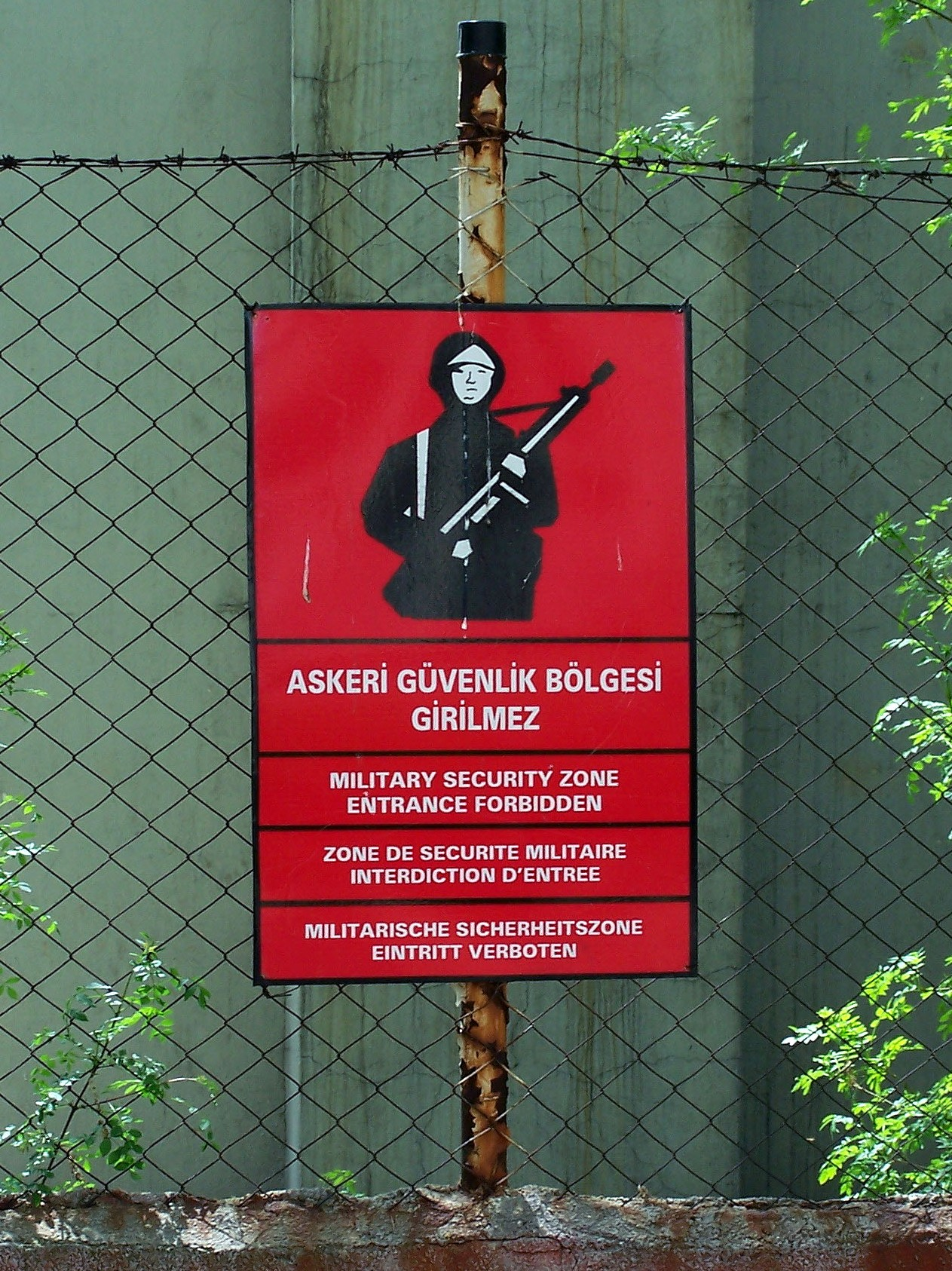
Warning sign at the fence of a military area in Turkey, in Turkish, English, French and German

A bilingual sign (or, by extension, a multilingual sign) is the representation on a panel (sign, usually a traffic sign, a safety sign, an informational sign) of texts in more than one language. The use of bilingual signs is usually reserved for situations where there is legally administered bilingualism (in bilingual regions or at national borders) or where there is a relevant tourist or commercial interest (airports, train stations, ports, border checkpoints, tourist attractions, international itineraries, international institutions, etc.). However, more informal uses of bilingual signs are often found on businesses in areas where there is a high degree of bilingualism, such as tourist venues, ethnic enclaves and historic neighborhoods. In addition, some signs feature synchronic digraphia, the use of multiple writing systems for a single language.

Bilingual signs are widely used in regions whose native languages do not use the Latin alphabet (although some countries like Spain or Poland use multilingual signs); such signs generally include transliteration of toponyms and optional translation of complementary texts (often into English). Beyond bilingualism, there is a general tendency toward the substitution of internationally standardized symbols and pictograms for text.

== Around the world ==
The use of bilingual signs has experienced a remarkable expansion in recent years. The increase in bilingualism there has been paralleled by increases in international travel and a greater sensitivity to the needs of ethnic and linguistic minorities.

=== Europe ===
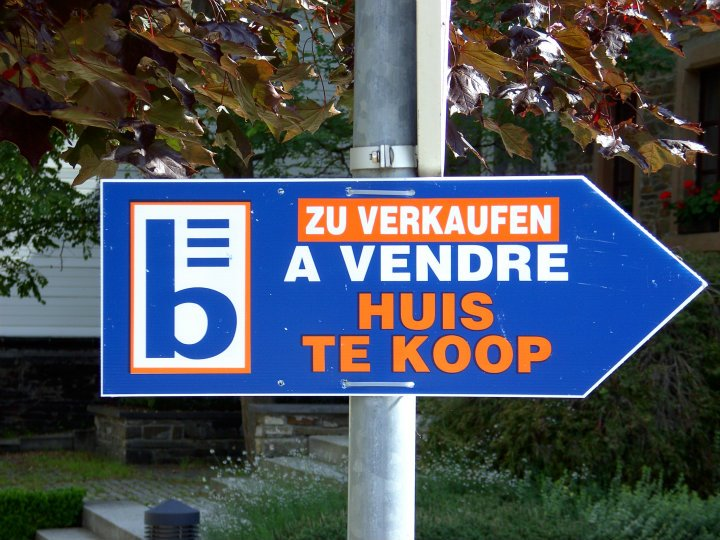
Trilingual sign in Burg-Reuland, German-speaking Belgium in German, French and Dutch reading "house for sale"

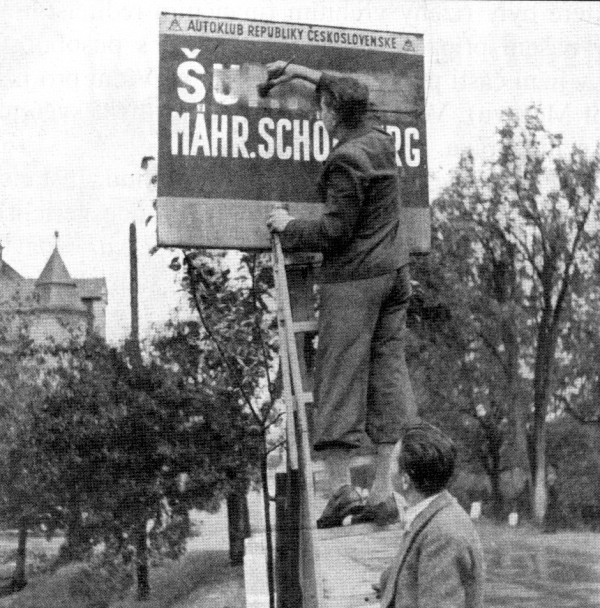
Šumperk-Mährisch Schönberg, Czech names erased by Sudeten Germans after German annexation of Sudetenland in 1938

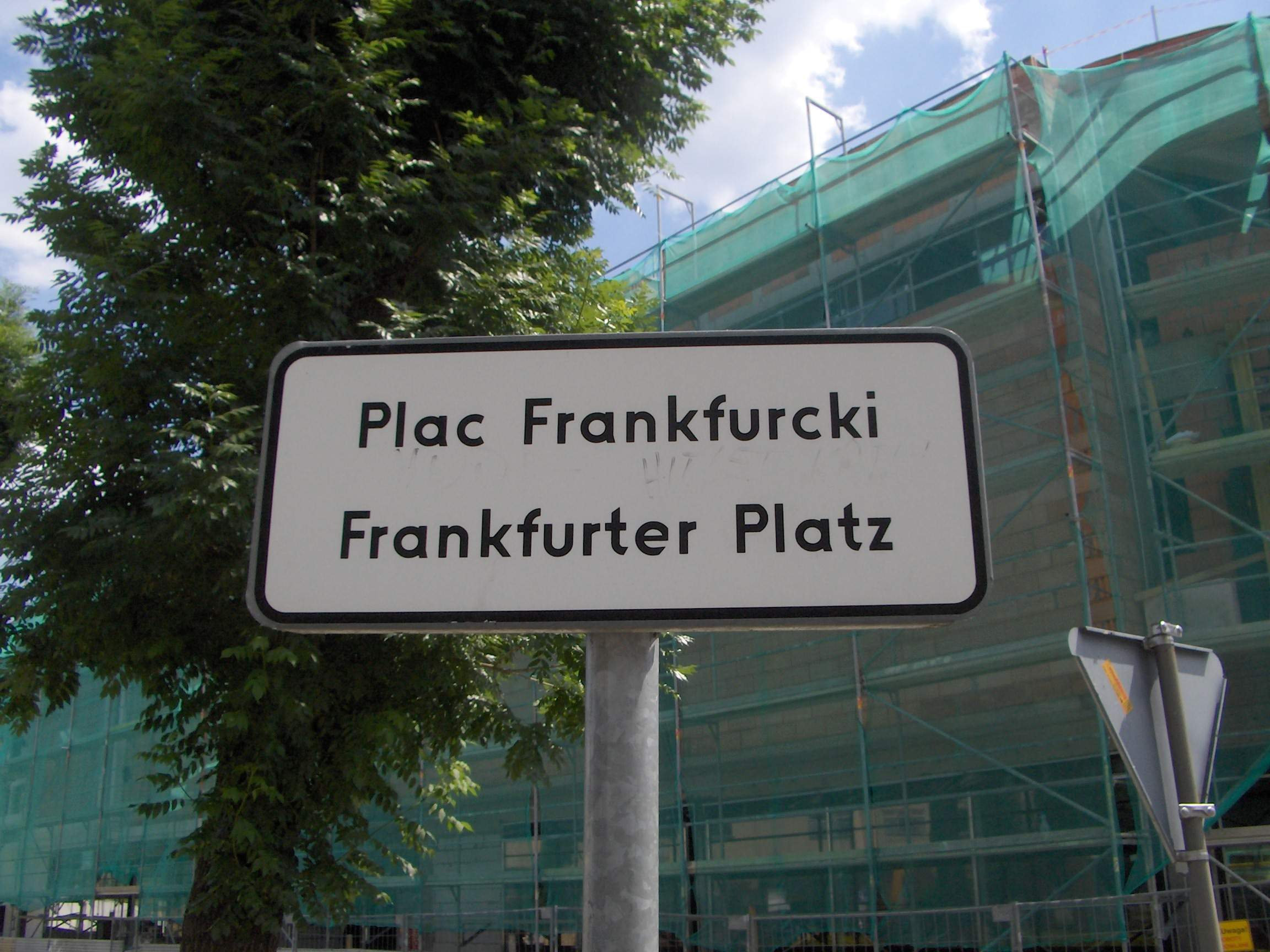
Bilingual sign in Slubice, Poland, near Frankfurt (Oder)

Bilingual signs arose in places like Belgium where, because of the cohabitation of Dutch-speaking and French-speaking communities (especially in the central part of the country near Brussels), bilingualism signaled a simple willingness to accommodate all citizens equally. As a result, all street signs in the Brussels-Capital Region are bilingual in Dutch and French.

Switzerland has several cantons (Bern, Fribourg, Valais and Graubünden) and towns (e.g. Biel/Bienne, Murten, Fribourg, Siders and Disentis/Mustér), where two, or in one case (Graubünden) even three languages have official status and therefore the signs are multilingual. With Biel/Bienne, both the German and the French name of the town are always officially written with the compound name; and similarly with Disentis/Mustér (German/Romansh).

In Italy, German-speaking South Tyrol was annexed during World War I and eventually became the focus of assimilation policies. The same assimilation process took place in the French-speaking Aosta Valley. In observance of international treaties after World War II, Italy was compelled to acknowledge and accommodate these language minorities through the use of bilingual signs. Though road signs always appear in both German and Italian, in the Aosta Valley official road and directional signs are normally bilingual in Italian and French, reflecting the region's special status under Italian law, however exceptions exist: in some cases, signs appear only in Italian, while in others they may be found solely in French. In addition, the Walser-speaking municipalities of Gressoney-Saint-Jean and Gressoney-La-Trinité, located in the upper Lys Valley, feature trilingual signage, as German is recognised as co-official alongside French and Italian in these two communes. The situation of the Slovene minority living in the Trieste, Gorizia and Udine provinces is very different as only in recent years have the bilingual signs become visible and only in smaller villages.

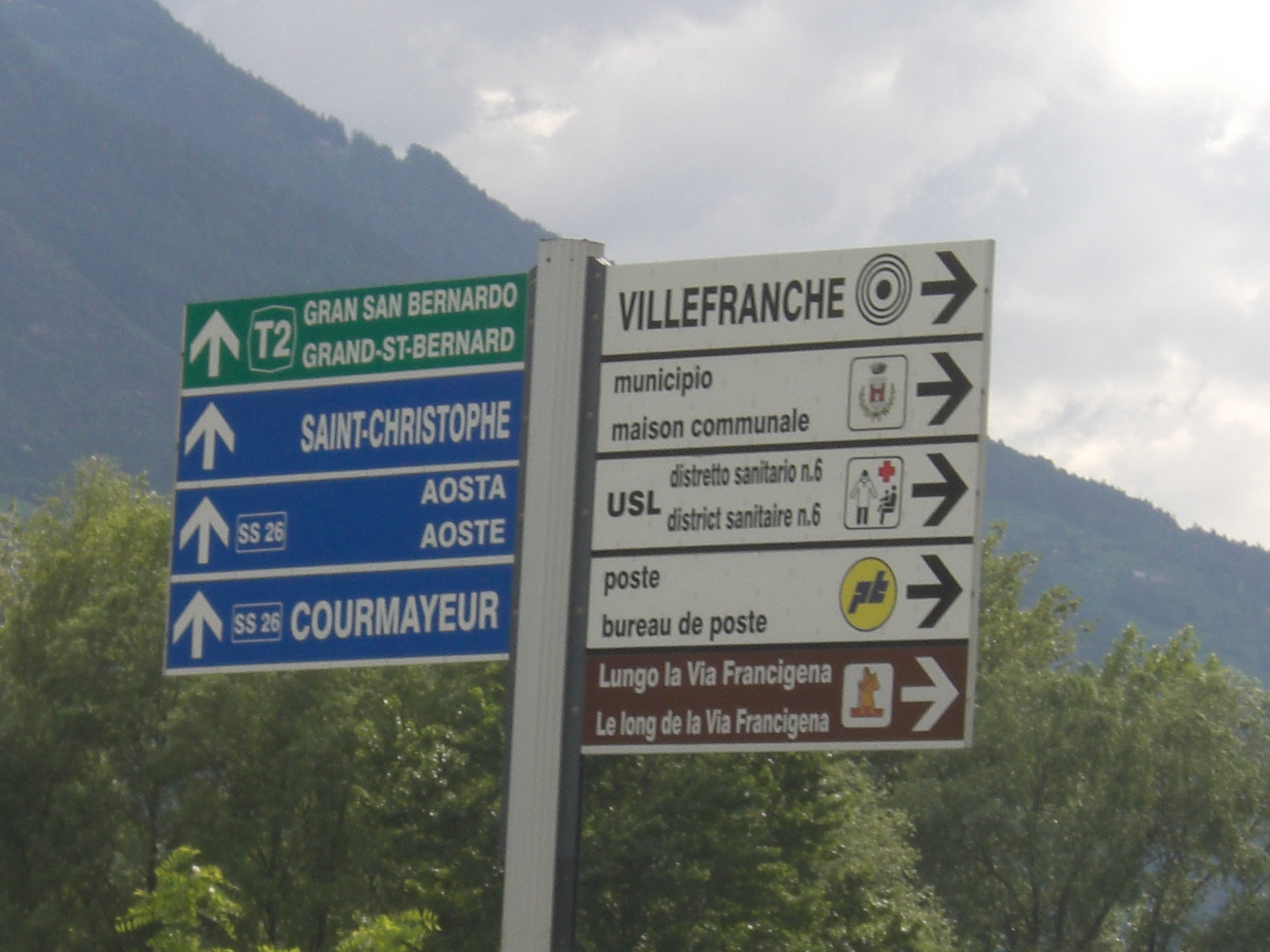
Bilingual Italian–French road signs in Quart, Aosta Valley

In Greece, virtually all signs are bilingual, with the Greek text in yellow and the English in white. If a sign is in Greek only, an equivalent sign in English will often be situated nearby.

In Spain, bilingual signs in the local language and Spanish appear irregularly in the autonomous communities of Galicia, Basque Country, Navarre, Catalonia, Valencian Community and the Balearic Islands.

Bilingual signs are also used in the Republic of Ireland, with all roads, towns, important buildings etc. named in both the Irish and English languages. The Irish appears on the top of the sign (usually in italic text) with the English underneath. The exception to this is in Gaeltacht regions, where only Irish language signage tends to be used.

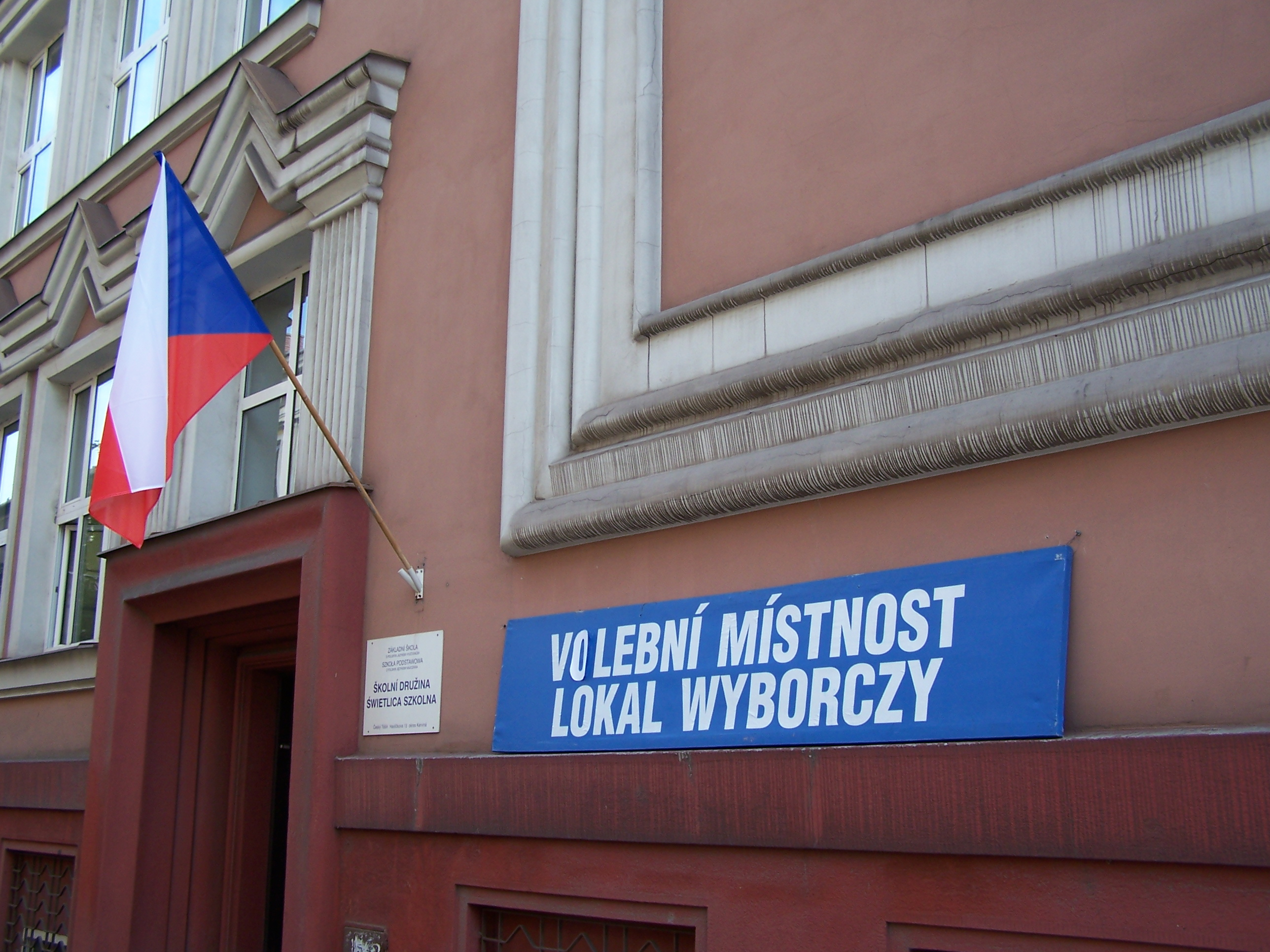
Bilingual Czech–Polish sign during the 2006 municipal elections in Český Těšín, Czech Republic

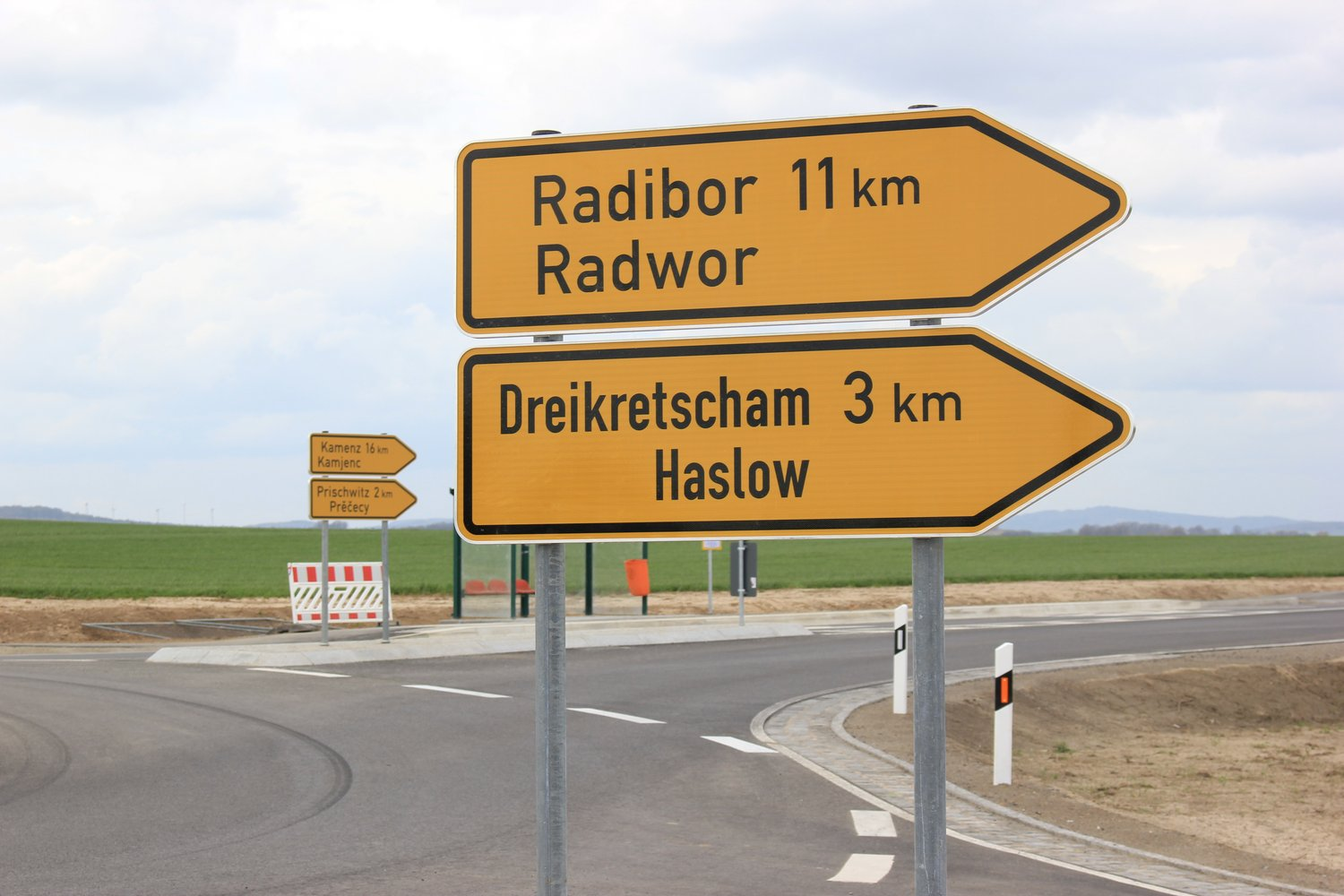
German–Sorbian road sign near Bautzen (Saxony)

In Germany, first bilingual German–Sorbian road and street signs as well as city-limit signs and train station signs were introduced in the 1950s in Lusatia. After reunification, at least bilingual city-limit signs were also adapted in some regions, were Danish or Frisian are spoken. In Brandenburg and Saxony, German and Sorbian place names nowadays have to be shown in the same size, with German names on the top.

In Finland, multilingual signs appeared at the end of the 19th century. The signs were in the official languages Swedish, Finnish and, during that period, also Russian. After the independence of Finland, the signs became bilingual Finnish–Swedish in the official bilingual areas of the country and bilingual Finnish–Sami in the northern parts.

In the United Kingdom, bilingual signs are used various parts of the country. In Wales, Welsh and English are official languages and most road signs are bilingual. Until 2016 each local authority decided which language is shown first, from 2016 new signage will feature Welsh first. In Scotland, Scottish Gaelic is increasingly visible on road signs, not only in the north-west and on the islands, but also on main primary routes. Railway station signs and signs on public buildings such as the Scottish Parliament are increasingly bilingual. In Northern Ireland, some signs in Irish and/or Ulster Scots are found. In Cornwall, some signs such as street names are found in English and Cornish; and similarly in the Crown Dependency of the Isle of Man in English and Manx Gaelic.

In parts of Slovenia, where languages other than Slovene are official (Italian in parts of Slovenian Istria and Hungarian in parts of Prekmurje), the law requires all official signs (including road signs) to be in both official languages. This regulation is not always strictly enforced, but nevertheless all road signs in these areas are bilingual.

In many regions of Poland bilingual signs are used: Polish and Ruthenian in Lemkivshchyna, Polish and German in Upper Silesia and other locations (e.g. in Slubice), Polish and Lithuanian in Puńsk commune and Polish and Kashubian in Pomerania.

European airports have signs that are generally bilingual with the local language and English, although there are significant variations between countries. In multilingual countries such as Belgium and Switzerland, airports generally have signs in three or four languages. Some airports, such as Amsterdam Airport Schiphol, are used primarily by international travellers, and choose to use monolingual English signs, even though they are located in a country whose native language is not English.

=== North America ===
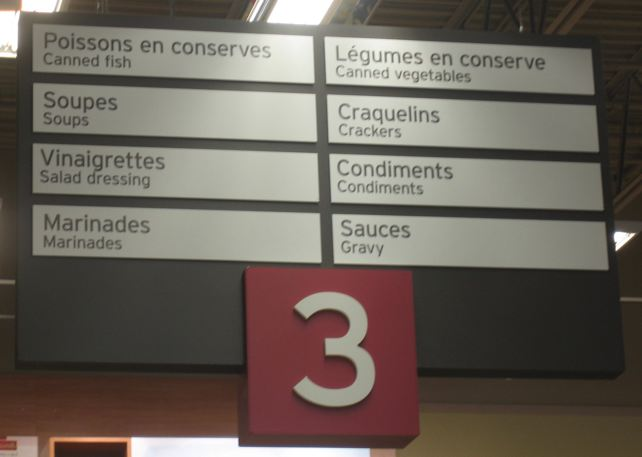
Bilingual French–English sign in a Quebec supermarket, with French texts in a larger font than the English texts

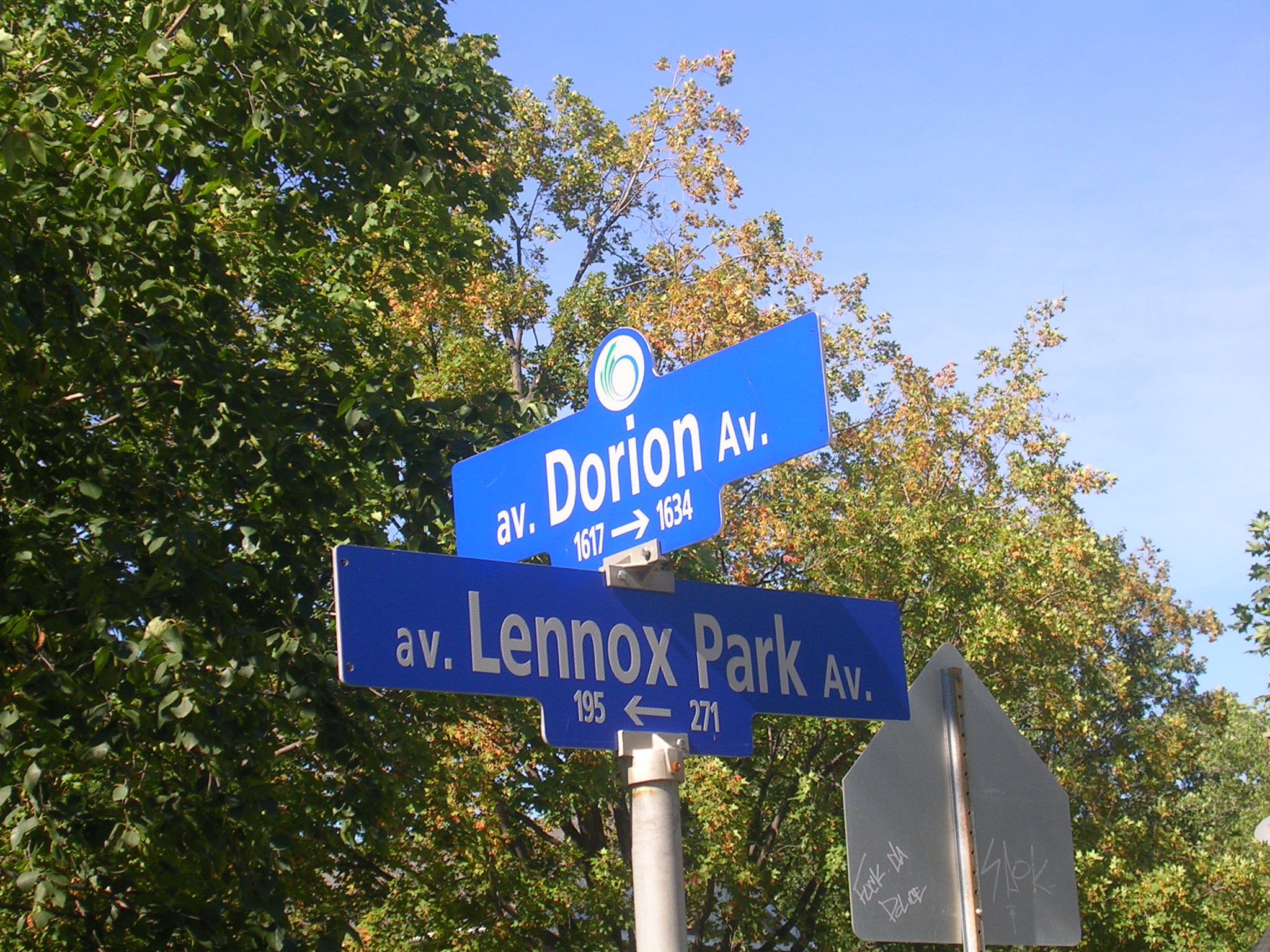
Bilingual English–French street signs in Ottawa, Ontario

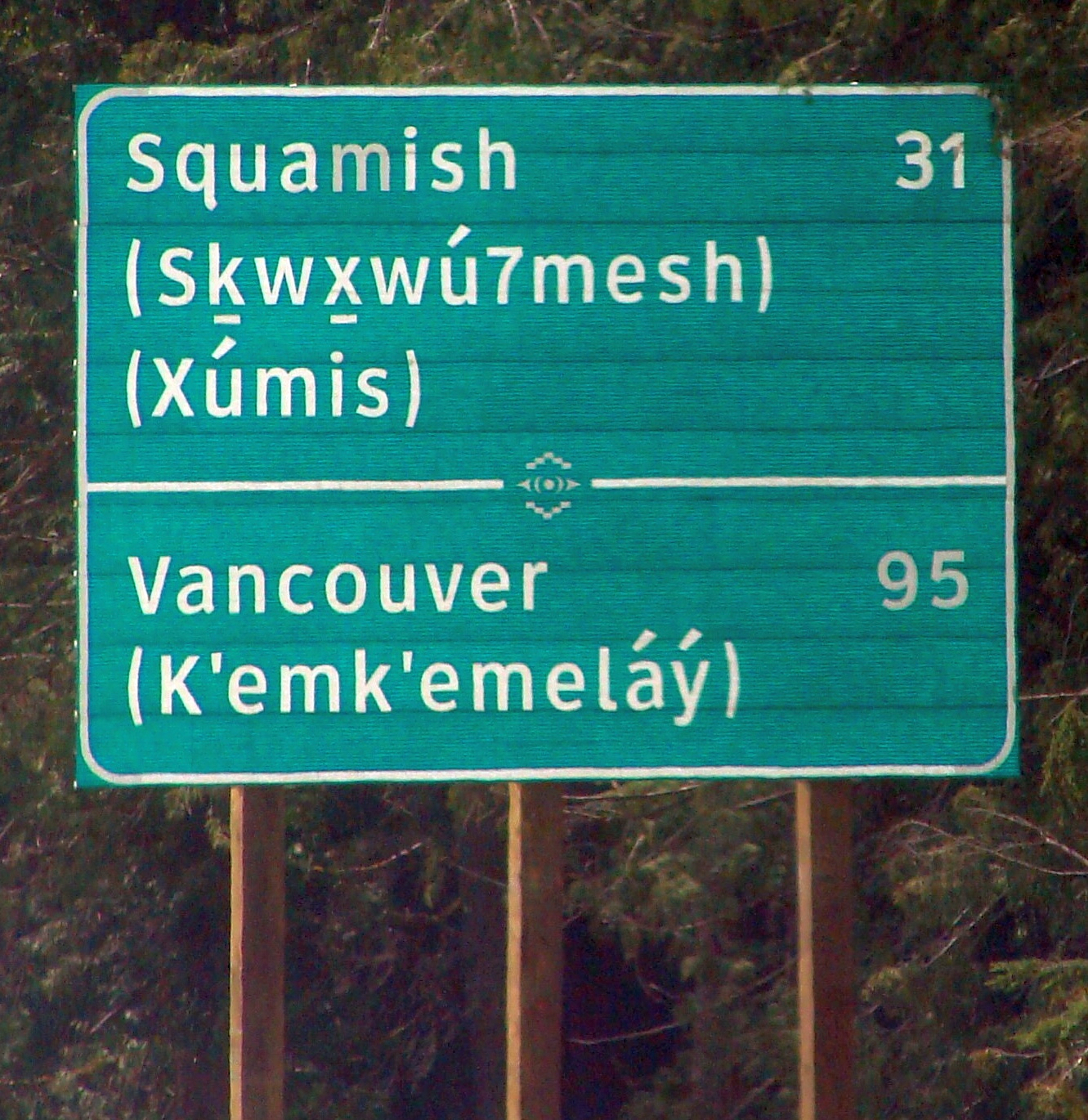
Bilingual English–Squamish road sign in British Columbia

The Government of Canada and the Province of New Brunswick are officially bilingual in English and French, so all signs issued or regulated by those governments are bilingual regardless of where they are located. Provincial road signs are also bilingual in French-designated areas of Manitoba and Ontario. Each local authority decides which language is shown first. In Ottawa, the national capital, the municipal government is officially bilingual so all municipal traffic signs and road markers are bilingual. Since airports are regulated by the federal government, most airports in Canada have bilingual signs in English and French.

In the Province of Nova Scotia, particularly on Cape Breton island, a number of place-name signs are bilingual in English and Scottish Gaelic.

Although Nunavut, an Inuit territory, is officially multi-lingual in English, French, Inuktitut and Inuinnaqtun, municipal road signs have remained in English only, other than stop signs. Some other road signs in various parts of Canada include other indigenous languages, such as the English/Squamish road sign in British Columbia shown here.

Quebec is officially monolingual in French, and the use of other languages is restricted under the Charter of the French Language. Commercial signs in Quebec are permitted to include text in languages other than French as long as French is "markedly predominant".

At places near the U.S.–Mexico border, some signs are bilingual in English and Spanish, and some signs near the U.S.–Canada border are bilingual in English and French. Additionally, large urban centers such as New York City, Chicago and others have bilingual and multilingual signage at major destinations. There are a few English and Russian bilingual signs in western Alaska. In Texas, some signs are required to be in English and Spanish. In Texas areas where there are large numbers of Spanish speakers, many official signs as well as unofficial signs (e.g. stores, churches, billboards) are written in Spanish, some bilingual with English, but others in Spanish only. In and around New Britain, Connecticut, it is not uncommon to see signs in Spanish and Polish as well as English.

In 2016, Port Angeles, Washington, installed bilingual signs in English and the indigenous Klallam languages to preserve and revitalize the area's Klallam culture.

New York City's Chinatown has English–Chinese signs. Seattle's Chinatown/Japantown has English–Chinese and English–Japanese signs.

=== Asia ===
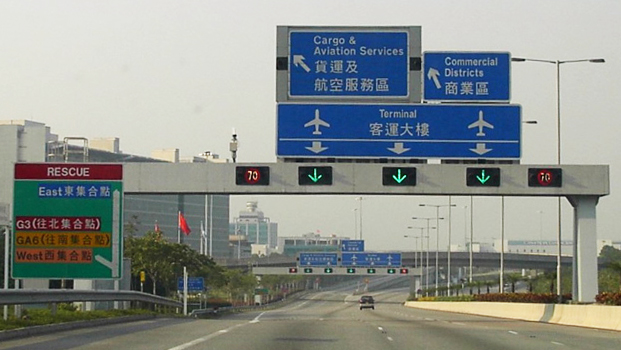
Bilingual English–Chinese traffic sign in Hong Kong

In the People's Republic of China, bilingual signs are mandated by the government in autonomous regions where a minority language shares official status with Chinese. In Xinjiang, signs are in Uyghur and Chinese; in Tibet, signs are in Tibetan and Chinese; and in Inner Mongolia, signs are in Mongolian (written in the classical alphabet) and Chinese. In Guangxi, the majority of signs are in Chinese, even though the Zhuang language is official in the region. Smaller autonomous areas also have similar policies. Signs in the Yanbian Korean Autonomous Prefecture, which borders North Korea, are in Korean and Chinese. Many areas of Qinghai province mandate bilingual signs in Tibetan and Chinese. In Beijing and Shanghai, due to international exposure of the 2008 Summer Olympics and Expo 2010, almost all city traffic signs are now bilingual with Chinese and English (during the Olympics, signs on Olympic venues were also in French). English use in signs is growing in other major cities as well.

In Hong Kong and Macau, government signs are normally bilingual with Traditional Chinese and English or Portuguese, respectively. This is because, in addition to Chinese, English and Portuguese are official languages of Hong Kong and Macau, respectively. Trilingual road signs in English, Portuguese and traditional Chinese are seen in some newly developed areas of Macau.

In Israel, road signs are often trilingual, in Hebrew, Arabic and English.

In India, road signs are often multilingual, in Hindi, English and other regional languages. In addition, signs in Hindustani often feature synchronic digraphia, with an Urdu literary standard written in Arabic script and a High Hindi standard written in Devanagari.

In Sri Lanka, official road signs are in Sinhala, Tamil and English.

In Turkey bilingual (Turkish and Kurdish) village signs are used in Eastern Anatolia region. Airports and touristic areas include an English name after the Turkish name.

In the Gulf states such as Saudi Arabia, road signs are often bilingual, in English and Arabic. Other signs (e.g. building signs) may also be displayed in English and Arabic.

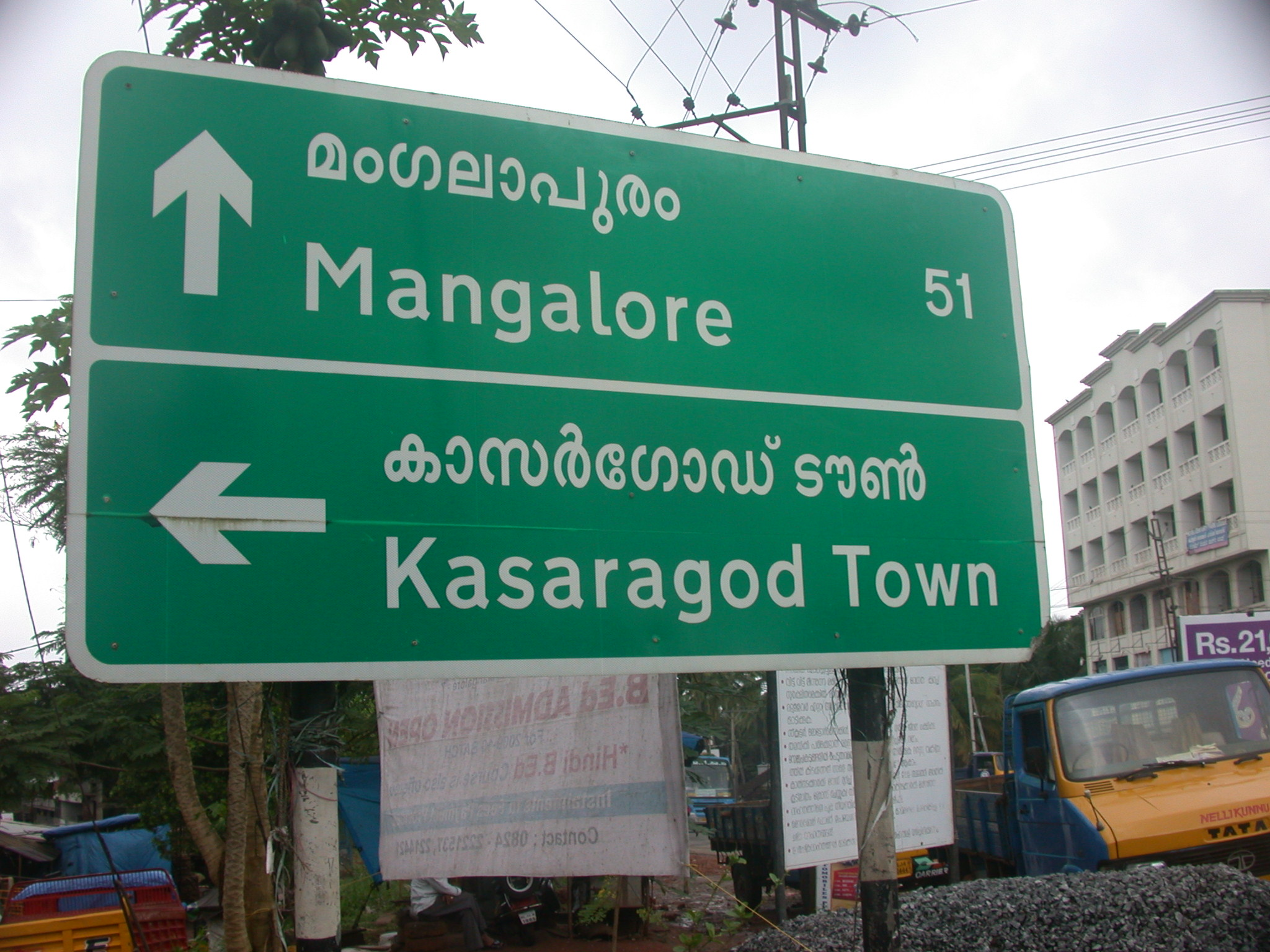
Bilingual Malayalam–English road sign at Kerala in India

=== Oceania ===
A give way sign used on Home Island.

Road signs on Home Island, part of the Cocos (Keeling) Islands in Australia, are bilingual in English and Cocos Malay, the dominant language on the island due to the majority of its population being Cocos Malays. In other parts of Australia, while multilingual signage can be found due to the country's culturally and linguistically population as well as its status as a global tourist destination, road signs are almost always only in English.

In New Zealand, bilingual road signage in Māori (which was made an official language of the country by the Māori Languages Act 1987 and reaffirmed by the Māori Language Act 2016) and English is becoming more and more common, with bilingual signage having first been introduced by the centre-left Labour government of Prime Ministers Jacinda Ardern and later Chris Hipkins in 2023. Initially, public opinion on the introduction of bilingual signs was divided.

== Gallery ==
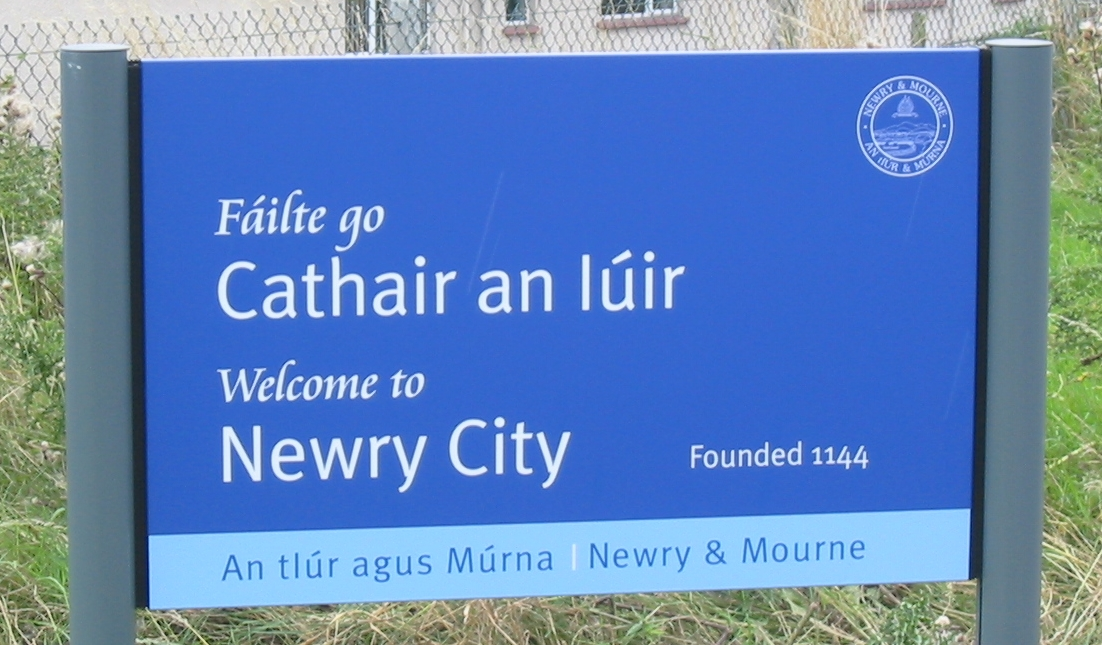
Bilingual welcome sign at Newry in Northern Ireland in Irish and English

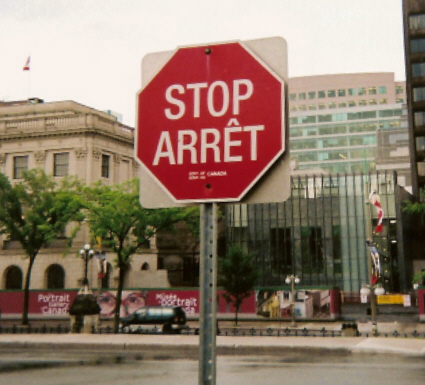
Bilingual stop sign in Ottawa, Ontario, Canada, in English and French

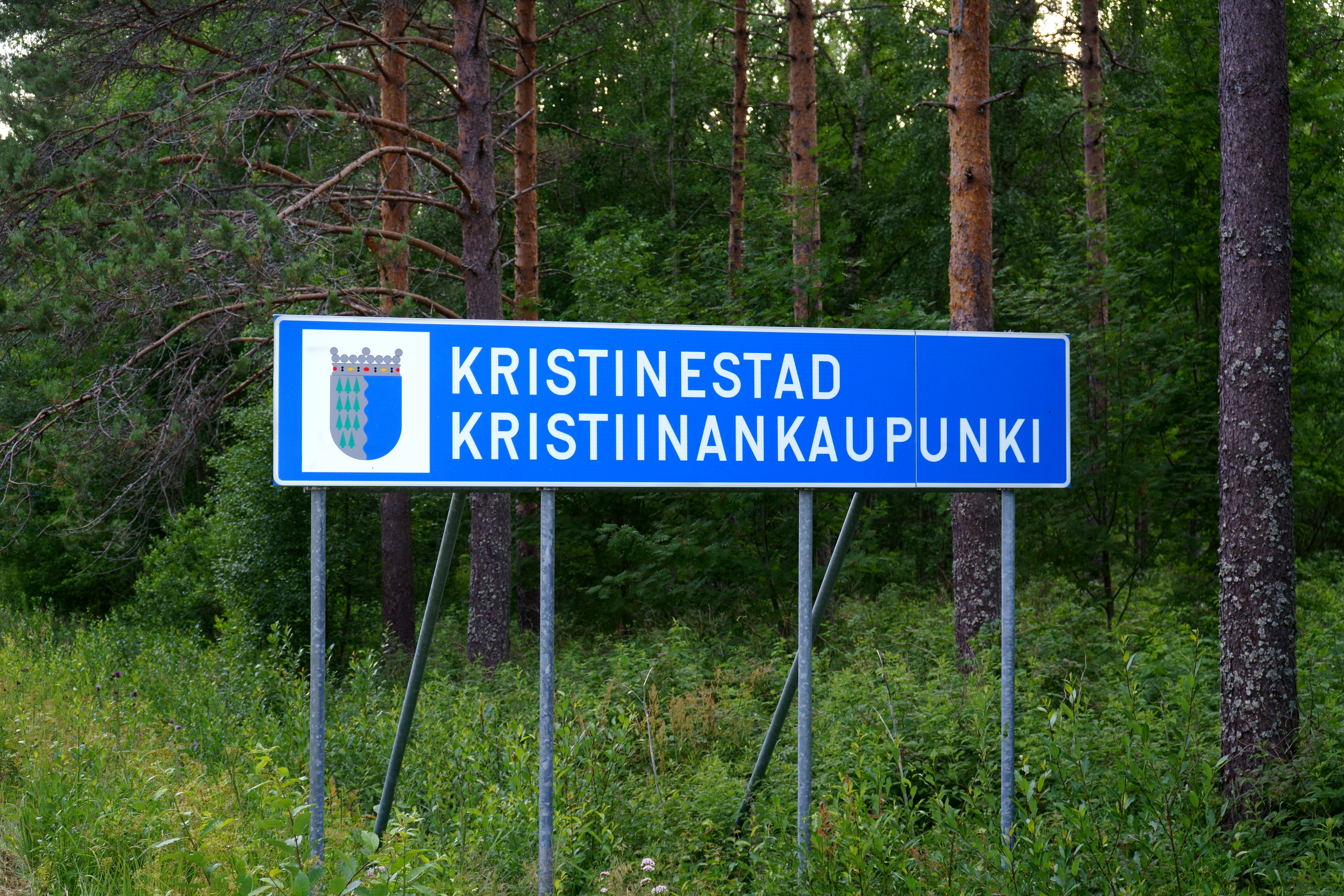
Bilingual town border sign of Kristinestad in Swedish and Finnish

Quadrilingual sign at Brussels-South railway station in French, Dutch, German, and English

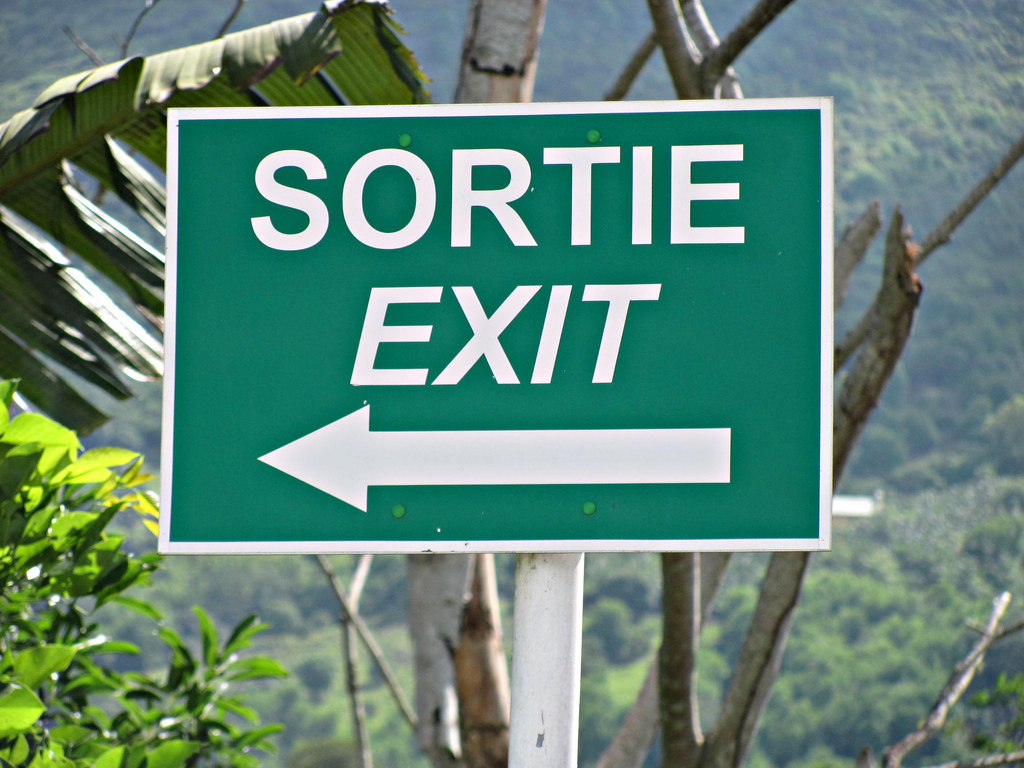
An exit sign in Mauritius in French and English

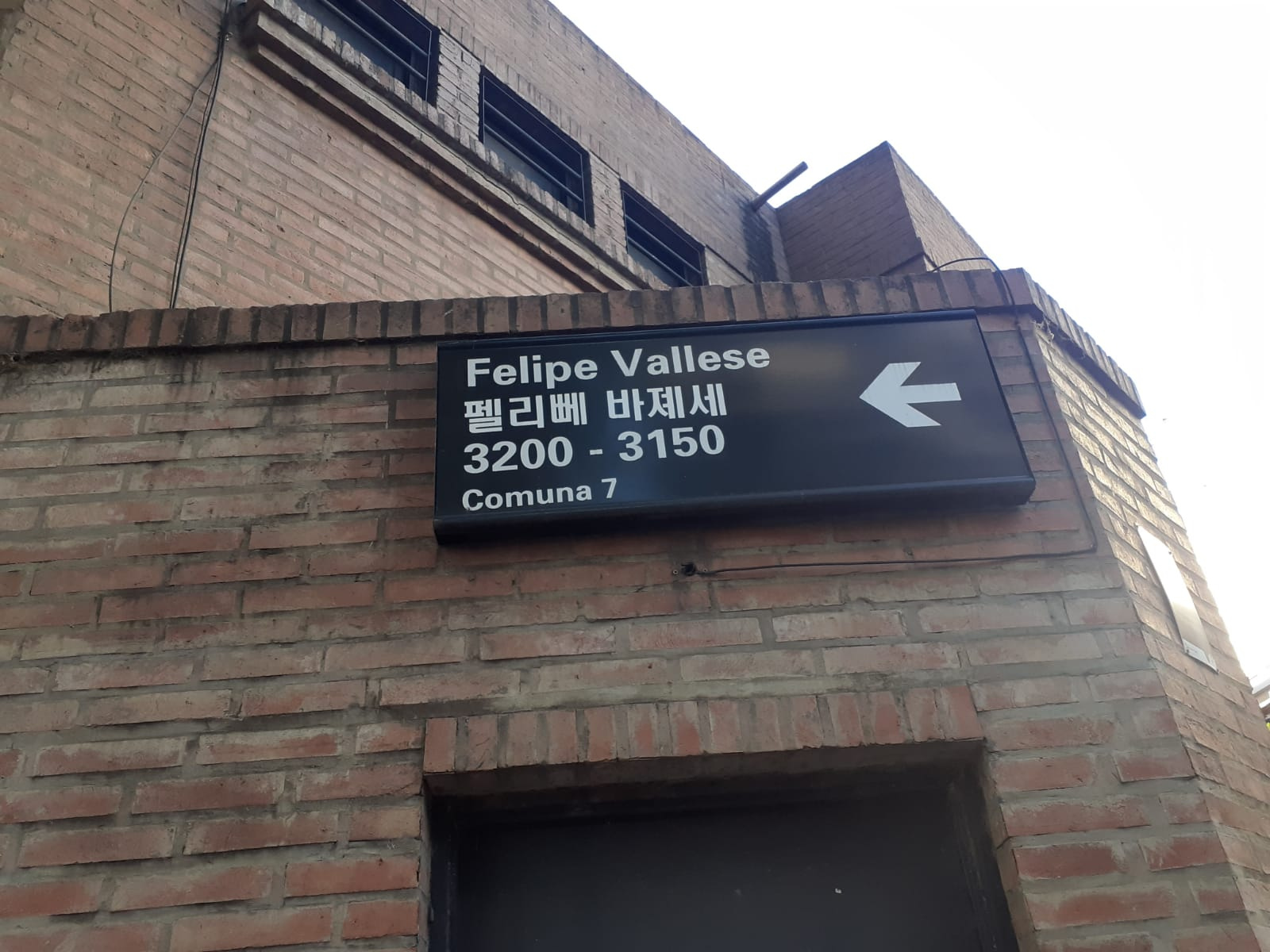
A bilingual sign at Buenos Aires in Argentina, in Spanish and Korean

Trilingual sign in Hohhot, Inner Mongolia, China, in Mongolian, Chinese and English

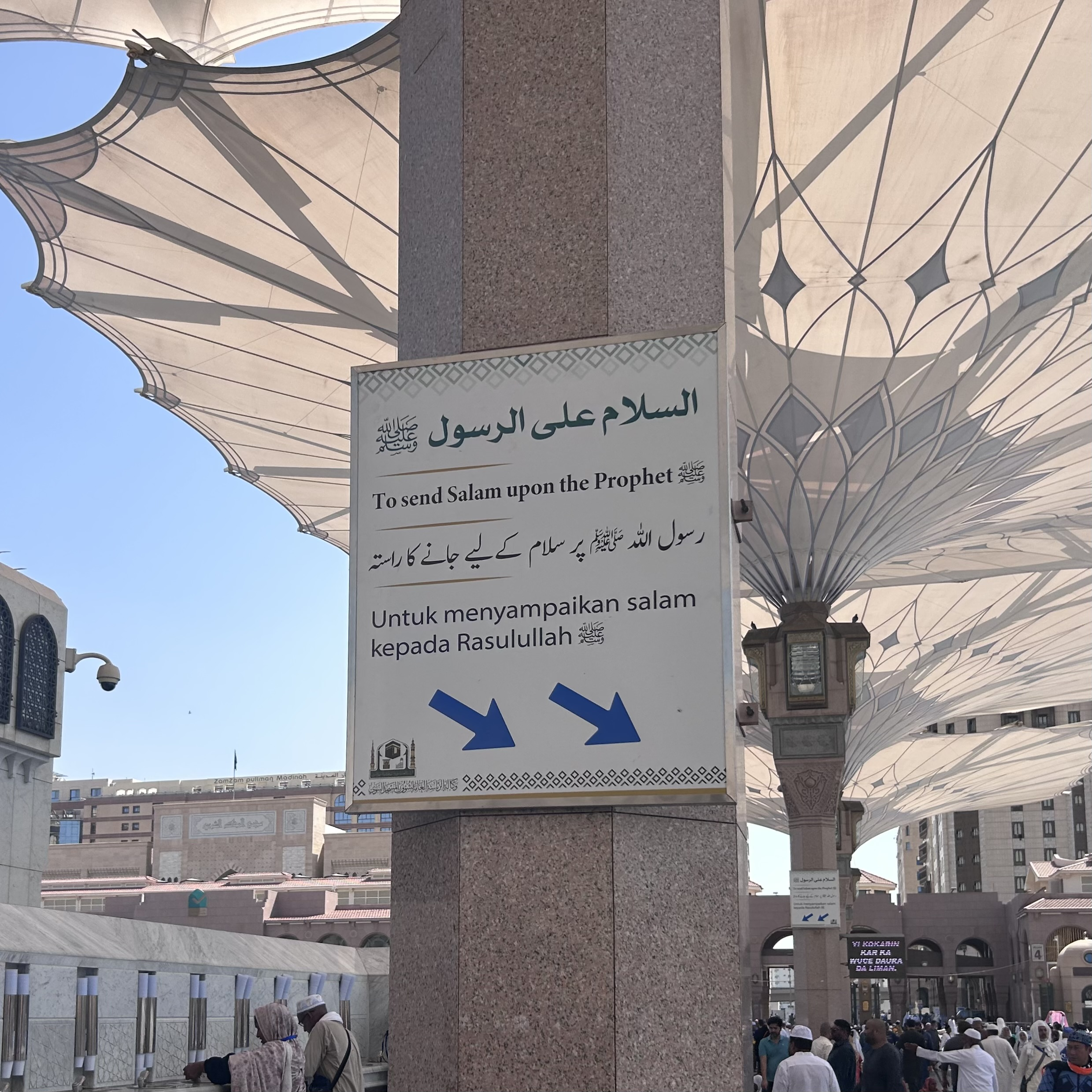
Quadrilingual sign in Masjid Nabwi, with Arabic at the top, followed by English, Urdu and Indonesian

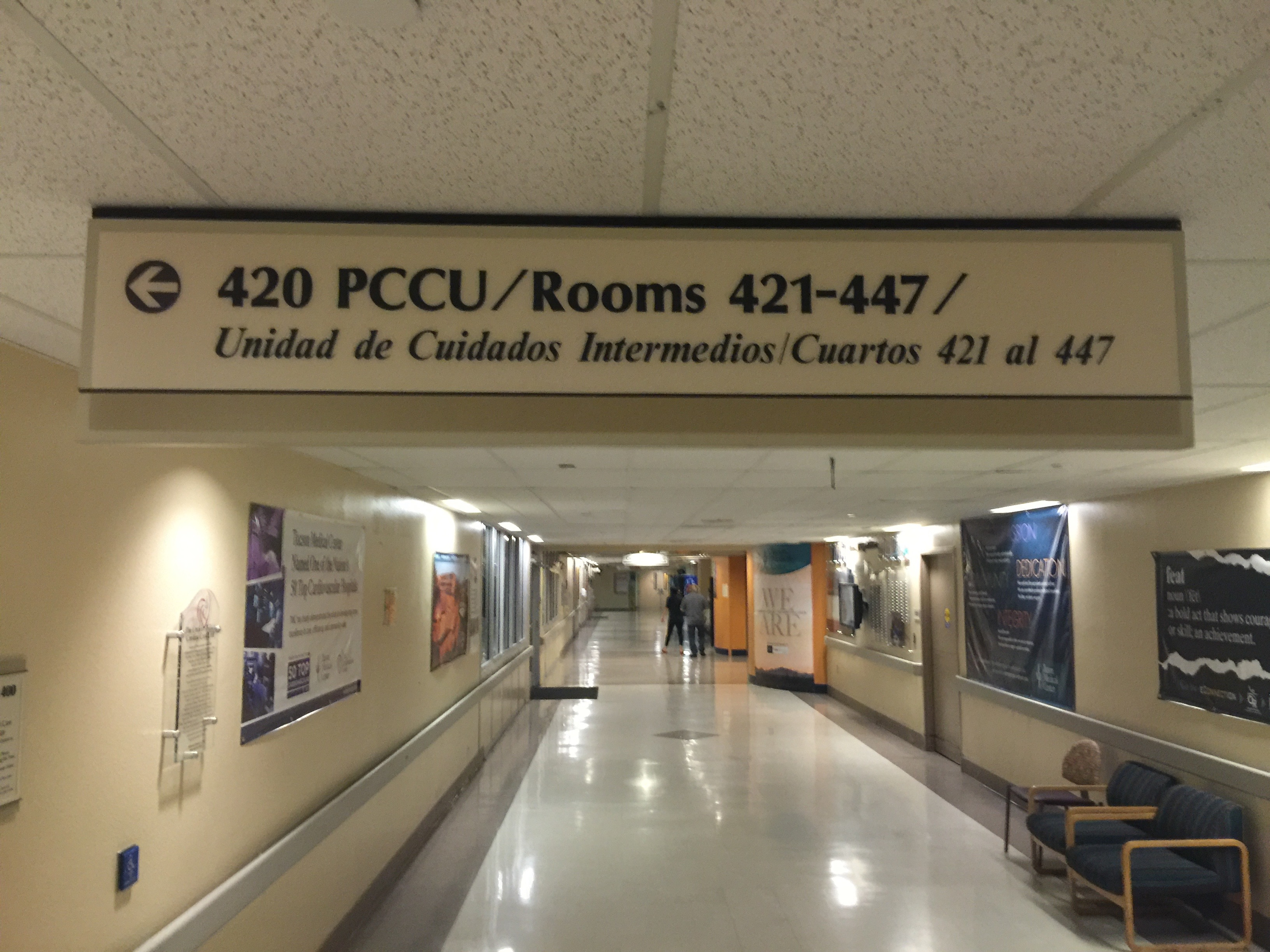
A sign at Tucson Medical Center in Tucson, Arizona, U.S., in Spanish and English

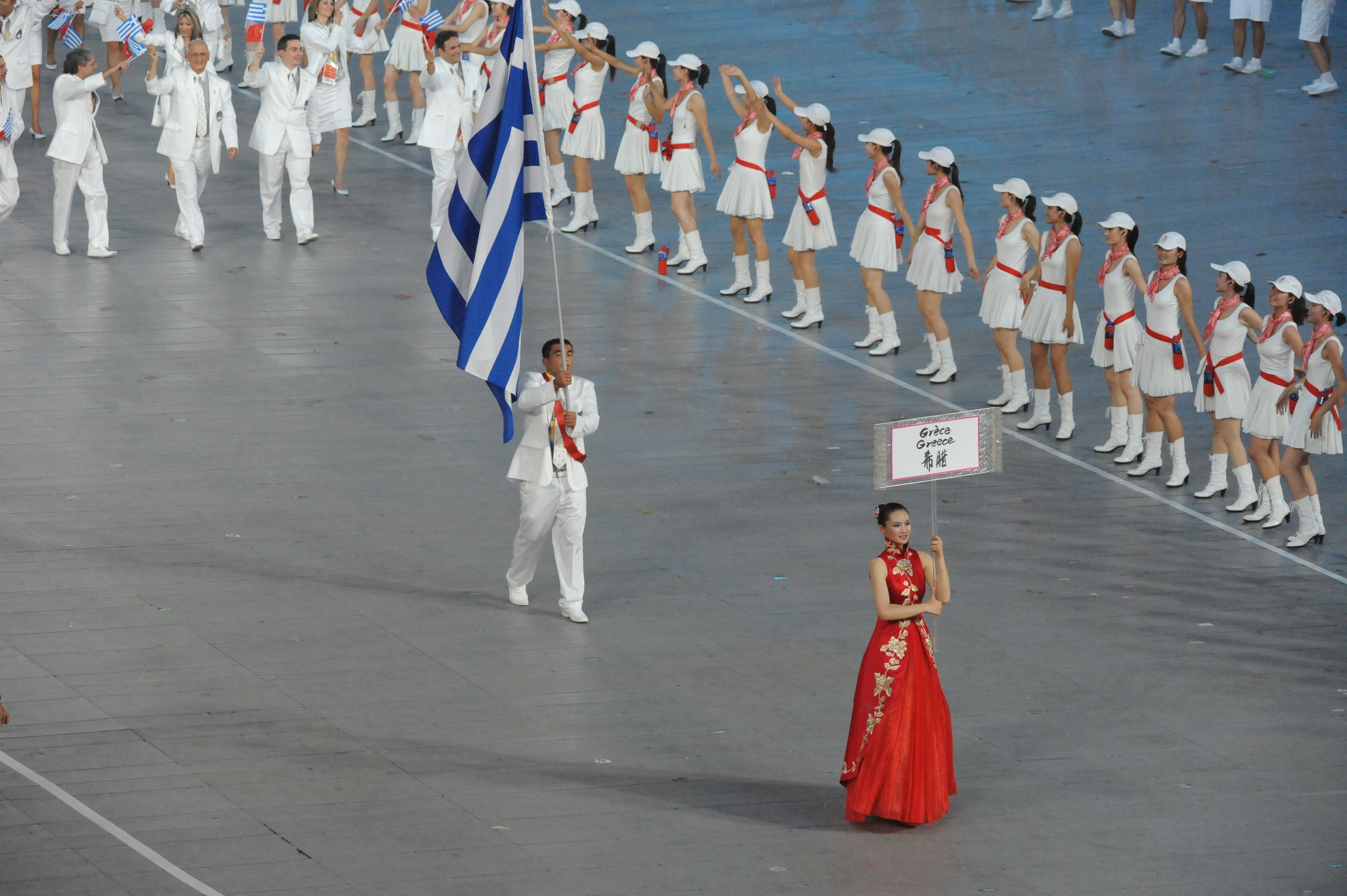
The 2008 Summer Olympics Parade of Nations signs were in French, English and Simplified Chinese.

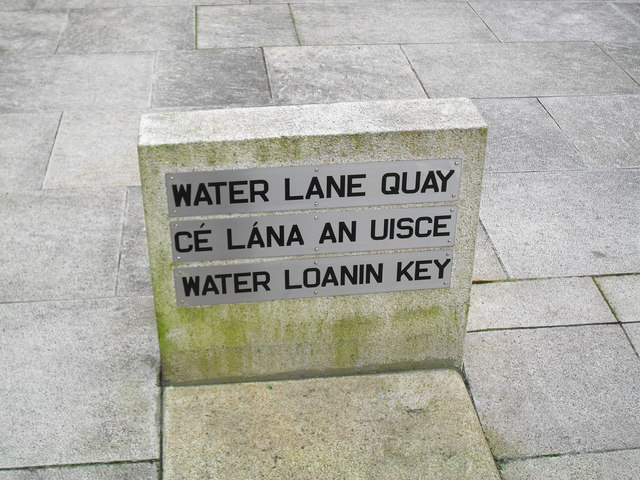
Trilingual sign in Enniskillen, Northern Ireland, in English, Irish and Ulster Scots

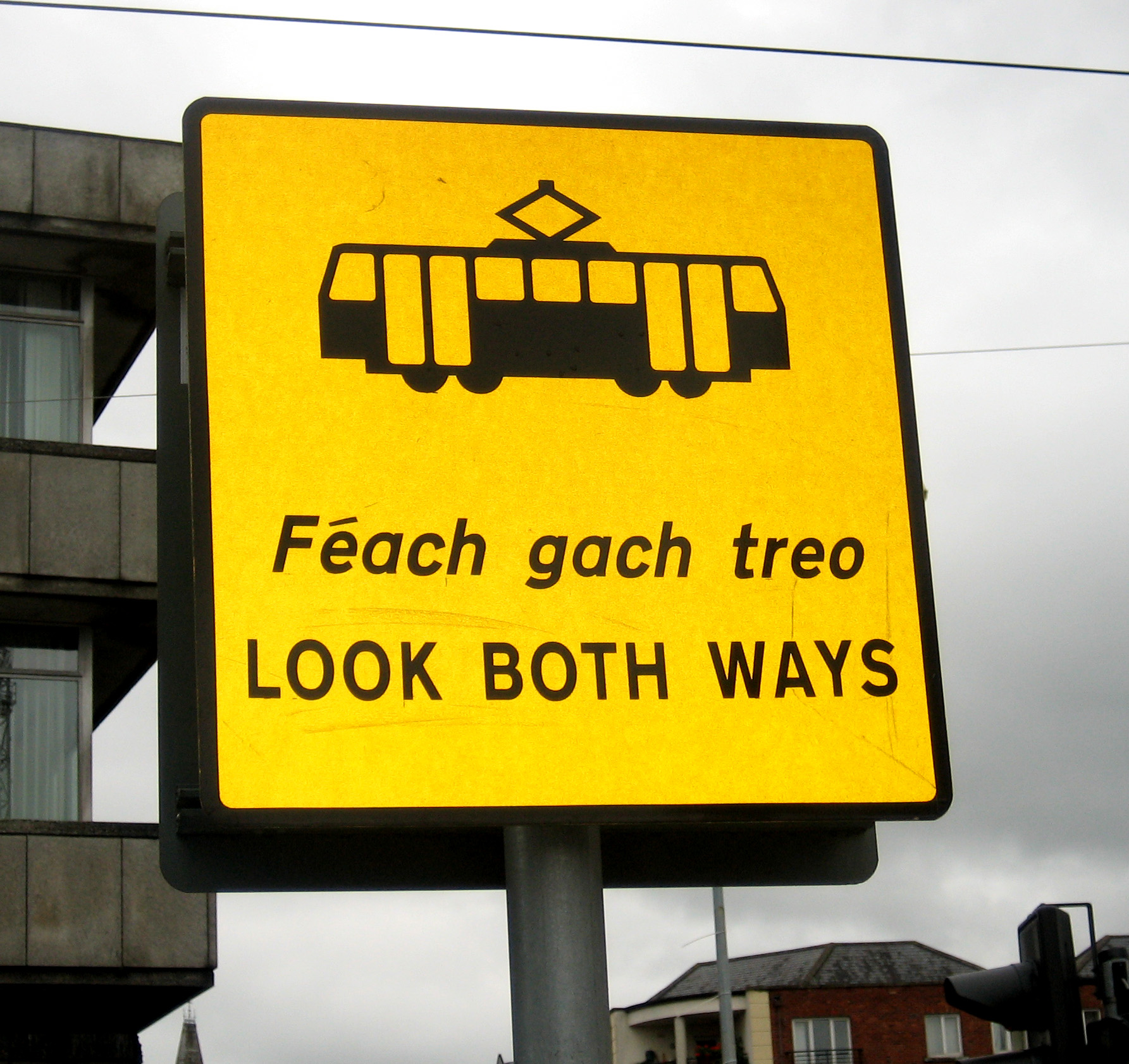
Bilingual sign in the Republic of Ireland in Irish (italics) and English (uppercase, roman letters)

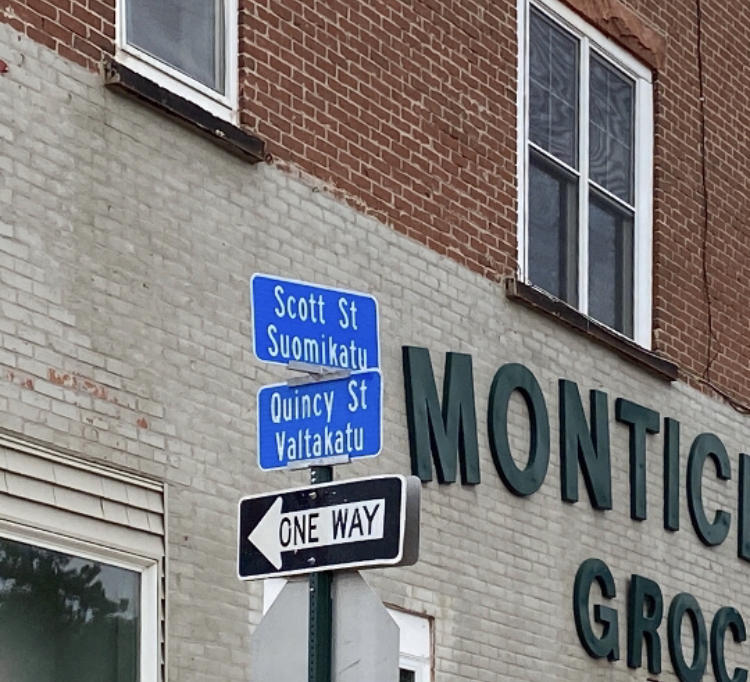
Bilingual signs in English and Finnish in Hancock, Michigan

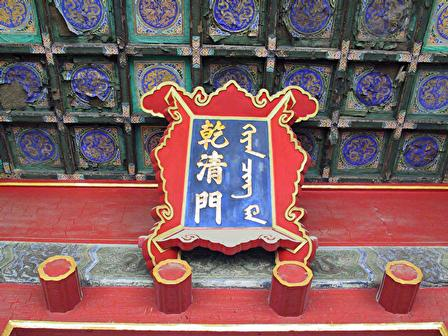
Bilingual sign (Chinese, left; and Manchu, right) in the Forbidden City, China

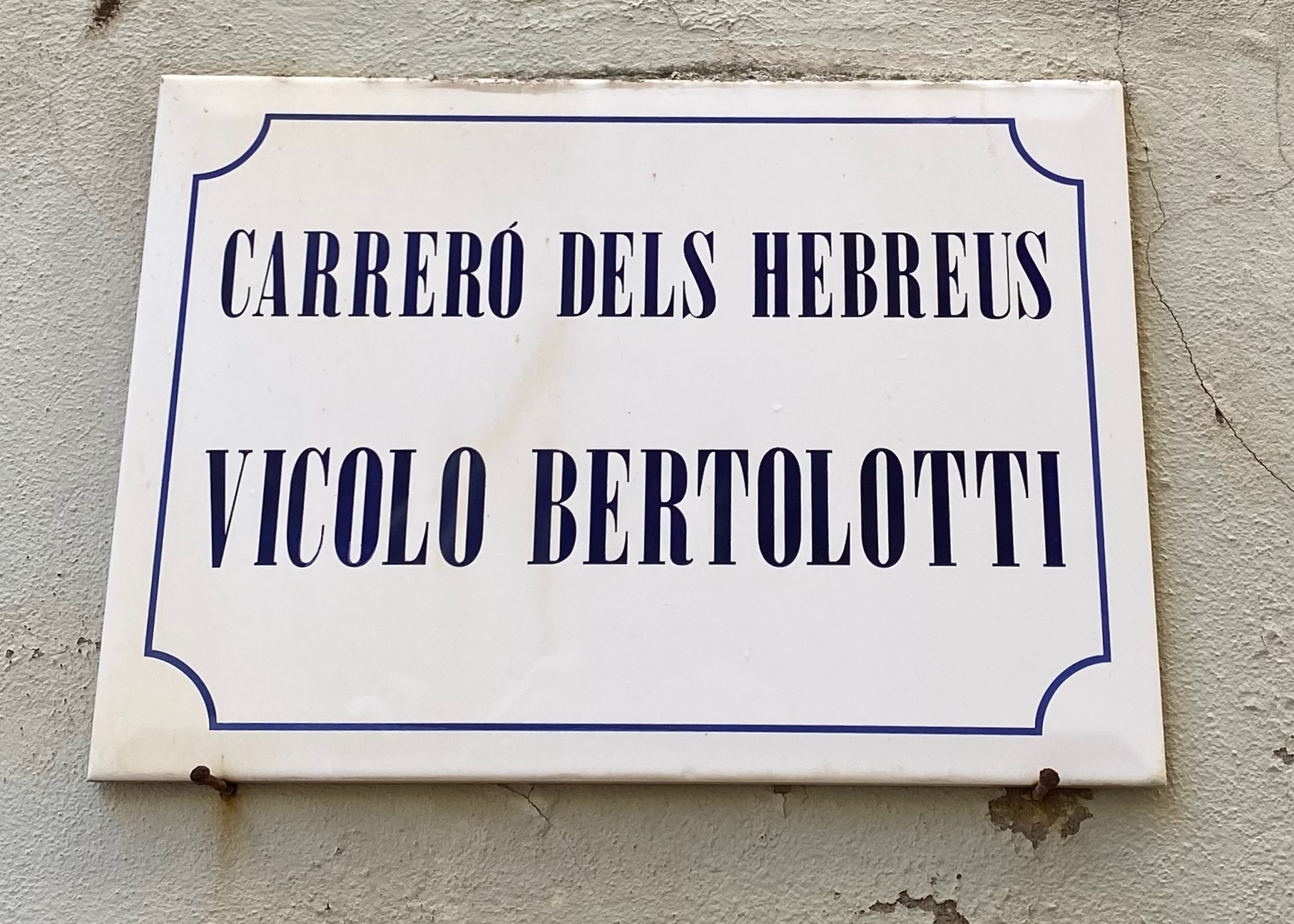
A street sign on the old town of Alghero, in Italian and the local Algherese dialect of Catalan

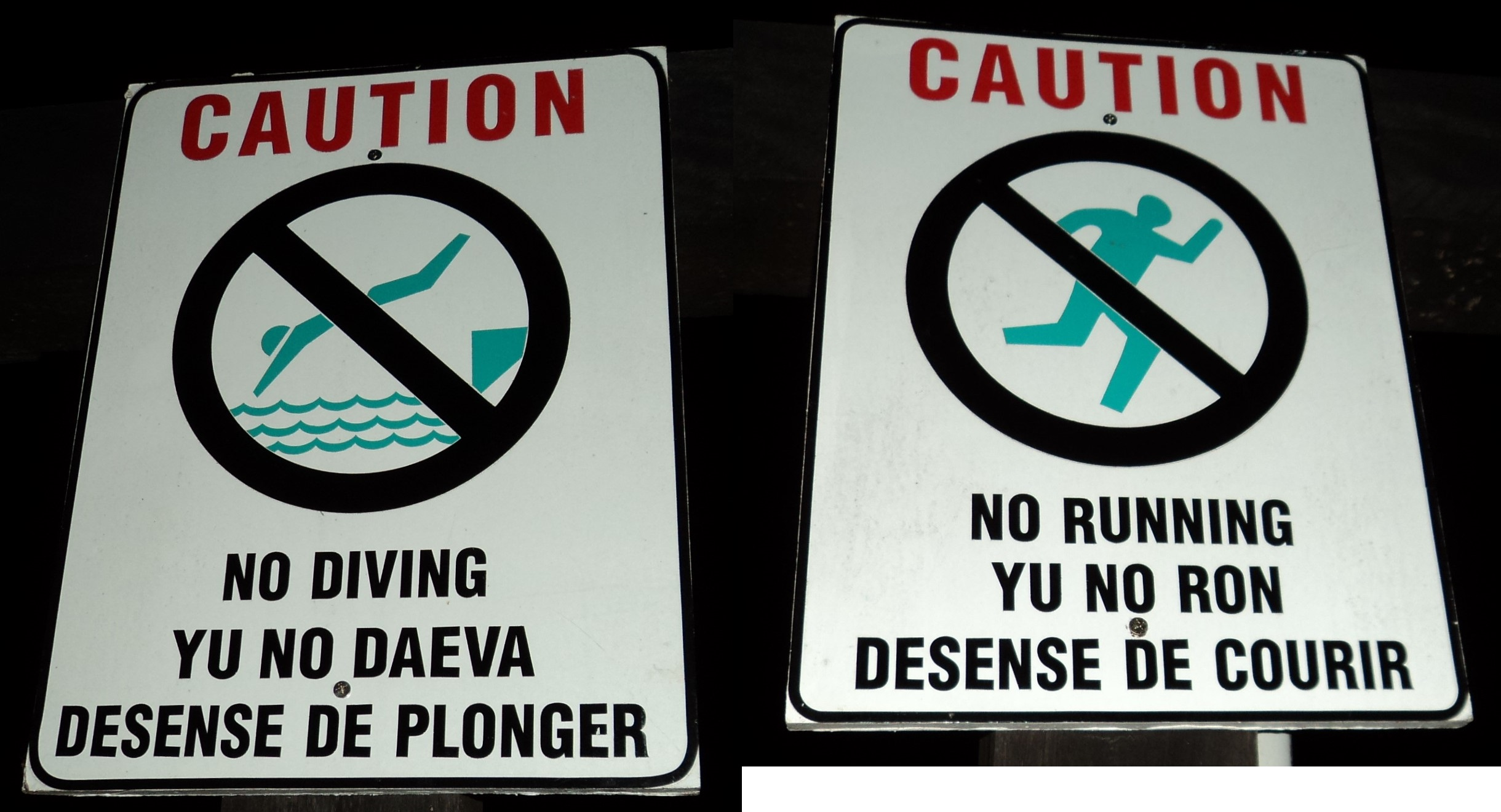
Signs in English, French and Bislama in Vanuatu

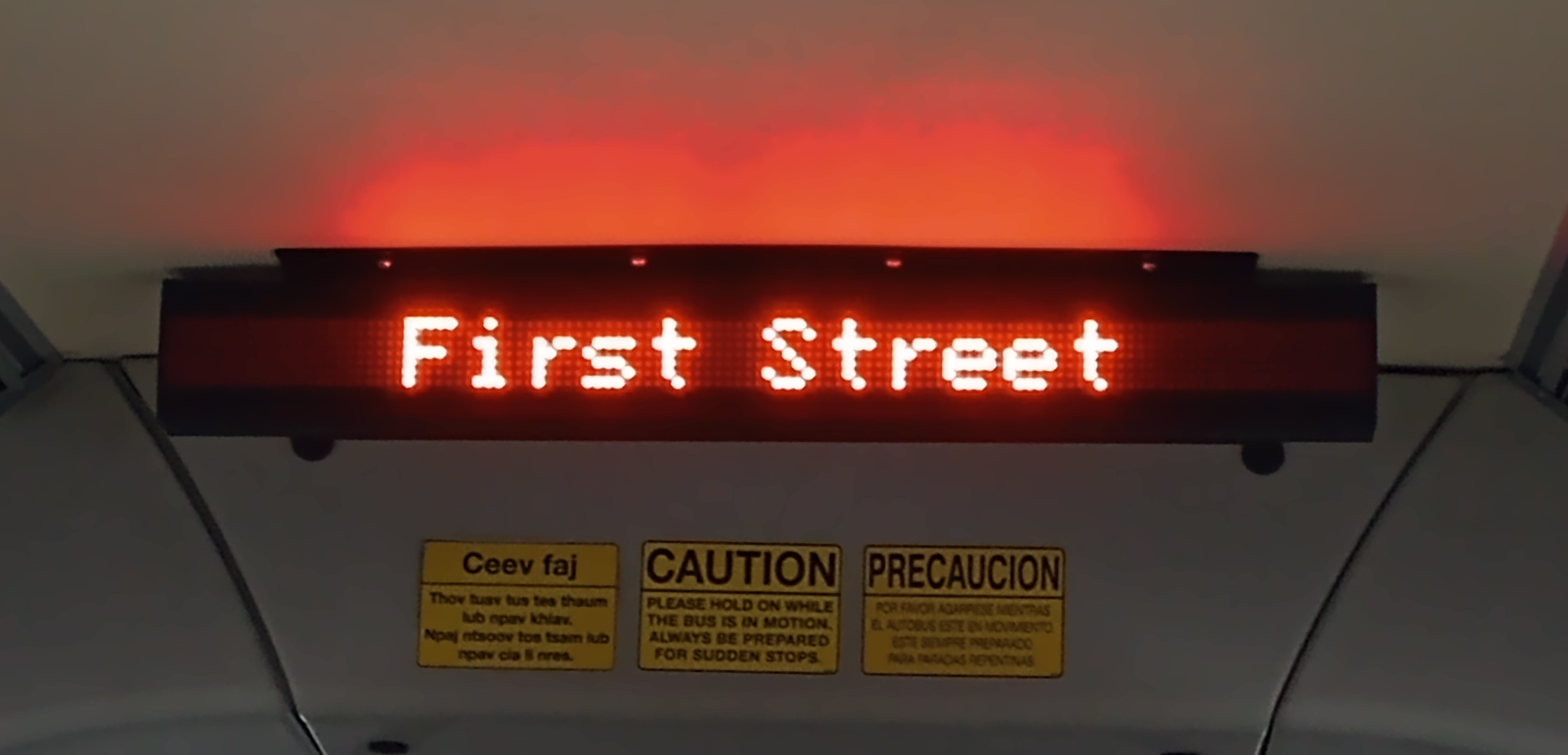
Trilingual bus signage in Madison, Wisconsin, U.S., in Hmong, English and Spanish

== See also ==
- Bilingualism in Canada
- Gaelic road signs in Scotland
- Linguistic landscape
- List of multilingual countries and regions
- Road signs in the Republic of Ireland
- Rules of the road

== Bibliography ==
- Francescato, G. Le aree bilingui e le regioni di confine. Angeli
- Baldacci, O. Geografia e toponomastica. S.G.I.
- Baines, Phil. Dixon, Catherin. Signs. UK: Laurence King Co., 2004 (trad.ital. Segnali: grafica urbana e territoriale. Modena: Logos, 2004)
- Boudreau, A. Dubois, L. Bulot, T. Ledegen, G. Signalétiques et signalisations linguistiques et langagières des espaces de ville (configurations et enjeux sociolinguistiques). Revue de l'Université de Moncton Vol. 36 n.1. Moncton (Nouveau-Brunswick, Canada): Université de Moncton, 2005.
- Bhatia, Tej K. Ritchie, William C. Handbook of Bilingualism. Oxford: Blackwell Publishing, 2006.
- Shohamy, E. & Gorter, D. (Eds.), Linguistic Landscape: Expanding the Scenery. London: Routledge, 2009.
- Shohamy, E., Ben-Rafael, E., & Barni, M. (Eds.) Linguistic Landscape and the City. Bristol: Multilingual Matters, 2010.
