= Stolemberg =

Mountain in Italy

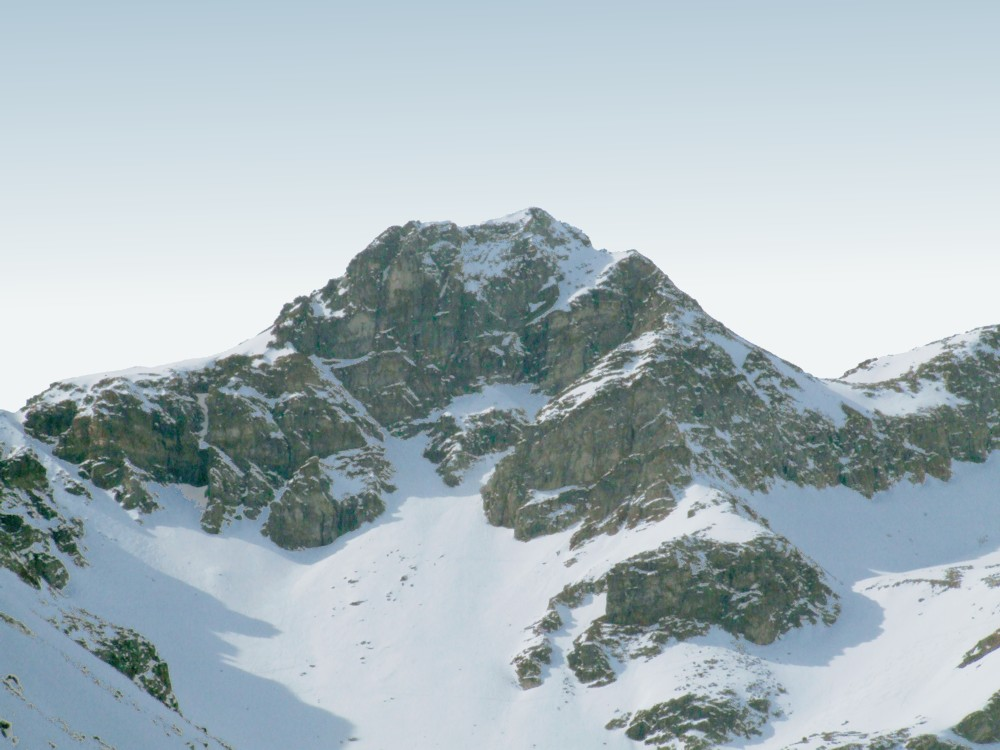
- Stolemberg seen from the north

Highest point
- Elevation: 3,202 m (10,505 ft)
- Prominence: 57 m (187 ft)
- Isolation: 0.69 km (0.43 mi)

Geography
- Location: Piedmont and Aosta Valley, Italy
- Parent range: Pennine Alps

The Stolemberg is a mountain of the Pennine Alps, in northwestern Italy, with an elevation of 3,202 metres (10,505 ft).

Part of the Monte Rosa massif, it is located on the border between the municipalities of Alagna Valsesia, Piedmont, and Gressoney-La-Trinité, Aosta Valley, on the drainage divide between the Lys Valley and the Valsesia. The Passo dei Salati, to its south, divides it from the Corno del Camoscio. A gold mine was active at its base during the 18th and 19th centuries.

The peak can be reached with a scramble from the Passo dei Salati.
