= Punta Straling =

Mountain in Italy

- Walser: Stralingspétz
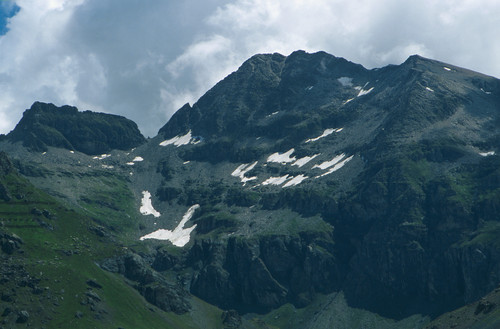
- Punta Straling seen from the Gressoney side

Highest point
- Elevation: 3,115 m (10,220 ft)
- Prominence: 240 m (790 ft)

Geography
- Location: Piedmont and Aosta Valley, Italy
- Parent range: Pennine Alps

The Punta Straling (Walser: Stralingspétz) is a mountain of the Pennine Alps, in northwestern Italy, with an elevation of 3,115 metres (10,220 ft).

Part of the Monte Rosa massif, it is located on the border between the municipalities of Alagna Valsesia, Piedmont, and Gressoney-La-Trinité, Aosta Valley, on the drainage divide between the Lys Valley and the Valsesia. The Zube Pass, to its north, divides it from the Corno Rosso; the Coppa Pass, to its south, divides it from the Corno Grosso.

The peak can be reached with a scramble from both passes.
