= Gresson =

Gresson is a surname. Notable people with the surname include:

- Francis Gresson (1868–1949), English cricketer active from 1887 to 1901
- Henry Barnes Gresson (1809–1901), New Zealand judge
- Kenneth Gresson, KBE (1891–1974), New Zealand soldier, lawyer, university lecturer and judge
- William Jardine Gresson (1869–1934), British merchant and politician in Hong Kong and China

== See also ==
- Gresson Street (機利臣街), a street in the Wan Chai area of Hong Kong Island, Hong Kong
- Gress
- Gresso
- Gressoney (disambiguation)
