= Gressoney, Aosta Valley =

Former commune of Aosta Valley in north-west Italy

Coordinates: 45°47′N 7°49′E

Gressoney (French: [ɡʁɛsɔnɛ], Walser: Greschòney) was a commune of Aosta Valley in north-west Italy. It was created in 1928 by the union of the two existing communes of Gressoney-La-Trinité and Gressoney-Saint-Jean. Between 1939 and 1946 its official name was Italianized as Gressonei, after which the commune was suppressed and the two former municipalities reconstituted.
