= Lys (Dora Baltea) =

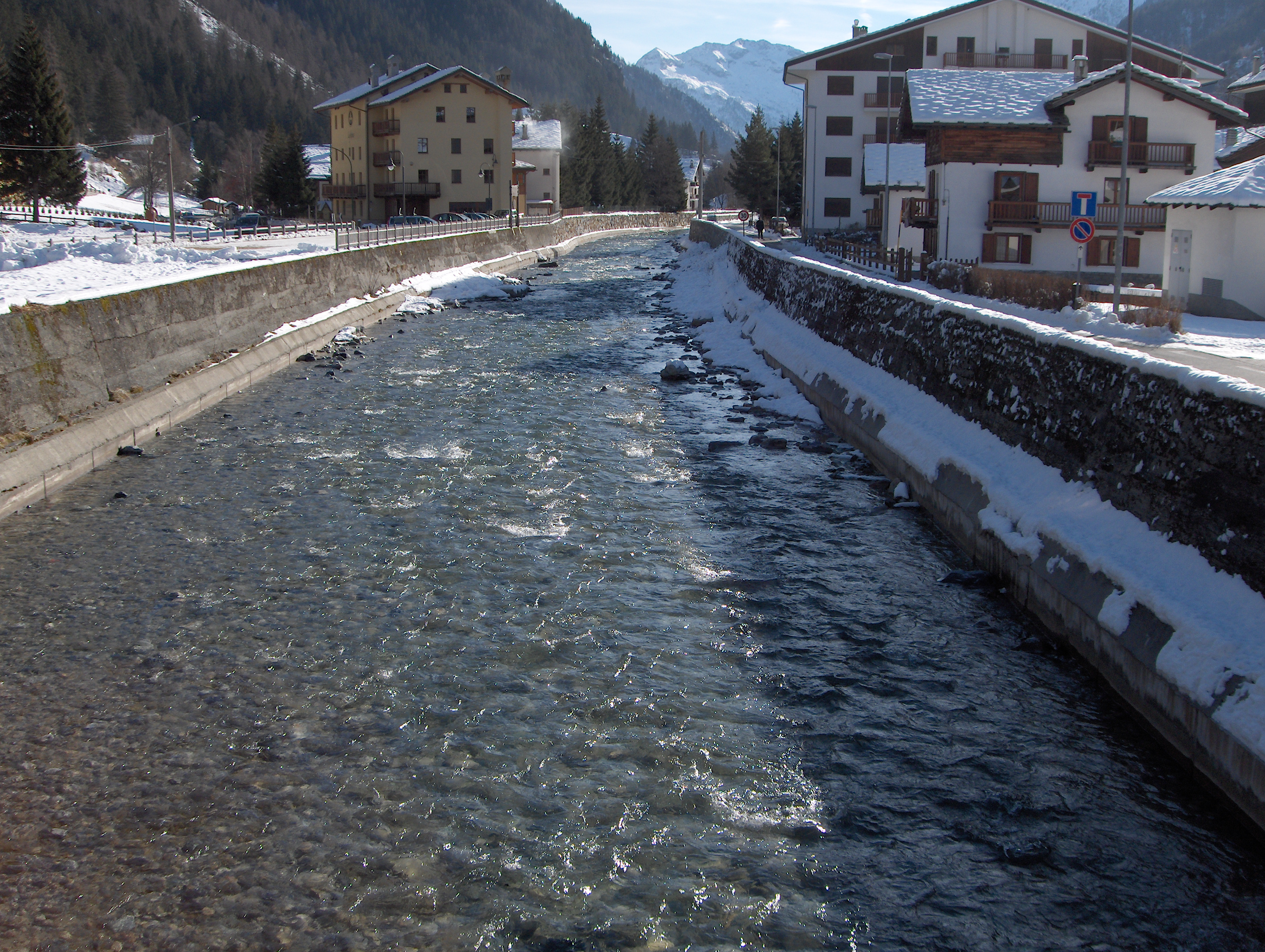
- The Lys at Gressoney-Saint-Jean

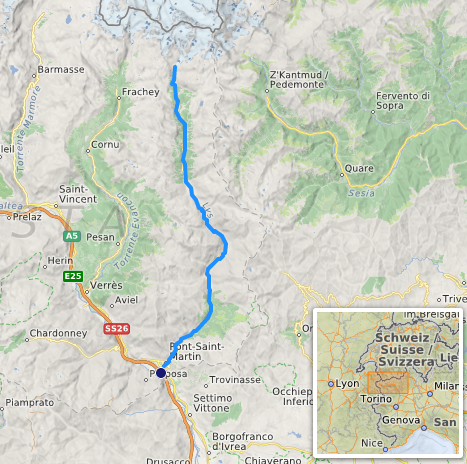

Location
- Country: Italy

Physical characteristics
- Source
  - location: Monte Rosa
  - coordinates: 45°53′00″N 7°48′40″E
  - elevation: 2,500 m (8,200 ft)
- Mouth: Dora Baltea
  - coordinates: 45.5900°N 7.7925°E
- Length: 40 km (25 mi)

Basin features
- Progression: Dora Baltea→ Po→ Adriatic Sea

The Lys (Walser German: Liisu or Lyesu) is a small 40 kilometres (25 mi) river (classified as a torrente).

== Geography ==
The Lys River originates from the Lys Glacier, located on the southern side of the Monte Rosa massif, at the foot of Vincent Pyramid (elevation: 4,215 metres / 13,829 ft). It flows through the Lys Valley, which is flanked by a road and passes through the following municipalities:

- Gressoney-La-Trinité
- Gressoney-Saint-Jean
- Gaby
- Issime
- Fontainemore
- Lillianes
- Perloz

The Lys converges with the Dora Baltea (French: Doire baltée) as a right-bank tributary at Pont-Saint-Martin.

Its left-side tributaries include: the Avant-Cir, Glassit, Loo, Mos, Niel, Pacoulla, and Tourrison. From the right, it receives: the Rû de Nantay, Stolen, and Valbona.

The river is classified as a torrente, meaning a fast-flowing mountain stream typical of the Alps.

== Gallery ==
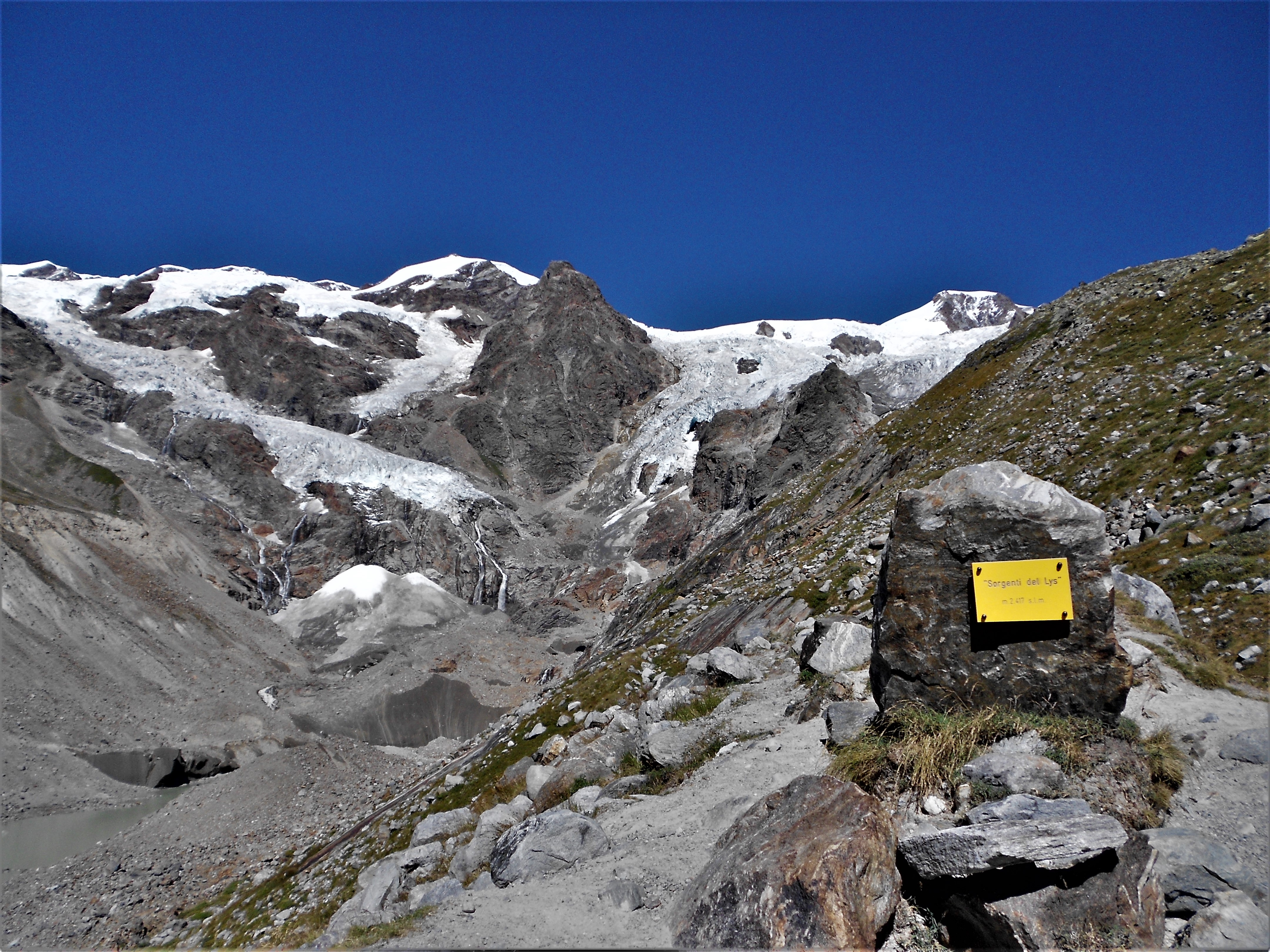
The sources of the Lys at the Lys glacier in the Monte Rosa mountain massif, below the Vincent Pyramid and close to the giant Lyskamm (4.533 m)

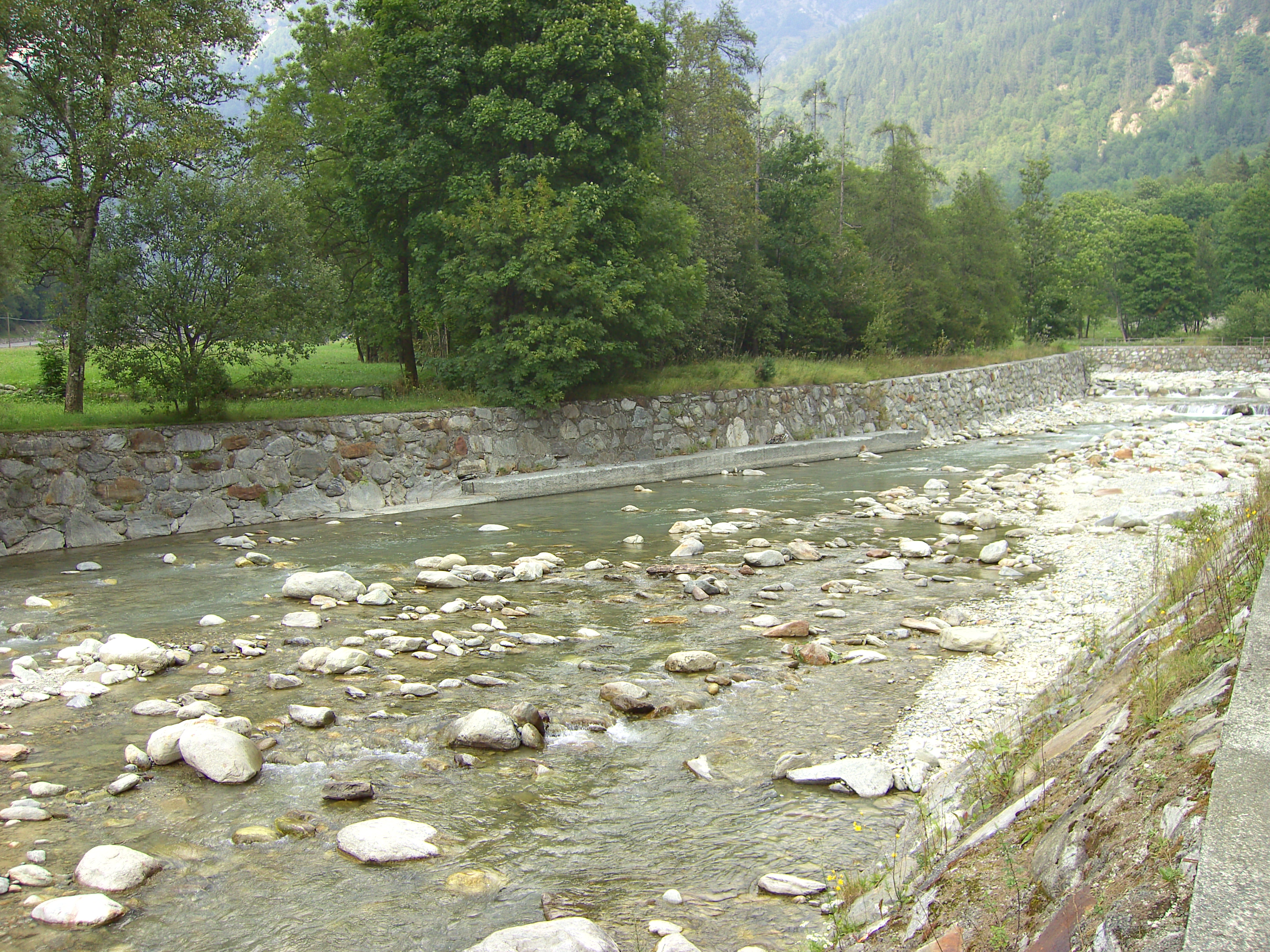
The river close to Gaby

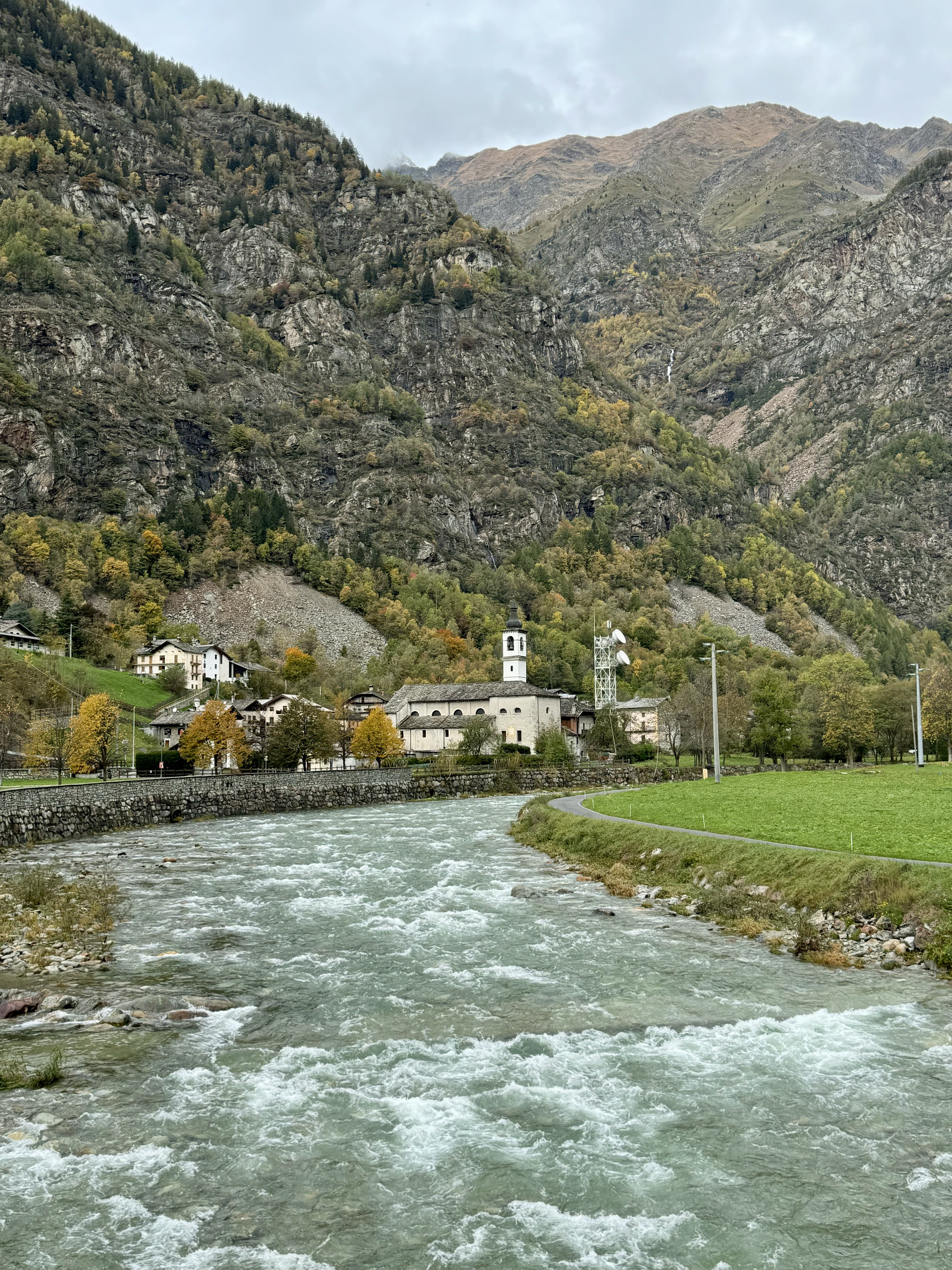
The river close to Issime

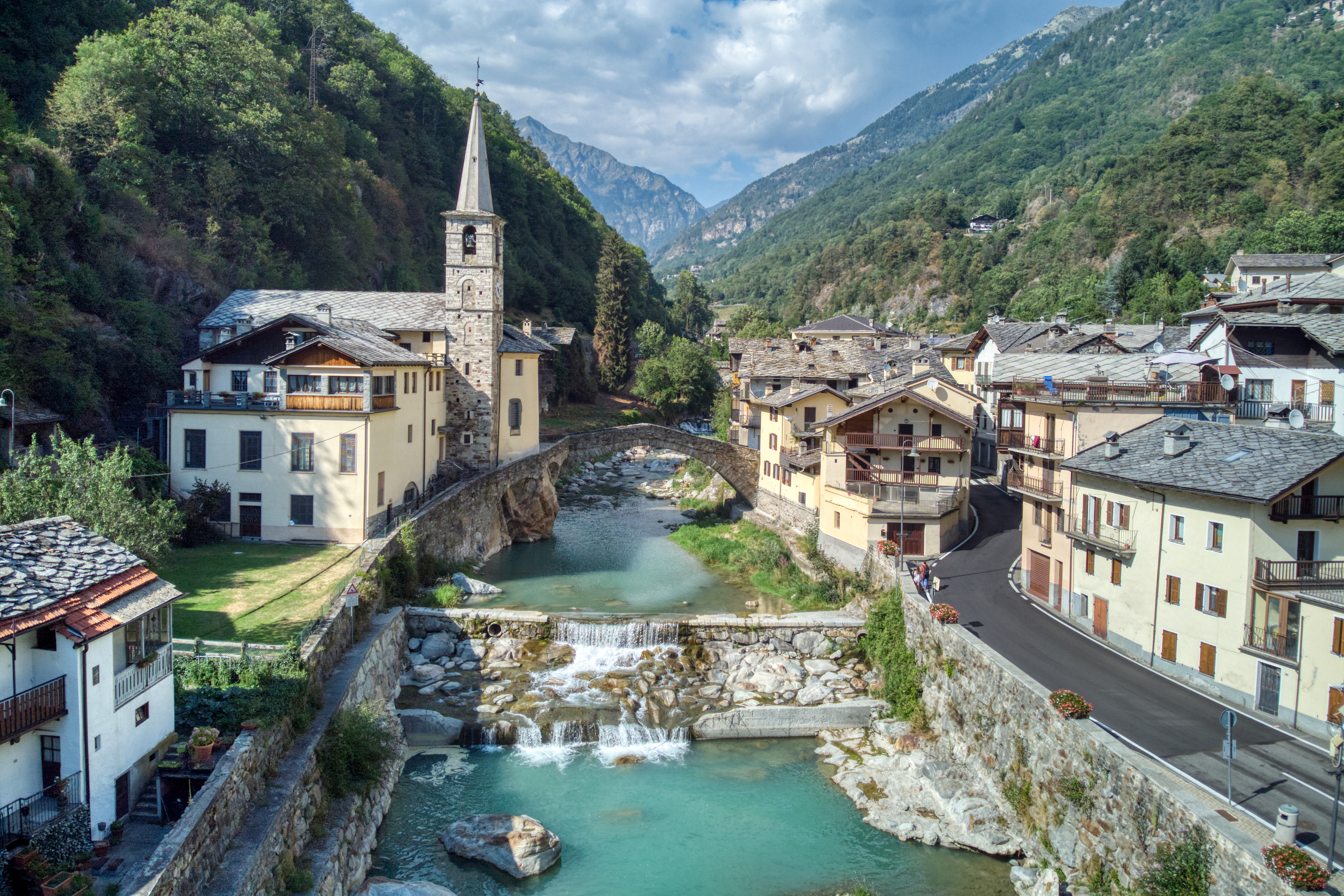
In Fontainemore

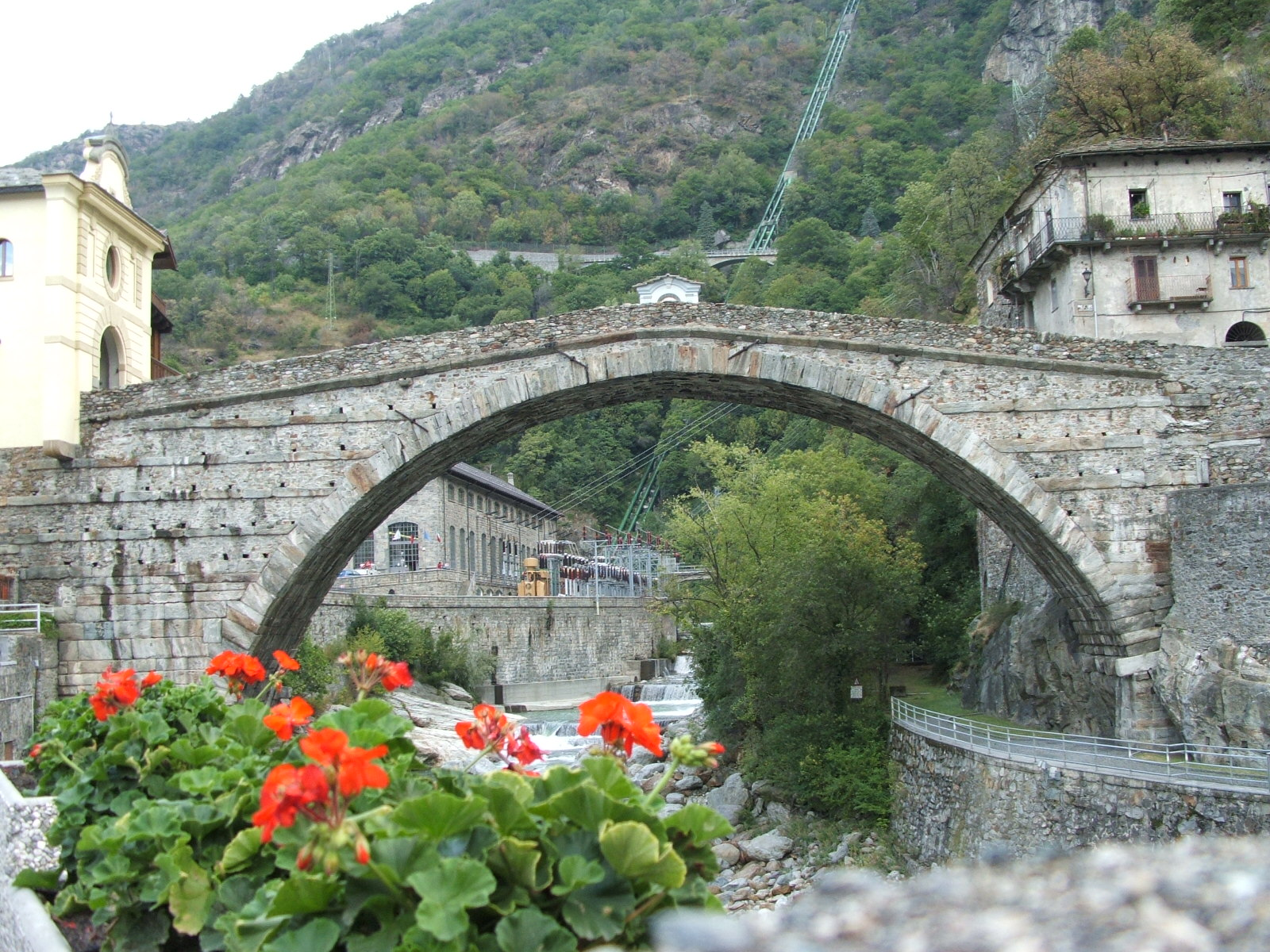
The Pont Saint-Martin

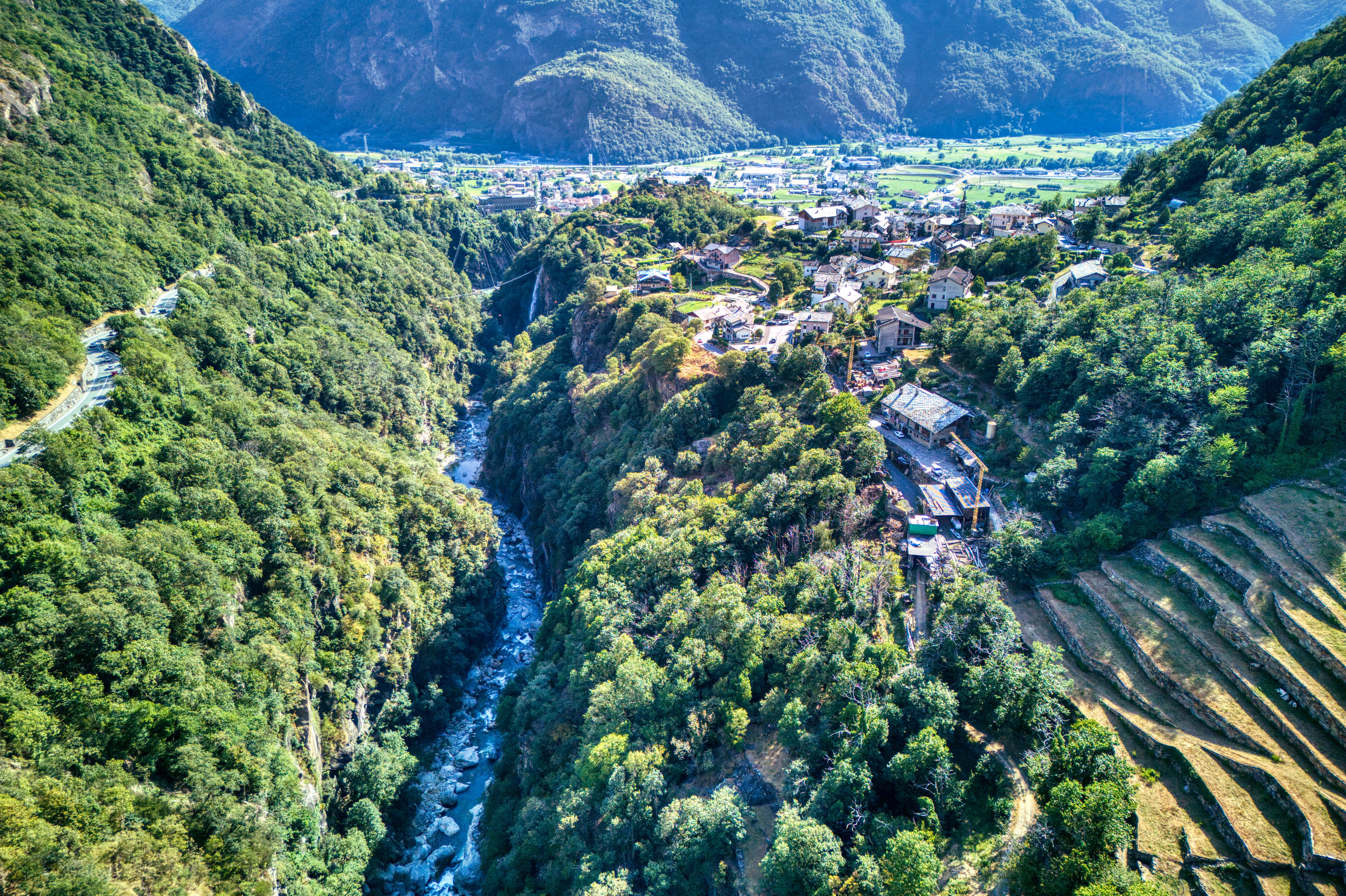
The river Lys in the Perloz municipality
