= Lys Valley =

Coordinates: 45.750000°N 7.833333°E

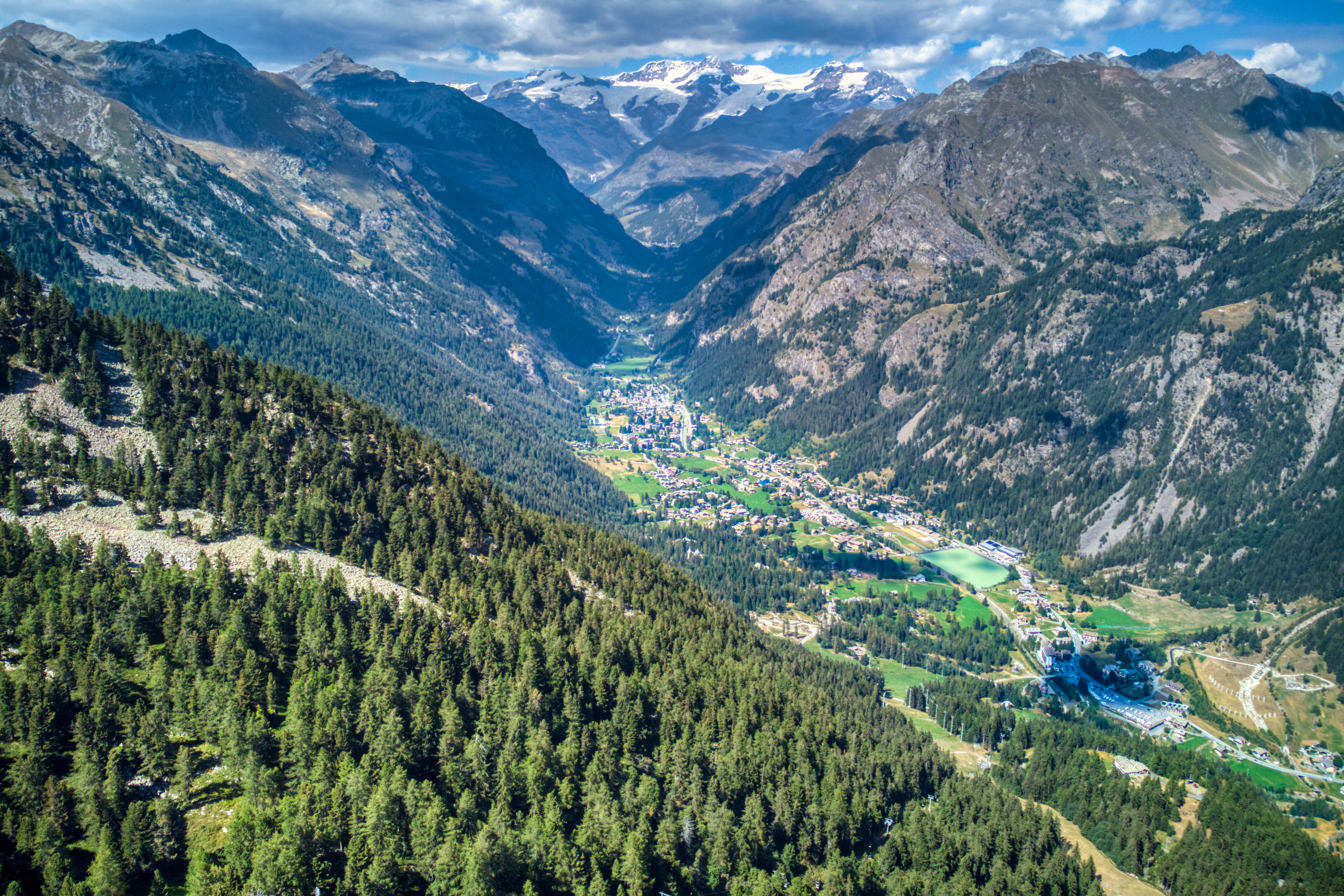
The Lys Valley with Monte Rosa

The Lys Valley (Italian: Valle del Lys, French: Vallée du Lys, German: Lystal, titsch: Walleschu, töitschu: Walludu), also known as the Gressoney Valley (Italian: Valle di Gressoney, French: Vallée de Gressoney) is a side valley of the Aosta Valley in northern Italy.

== Geography ==
The valley lies on the left orographic side of the Dora Baltea, the main river of the Aosta Valley. It is drained by the Lys stream, which rises from the Lys Glacier on the southern slopes of the Monte Rosa massif at the head of the valley and flows down north to south to join the Dora Baltea river near Pont-Saint-Martin.

It borders the Valais canton of Switzerland to the north, the Ayas Valley to the west, the lower Dora Baltea valley to the south-east, and the Italian provinces of Biella and Vercelli (Piedmont) to the south and east.

The valley extends for approximately 38 km (24 mi), stretching from Pont-Saint-Martin, at the confluence of the Lys and the Dora Baltea, to the village of Staffal in the upper valley, beneath the Monte Rosa massif. The valley reaches its highest points at the summit of Eastern Lyskamm (4,527 m), on the watershed between Italy and Switzerland. Other important summits include Western Lyskamm (4,481 m) and Ludwigshöhe (4,342 m), also on the watershed with Switzerland, and Vincent Pyramid (4,215 m), on the watershed with Piedmont.

At its head, the valley is covered by the Lys Glacier, one of the largest glaciers on the southern side of the Alps, which descends from the Colle del Lys (4,248 m) to an elevation of approximately 2,600 m.

Administratively, the valley comprises eight comuni, listed from south to north: Pont-Saint-Martin, Perloz, Lillianes, Fontainemore, Issime, Gaby, Gressoney-Saint-Jean, and Gressoney-La-Trinité.

== Walser heritage ==
The upper Lys Valley is one of the historic settlement areas of the Walser people, a German-speaking Alpine population that migrated across the high passes of the Monte Rosa during the 13th century. Walser communities were established in the villages of Gressoney-Saint-Jean, Gressoney-La-Trinité and Issime. Their Walser German dialect has survived locally in two distinct varieties: Titsch, spoken in the two Gressoney villages, and Töitschu, spoken in Issime. The valley is known as Walleschu in Titsch and Walludu in Töitschu.
