= Gressoney-La-Trinité =

Gressoney-La-Trinité Gressonèy-La-Trinità (Arpitan) Greschòney Drifaltigkeit/Greschòney Oberteil (Walser)
- Comune
- Comune di Gressoney-La-Trinité; Commune de Gressoney-La-Trinité; Gemeinde Gressoney-La-Trinité
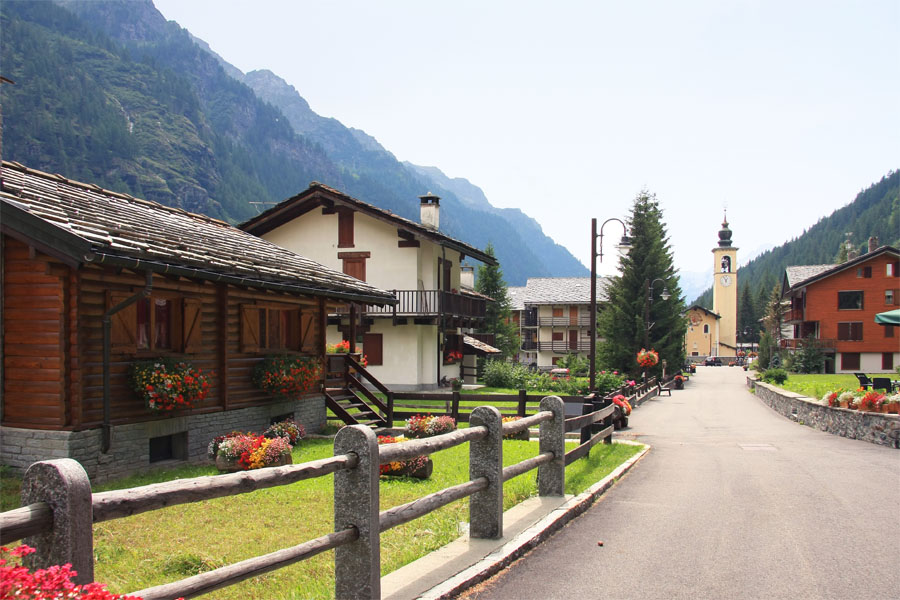
- View of Tache

- Coat of arms

- Location within Italy Location within Aosta Valley
- Coordinates: 45°50′N 07°50′E
- Country: Italy
- Region: Aosta Valley
- Frazioni: Anderbät, Bédémie, Biel, Collete Sann, Ejò, Engé, Fòhré, Gabiet, Gòver, Héché, Montery, Nétschò, Òber Bät, Òbre Eselbode, Òbrò Dejelò, Ònder Bät, Ònderemwoald, Òndre Eselbode, Òndro Dejolò, Òrsio, Rèfetsch, Sannmatto, Selbsteg, Stafal, Stéde, Stòtz, Tache, Tòlo, Tschaval, Tschòbésch-hus, Tschòcke, Wòaldielé

Area
  - Total: 65 km^{2} (25 sq mi)
- Elevation: 1,635 m (5,364 ft)

Population (31 December 2022)
  - Total: 322
  - Density: 5.0/km^{2} (13/sq mi)
- Demonym: Gressonards
- Time zone: UTC+1 (CET)
  - Summer (DST): UTC+2 (CEST)
- Postal code: 11020
- Dialing code: 0125
- Website: Official website

Gressoney-La-Trinité (French: [ɡʁɛsɔnɛj la tʁinite]; Gressoney Walser: Greschòney Drifaltigkeit or Greschòney Oberteil; Arpitan: Gressonèy-La-Trinità) is a town or commune and renowned alpine resort at the foot of Monte Rosa in the Lys Valley, which is part of the Aosta Valley region of Northwest Italy.

== Geography ==
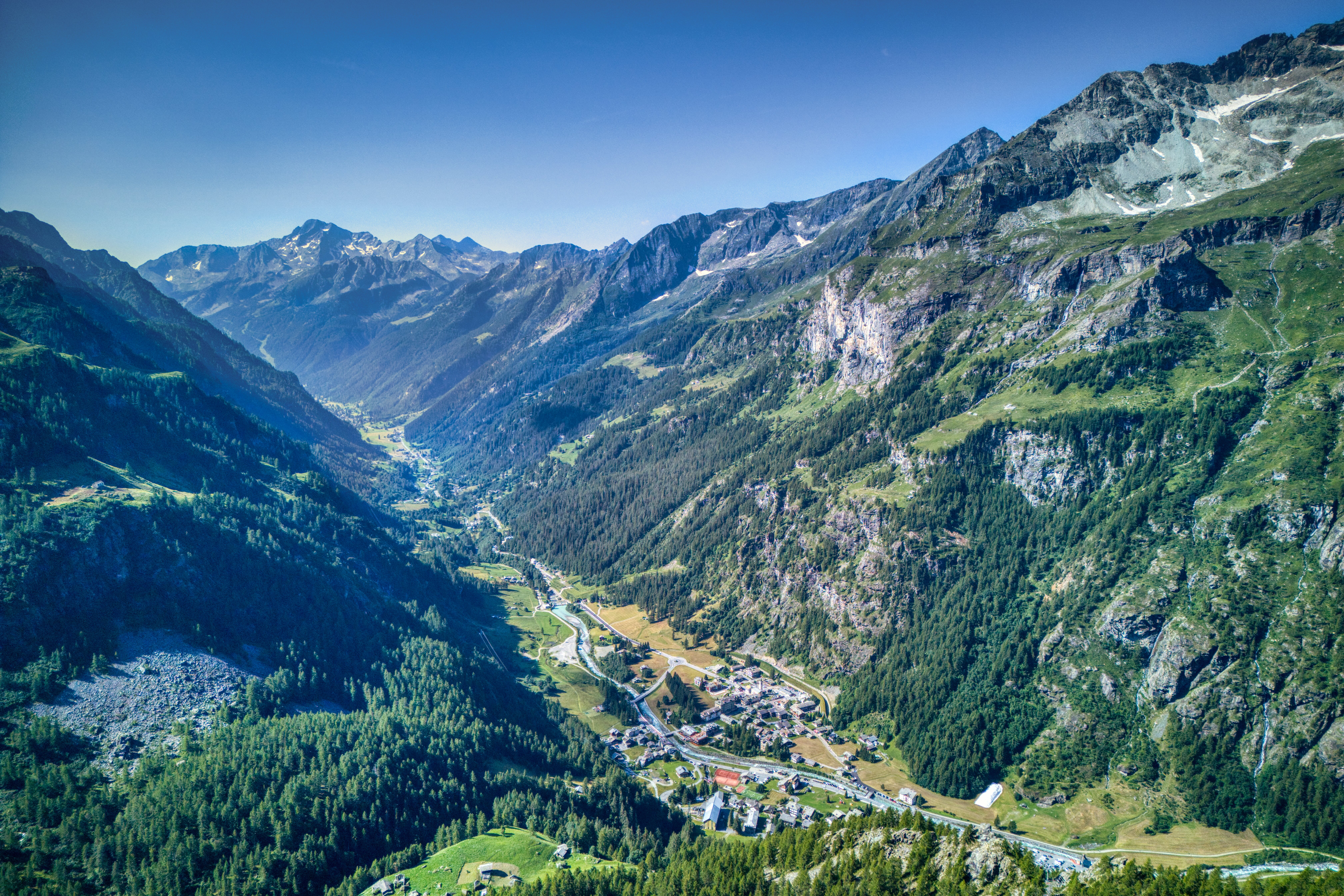
The upper Lys Valley.

Gressoney-La-Trinité is located at 1,627 metres (5,338 ft) above sea level, it has the highest elevation of any inhabited place in the Lys Valley.

== History ==
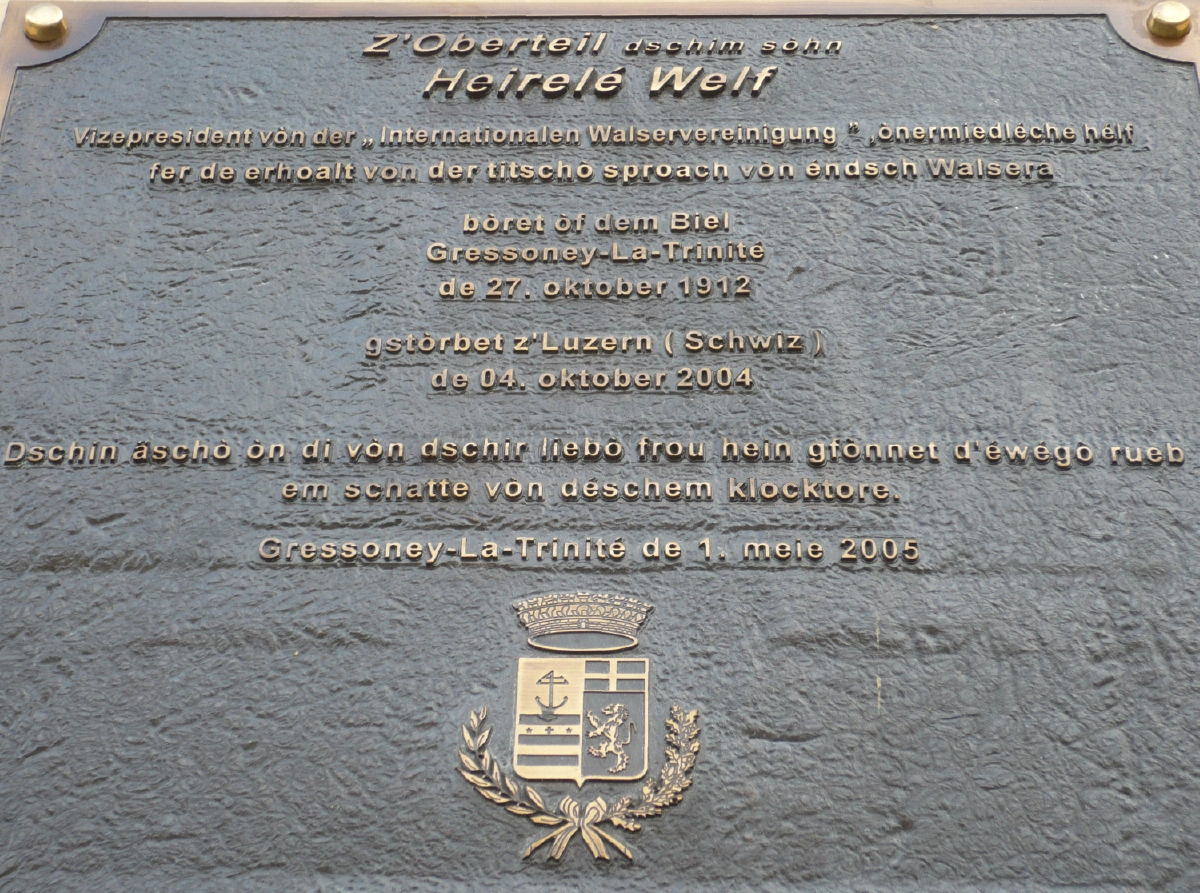
Inscription in Walser German dedicated to Henrich Welf, a native of Gressoney-La-Trinité, president of the Walser Kulturzentrum.

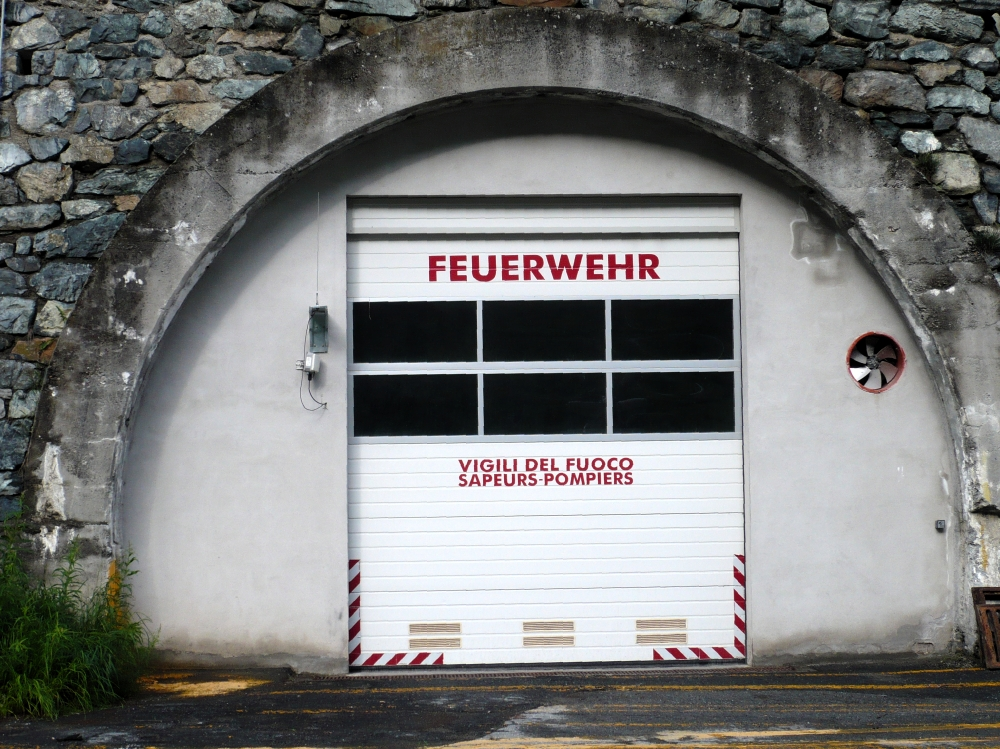
Garage door of the local fire service in La-Trinité. The door is specified in the three official languages: German, Italian and French.

Walser people settled in the upper Lys Valley from the 12th century onwards. Historically, Gressoney-Saint-Jean and Gressoney-La-Trinité have been two separate communes.

From 1928 until 1946, the two communes were unified and officially named Gressoney. From 1939 to 1946, the name was Italianized into Gressonei. After WWII the two former communes were again reconstituted separately.

== Walser culture and language ==
Gressoney-La-Trinité and Gressoney-Saint-Jean form a Walser German linguistic and cultural entity known as Kressenau or Kreschnau in German, or Greschòney in the local Walser dialect known as Greschoneytitsch (or simply Titsch).

An example of Greschòneytitsch:

Walser German (Greschoneytitsch)	German	English
Endsche Attò das béscht em Hémmel, dass héilege sígge Dín Noame. Chéeme Dín Herrschaft.	Vater unser der Du bist im Himmel, geheiligt werde Dein Name. Dein Reich komme.	Our Father in heaven, hallowed be your name. Your kingdom come,
