= Villa Margherita =

Villa Margherita may refer to:

== Italy ==
- Villa Margherita, Bordighera
- Villa Margherita, Castagneto Carducci, build 1913 by Counts Ugolino and Giuseppe della Gherardesca
- Villa Margherita, Castellammare del Golfo, historical garden in Castellammare del Golfo
- Villa Margherita, Catanzaro, public garden in Catanzaro
- Villa Margherita, Florence, part of Ospedale Piero Palagi in Florence
- Villa Margherita, Gressoney-Saint-Jean
- Villa Margherita, Lido di Venezia, 1919 building in Venice Lido by Mario Mirko Vucetich
- Villa Margherita, Ragusa, public garden in Ragusa, Sicily
- Villa Margherita, Recoaro Terme, building in Recoaro Terme
- Villa Margherita, Trapani, public garden in Trapani
- Villa Margherita Ricordi, in Cadenabbia
- Villa Manfrin detta Margherita, building in Treviso
- Villa Santa Margherita, building in Ancona

== Switzerland ==
- Villa Margherita, La Chaux-de-Fonds, museum in La Chaux-de-Fonds

== United States ==
- Villa Margherita (Charleston, South Carolina), historic house in Charleston, South Carolina
