= Fontainemore =

Fontainemore Fontènemore/Fountramoura (Valdôtain) Pischu (Walser)
- Comune
- Comune di Fontainemore; Commune de Fontainemore
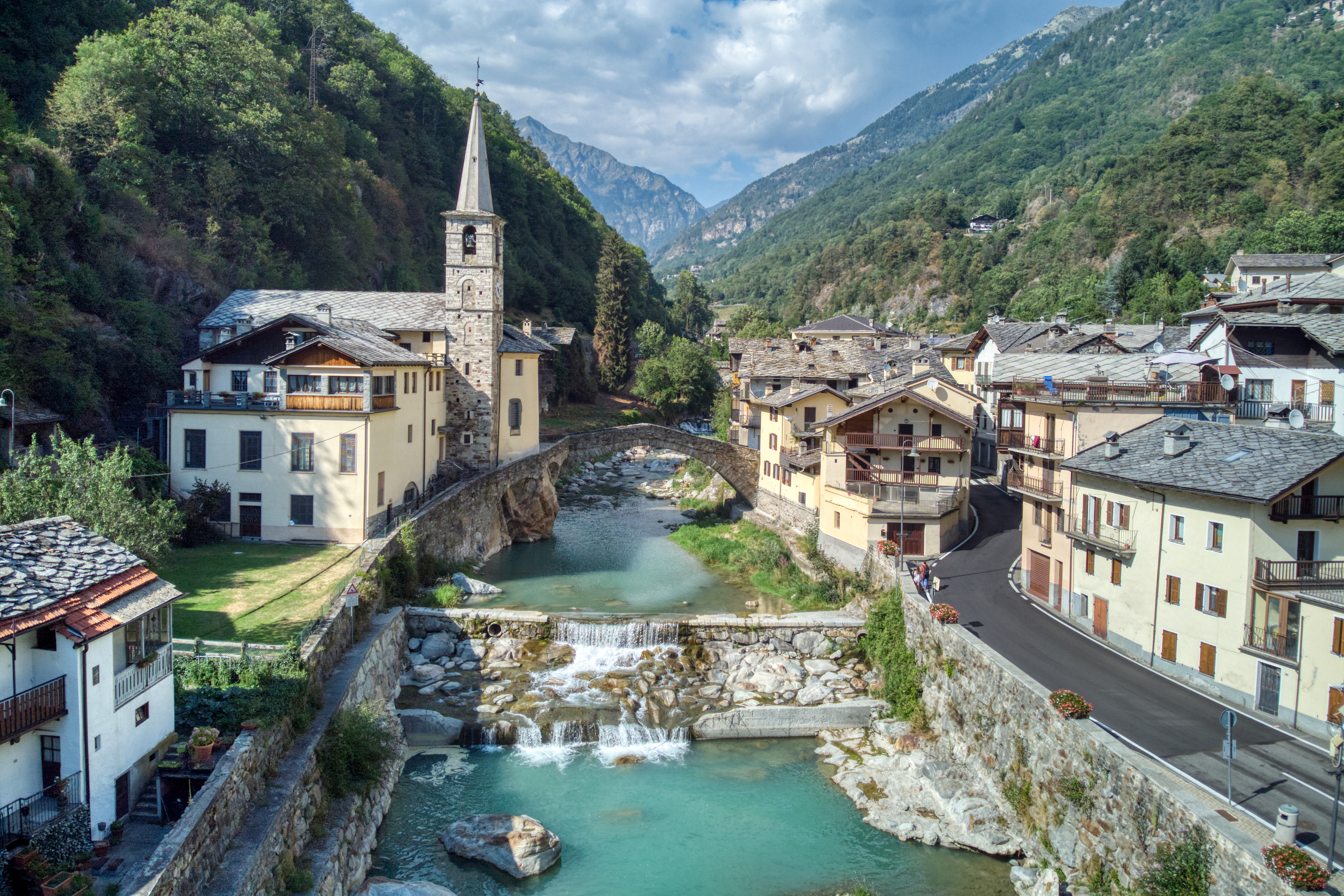

- Coat of arms

- Location within Italy Location within Aosta Valley
- Coordinates: 45°39′N 7°52′E
- Country: Italy
- Region: Aosta Valley
- Province: none
- Frazioni: Barme, Borney, Chuchal, Clapasson, Coré, Espaz, Farettaz, Niana, Pian Pervero, Pillaz, Planaz, Plan Coumarial, Versaz

Area
  - Total: 31 km^{2} (12 sq mi)
- Elevation: 760 m (2,490 ft)

Population (31 December 2022)
  - Total: 418
  - Density: 13/km^{2} (35/sq mi)
- Demonym: Fontainemorains
- Time zone: UTC+1 (CET)
  - Summer (DST): UTC+2 (CEST)
- Postal code: 11020
- Dialing code: 0125

Fontainemore (French: [fɔ̃tɛnmɔʁ]; Valdôtain: Fontènemore or locally Fountramoura; Issime Walser: Pischu) is a town and comune in the Aosta Valley region of north-western Italy. It is one of I Borghi più belli d'Italia ("The most beautiful villages of Italy").

== Toponym ==
The toponym "Fontainemore" may derive from an old fountain called in French as « Fontaine de Saint-Maur » or « Fontaine de la mort ».

Fontainemore was renamed "Fontanamora" in Italian in 1939 during Fascist rule in Italy. It was reverted to its original name in 1946.

== Geography ==
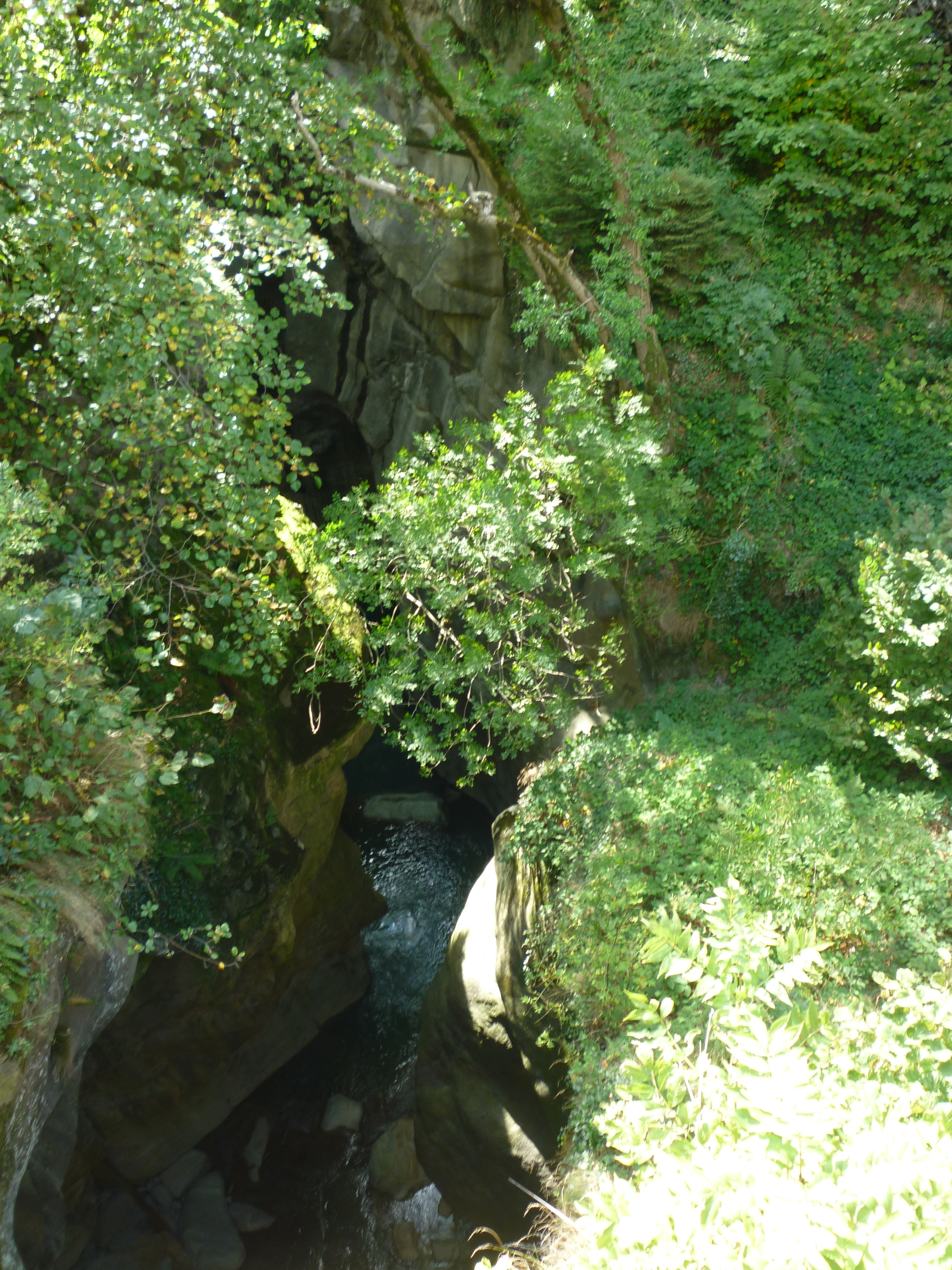
The Gouffre de Guillemore.

Fontainemore is located in the middle of the Lys Valley, near the chasm known as French: Gouffre de Guillemore. It is the most eastern municipality of the Aosta Valley.

== See also ==
- Barma Lake
