= Gressoney-Saint-Jean =

Gressoney-Saint-Jean Greschòney Zer Chilchu (Walser) Gressonèy-Sèn-Dzan (Arpitan)
- Comune
- Comune di Gressoney-Saint-Jean; Commune de Gressoney-Saint-Jean; Gemeinde Gressoney-Saint-Jean
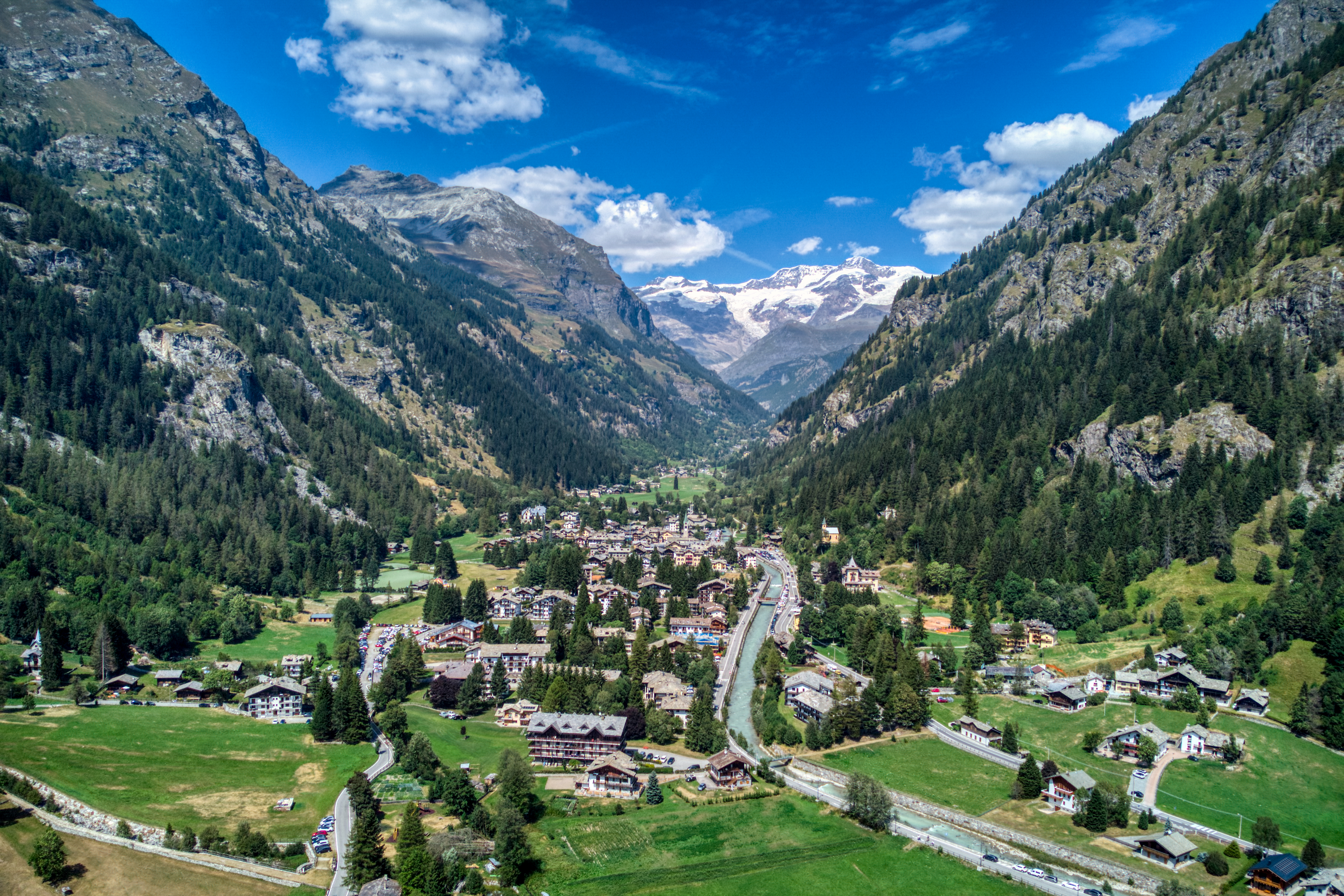

- Coat of arms

- Location within Italy Location within Aosta Valley
- Coordinates: 45°47′N 07°49′E
- Country: Italy
- Region: Aosta Valley
- Frazioni: Bieltschòcke (Bieltschucken), Bode, Chaschtal, Chreffo, Dresal, Loomatto (Loomatten), Méttelteil (Mittelteil), Mettie (Mettien), Noversch, Òbre Biel (Ober Biel), Òbre Champsil (Oberen Champsil), Òbro Verdebio (Oberen Verdebien), Ònderteil (Unterteil), Òndre Biel (Unteren Biel), Òndre Champsil (Unteren Champsil), Òndro Verdebio (Unteren Verdebien), Perletoa, Predeloasch, Stobene, Trentostäg (Trentosbrück), Tschemenoal (Chemonal), Tschoarde, Tschossil, Woald (Wald)

Area
  - Total: 69 km^{2} (27 sq mi)

Population (31 December 2022)
  - Total: 775
  - Density: 11/km^{2} (29/sq mi)
- Time zone: UTC+1 (CET)
  - Summer (DST): UTC+2 (CEST)
- Postal code: 11025
- Dialing code: 0125
- Website: Official website

Gressoney-Saint-Jean (French: [ɡʁɛsɔnɛ sɛ̃ ʒɑ̃]; Gressoney Walser: Greschòney Zer Chilchu; Arpitan: Gressonèy-Sèn-Dzan) is a town and comune in the Aosta Valley region of north-western Italy.

== Geography ==
The town is situated in the Lys Valley and is traversed by the Lys stream.

== History, Walser culture and language ==
Though Gressoney-Saint-Jean and Gressoney-La-Trinité form two separate comunes, they form a Walser German cultural unity known as Greschòney in Greschoneytitsch (or simply Titsch), the local Walser German dialect, or Kressenau in German.

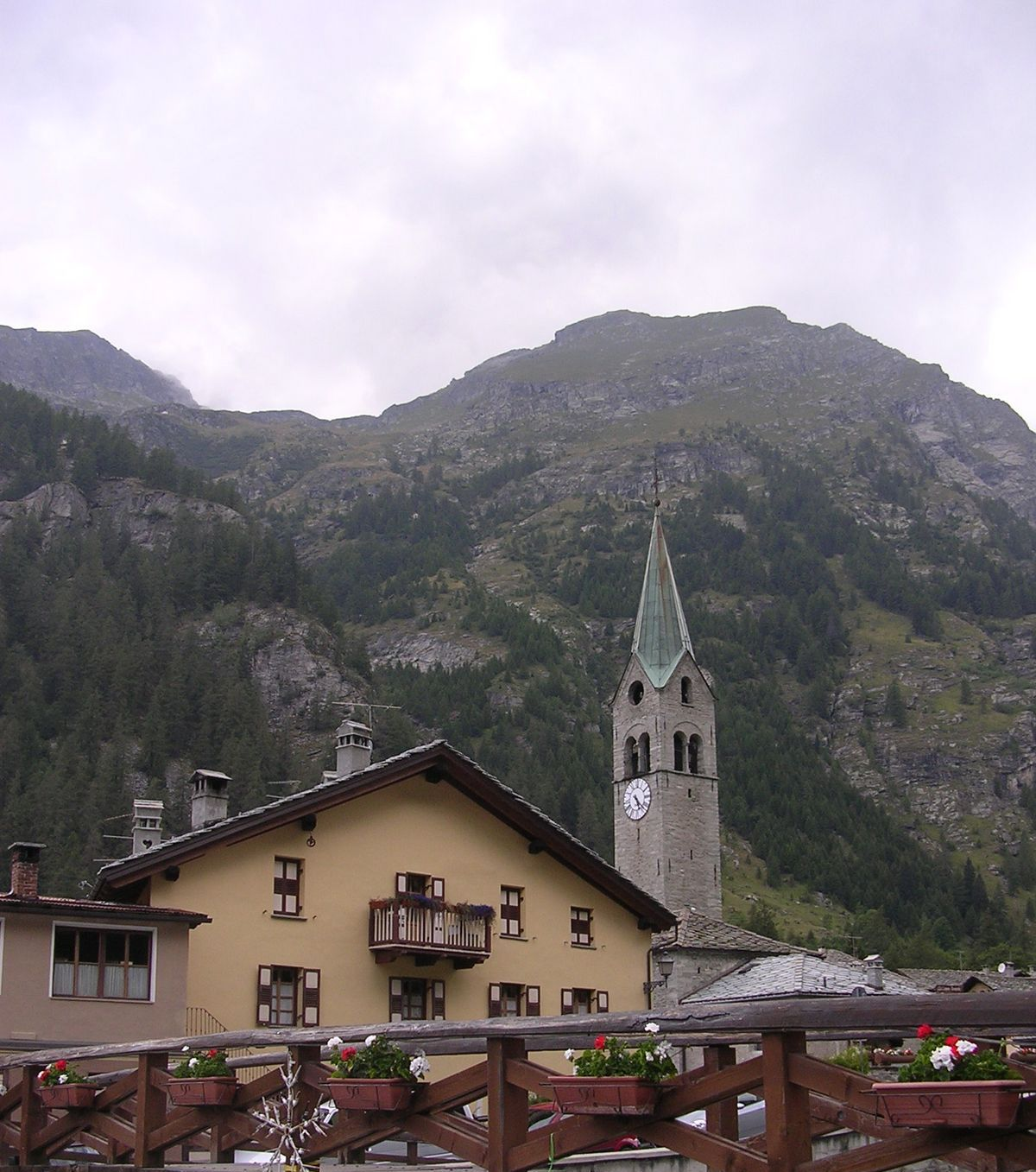
The Church of St John in the Òbre Platz

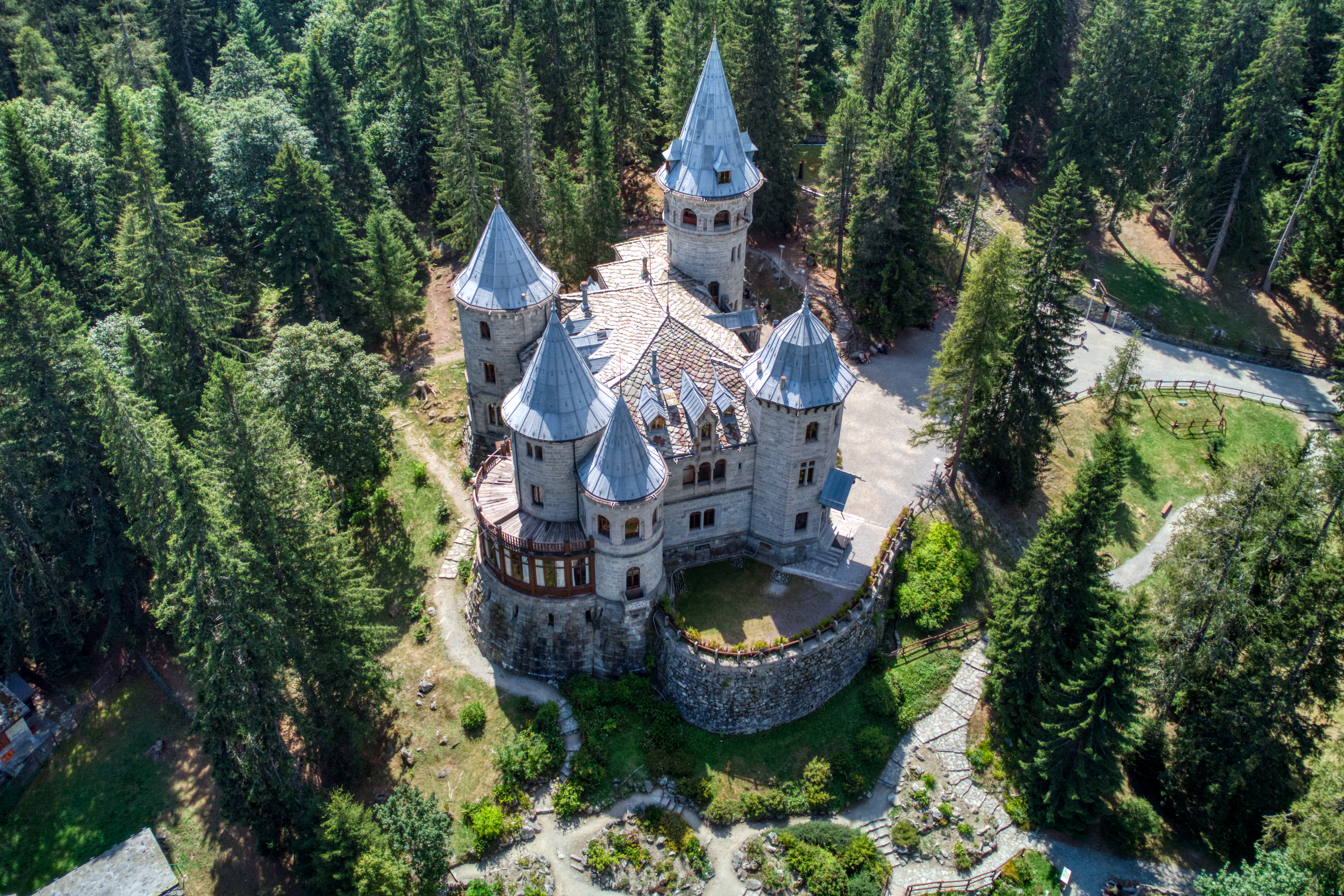
The Savoy Castle

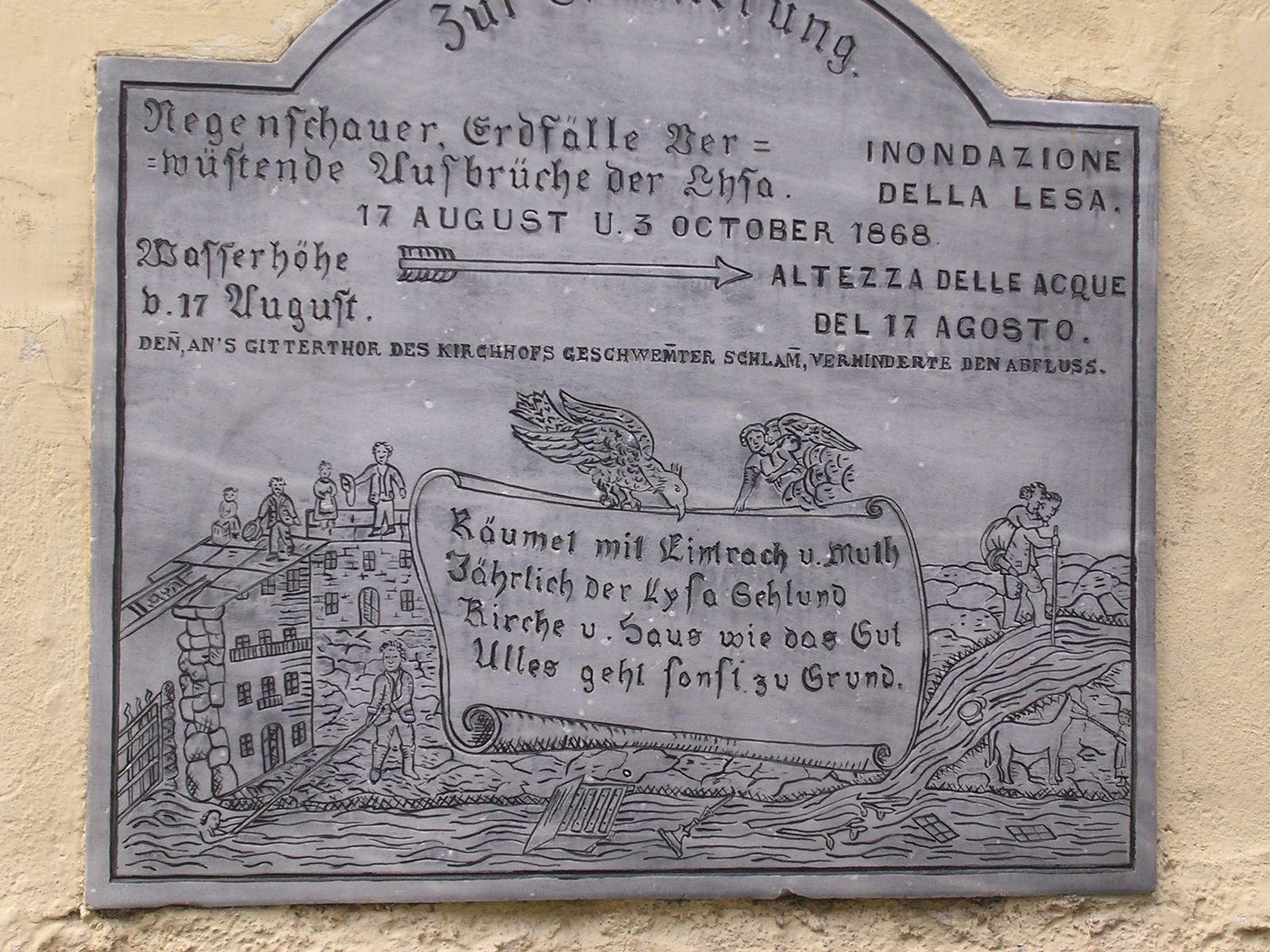
Memorial plaque of the 1868 flood written in German and Italian

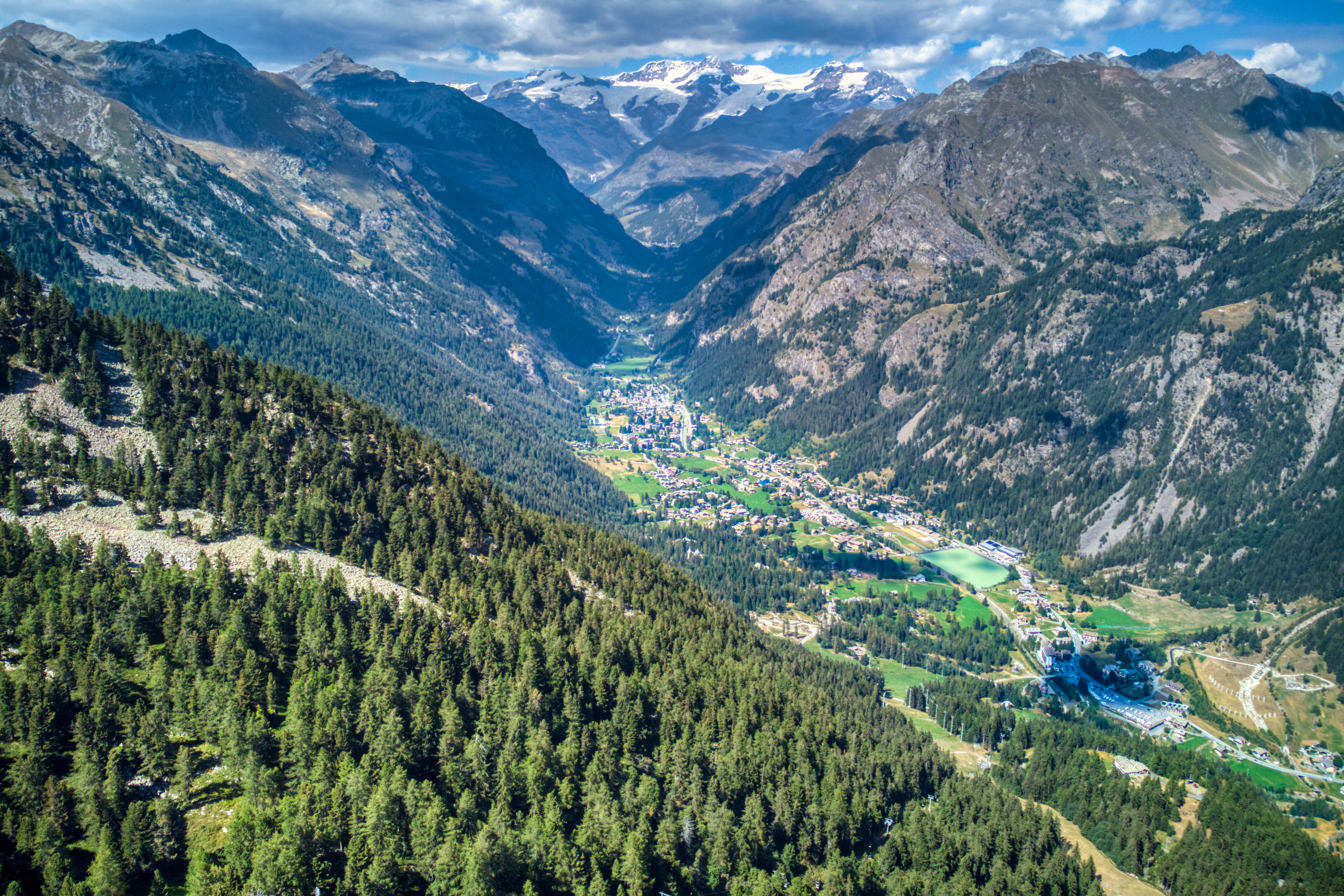
Gressoney-St-Jean in the Lys valley

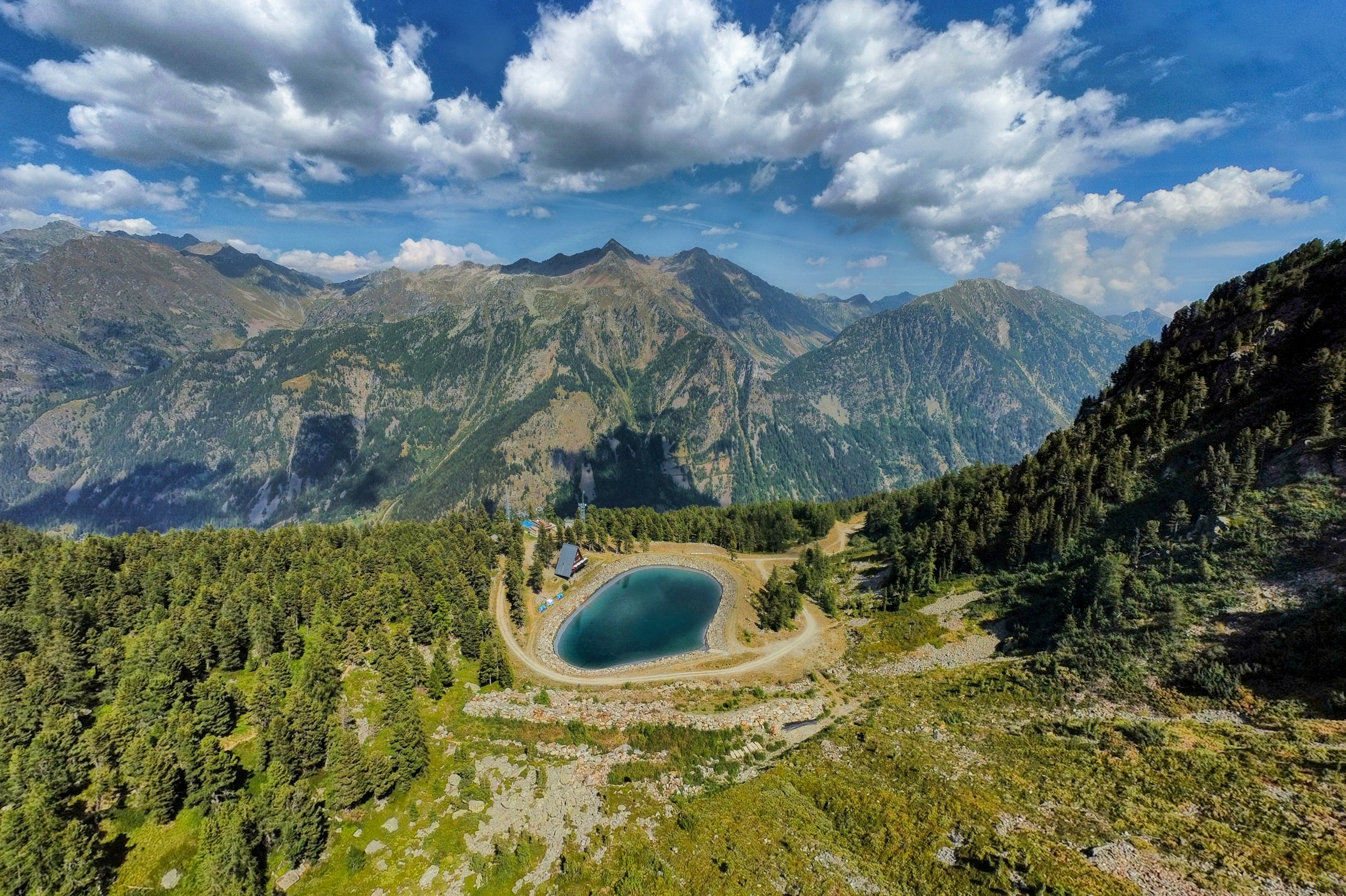
Carlo Mollino mountain hut and Corno Rosso (Ròthòre), above Gressoney-St-Jean

From 1928 until 1946 the two were united into one commune, officially named Gressoney, which from 1939 onward was Italianized as Gressonei. After WWII, the two former communes were reconstituted as well as their original name in French.

An example of Greschòneytitsch:

Walser German (Greschòneytitsch)	German	English
Endsche Attò das béscht em Hémmel, dass héilege sígge Dín Noame. Chéeme Dín Herrschaft.	Vater unser der Du bist im Himmel, geheiligt werde Dein Name. Dein Reich komme.	Our Father in heaven, hallowed be your name. Your kingdom come.

== Landmarks ==
- Savoy Castle, a former summer residence of the House of Savoy
- Savoy Castle Alpine Botanical Garden, an alpine botanical garden within the grounds of Savoy Castle
- Villa Margherita, a former nobles' residence and currently the town hall
