= Issime =

Issime Eichima/Éséima (Valdôtain) Éischeme (Walser) Einsimmen (German)
- Comune
- Comune di Issime; Commune d'Issime; Gemeindeverwaltung Eischeme
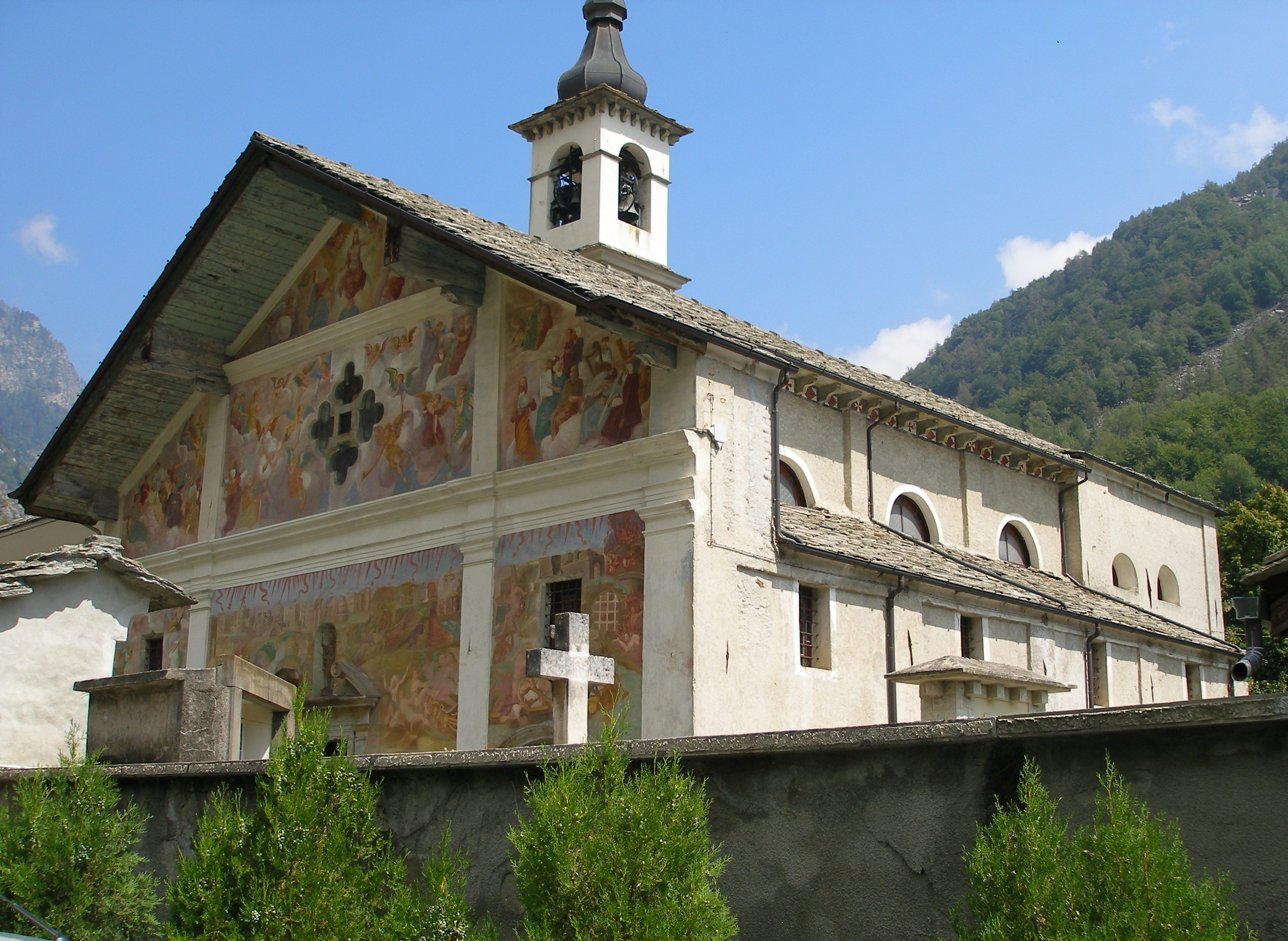
- Saint James Church

- Location within Italy Location within Aosta Valley
- Coordinates: 45°41′N 7°51′E
- Country: Italy
- Region: Aosta Valley
- Frazioni: Official toponyms in French, in brackets the version in töitschu: Bioley (Biouley), Ceresole (Di Zinnisili), Champriond (Tschendriun), Chef-lieu (Duarf or Hauptort), Chincheré (Tschentschiri), Crest (Krecht), Crose (Kruasi), Cugna (Künju), Fontaineclaire (Funtrunkieeru), Grand Champ (Gran Tschamp), Grand Praz (Gran Proa), Nicche (Nicke), Plane (Pioani), Praz (Proa), Preit (Preite), Proasch (Proasch), Ribola (Ribulu), Riccard (Rickard), Riccourt (Rickurt), Riccourt Dessus (Z’uabra Rickurt), Riva (Réivu), Rollie (Rolji), Seingles (Zéngji), Seingles Dessus (Z’uabra Zéngji), Stein (Stein), Tontinel (Tuntelentsch), Vecchaus (Vetschus), Zan (San)

Government
  - Mayor: Christian Linty

Area
  - Total: 35 km^{2} (14 sq mi)
- Elevation: 956 m (3,136 ft)

Population (31 December 2022)
  - Total: 365
  - Density: 10/km^{2} (27/sq mi)
- Demonym(s): Issimesi (in Italian); Issimois (in French); Eischemeyra (in töitschu)
- Time zone: UTC+1 (CET)
  - Summer (DST): UTC+2 (CEST)
- Postal code: 11020
- Dialing code: 0125
- ISTAT code: 7036
- Patron saint: Saint James
- Saint day: 25 July
- Website: Official website

Issime (French: [isim]; Walser: Éischeme; German: Einsimmen; Valdôtain: Eichima (locally in patois gabençois, Éséima)) is a town and comune in the Aosta Valley region of north-western Italy. Its population speaks Walser German.

== Culture ==
Issime is a village of Walser language and culture. What distinguishes the community of Issime from other areas of the Alpine arc, as highlighted by many studies, are its multilingualism and the coexistence of two ethnic groups (the German-speaking and the Franco-Provençal ones).

Regarding multilingualism, which is historically attested, the linguistic repertoire of its inhabitants includes up to five varieties: Töitschu, the patois of Gaby, Piedmontese, French, and, more recently, Italian.

This uniqueness is evident in the dialect, place names, architecture, and traditional costume.

=== Languages and dialects ===
Together with Gressoney-La-Trinité and Gressoney-Saint-Jean, Issime forms a German-speaking linguistic island belonging to the Walser community. The population speaks an Alemannic dialect, Éischemtöitschu.

65.25% of the population understands the Walser dialect, but only 23.88% report it as their mother tongue. Additionally, about 5% of the population speaks Franco-Provençal.

In addition to being trilingual in Italian-French-German (the official languages of instruction in the German-speaking municipalities of the upper Lys Valley), the people of Issime also know the Valdôtain Franco-Provençal patois, due to proximity to the neighboring municipalities of Gaby and Fontainemore. Moreover, thanks to geographical closeness and historical ties with the nearby Valsesia and Canavese regions, many also know Piedmontese.

==== The Töitschu and the Augusta Association ====
Töitschu is the variety of the Walser language spoken by the group of merchants from Valais who migrated southward in the 1300s, primarily due to demographic reasons. Compared to the dialect of Gressoney, called Greschòneytitsch, the dialect of Issime has undergone fewer changes over the centuries. Nevertheless, the influence of the Valdôtain patois, Piedmontese, French, and Italian is evident. The community of Issime is multilingual.

Currently, Töitschu is still fluently spoken by a good portion of the town's inhabitants, and there are numerous school-based efforts underway to teach it. An Italian–Töitschu and Töitschu–Italian dictionary is published by the Augusta Association, along with a journal of the same name that has been in publication since 1969. The association has also published numerous books and essays.

Founded in 1967, the Augusta Association is active in preserving and promoting the town’s cultural aspects, with particular attention to language and the natural and cultural landscape. The association is based in the old parish house in the town center (Duarf).

Examples of Töitschu:

- Vergelzgott = thank you (cf. German Vergelt’s Gott, short for Gott vergelte es – “may God reward it”)
- Chrigschman = soldier (cf. German Kriegsmann – “man of war”)
- Heersij (cf. German Herzchen or Herzlein – “little heart”), diminutive of Heers = sweetheart or fiancé(e)
- D’lljibigotschaugjini: literally “the little eyes of the good God” = myosotis (forget-me-nots)

A comparative example using the Lord’s Prayer:

Eischemtöitschu	German	Italian
Ündschen Atte das bischt im hümmil, Das déin noame séji gwihti, das déin weelt cheemi, das als séggi wi d’ willischt sua im hümmil wi ouf im heert. Gib n’ündsch höit ünz bruat van all toaga, tu n’ündsch varzîn ündsch schuldini wi wir varzîn deenen das n’ündsch séin schuldig, loa n’ündsch nöit vallen im schwache weg, wa hüt n’ündsch ous ter ellji büaschi dinhi. Amen	Vater unser im Himmel, geheiligt werde dein Name. Dein Reich komme. Dein Wille geschehe, wie im Himmel so auf Erden. Unser tägliches Brot gib uns heute. Und vergib uns unsere Schuld, wie auch wir vergeben unsern Schuldigern. Und führe uns nicht in Versuchung, sondern erlöse uns von dem Bösen. Amen.	Padre nostro che sei nei cieli, sia santificato il tuo nome, venga il tuo regno, sia fatta la tua volontà come in cielo così in terra. Dacci oggi il nostro pane quotidiano, e rimetti a noi i nostri debiti come noi li rimettiamo ai nostri debitori, e non ci indurre in tentazione, ma liberaci dal male. Amen

Some proverbs:

- Goan tringhien in d'Lljéisu un arwinnen mit dam dust. To go drink from the Lys and return still thirsty (to be insatiable).
- Varchaufen d'sunnu um chaufen dar moanu. To sell the sun to buy the moon (to sleep during the day in order to party at night).
- Is het sövvil gschnout, das d'hénji hen muan bikhjen d'steerni. It snowed so much that the hens have to peck at the stars.

Töitschu also contains loanwords from neighboring languages, particularly French and Valdôtain patois:

- mutschur (from French mouchoir) = handkerchief
- tretwar (from French trottoir) = sidewalk
- rido (from French rideau) = curtain
- verdscháts (= squirrel), from the Franco-Provençal verdjáts

=== Sample text ===
Spoken recording of a text about the midnight snack of a rural community, in the Highest Alemannic dialect of Issime, Aosta Valley (Italy).

Z’Éischeme, z’beerg ol im grunn, wénn mu het kheen antwier z’wacht, gschlecht, nachpara ol gséllji ischt gsinh dar brouch z’hannun as kollutziunh, sua auch vür a rüddu (troa hoei, troa mischt im moane, ecc.). Unz as sibenzg joar hinner, Sen Kroasch beerga, vür d’Winnacht, sén gsinh volli lljöit mita dam via um étzen z’hoei un aschparren das im grunn vür dan gruasse winter. Ievun voaren ingier, tor eini, tor endri hen avittrut d’nachpara un ghannut as kollutziunh wass dschi hen kheen zam hous: wust un dschambunh, gute chiesch, chüjini, bloat néidlu ol batüwa, kaffi, milch, wéin, hunkh um essen mit dam bruat. Wa wéilu voart, antwier das ischt gcheen a wissu ischt kannhe lotze um etwas gschöjun. Im Ronh, darwil eina der wachtunu, ellji sén gsinh im pielljhe un séntsch nen kannhen troan awek d’chüjini van im hous … um dschi essen mit anner gséllji … auch das ischt gsinh an brouch. Zam méztku, bsinnimich lannhuscht, hentsch toan z’grobschta allz im selben tag, un dé spoat d’nacht, het mu mussun chorrun da nawe wust un z’buddinh, as poar trüffili ol stekhjini um essen darmit un etwas z’tringhien … wir chinn sén aschuan gsinh z’schloafe un séntsch nüntsch kannhen arwékhjen un troa chorrun z’buddinh. Génh wénn mu het kesse ol trunghe, séjiis in as kollutziunh ol wachen am tuate, z’miternacht hentsch gmachut z’kaffi, ol vür gien da vargeb, woa dschi hen keen elljene an trungh, hentsch nündsch zeihut z’gwintschen vür d’lljaubu sieli; “Gottsch ergans vür d’lljaubu sieli”, un d’chinn: “das war mieje wacksen gsünni, grechi un gwoaltigi”.	In Issime, whether in the alpine pastures or down in the valley, when someone came to keep vigil—relatives, neighbors, or friends—it was customary to prepare a late-night snack. The same applied during a corvée (bringing in hay, carrying firewood by moonlight, etc.). Until seventy years ago, the San Grato valley was inhabited during Advent—people had gone up with their livestock to consume the mountain fodder and save the lower pasture's hay for the heart of winter. Before descending, now one family, now another would invite the neighbors and prepare a late-night snack with whatever they had at home: salami and prosciutto, good toma cheese, fritters, whipped cream, batüwa (whipped cream with eggs, wine, and sugar), coffee, milk, wine, and honey to eat with bread. But sometimes, someone who had heard about it would hide nearby to steal something. At Ronh, during one of these vigils, everyone was in the dining room, and someone entered the kitchen to steal the fritters... to eat them with other friends. That, too, was a custom. At the pig slaughter, I remember, long ago, almost everything was done in one day. And late at night, you still had to taste the fresh salami and blood sausage, with potatoes or breadsticks to go with it, and something to drink. We children were already asleep, and they would wake us up to taste the blood sausage. Whenever food and drink were offered—whether during vigils or funeral wakes—coffee was made at midnight. When visiting the deceased, where a drink was offered to all, we were taught to offer it for the souls in Purgatory: “May God grant it to the souls in Purgatory,” and the children would add: “So that we may grow up healthy, strong, and honest.”

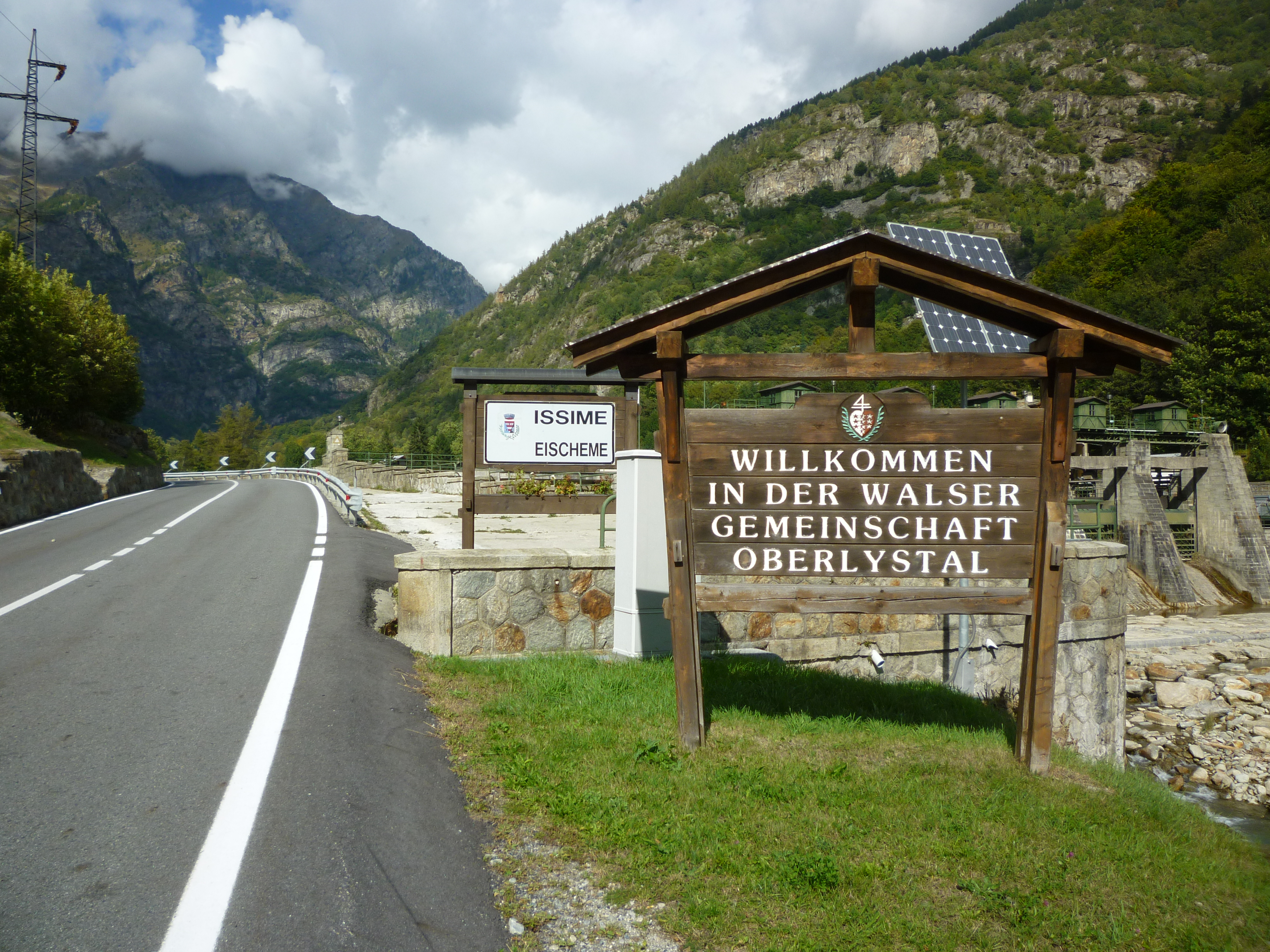
Welcome road sign at the entrance to the municipality of Issime and the Walser community of the upper Lys Valley.
