= Gaby, Aosta Valley =

Gaby Gabi (Valdôtain) Goobi/Überlann (Walser)
- Comune
- Comune di Gaby; Commune de Gaby
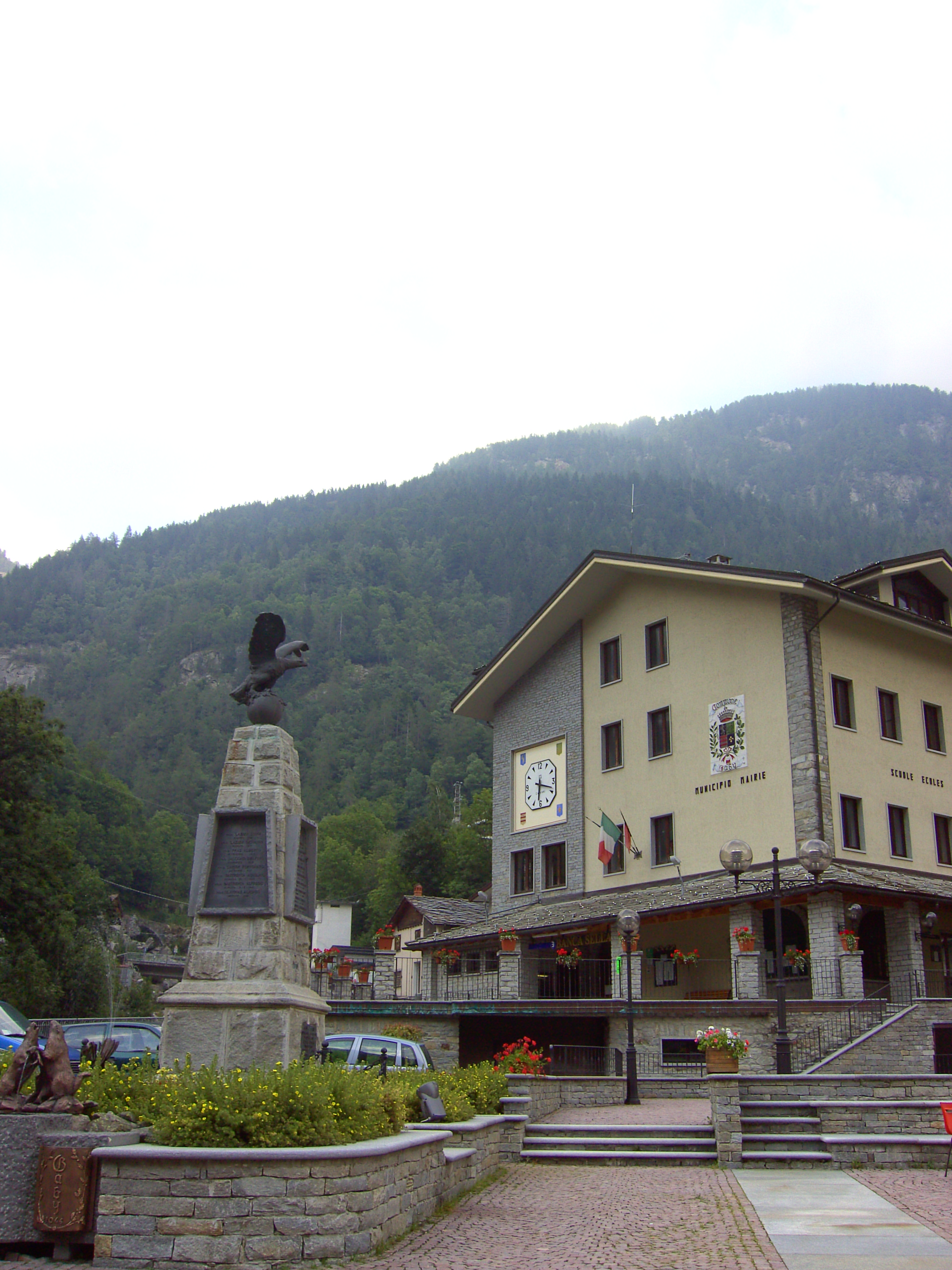
- The town hall and the school.

- Coat of arms

- Location within Italy Location within Aosta Valley
- Coordinates: 45°42′16″N 7°53′2″E
- Country: Italy
- Region: Aosta Valley
- Province: none
- Frazioni: Bouri, Chanton Desor, Chanton Desout, Chef-lieu, Crusmato, Gattinéry, Gruba, Niel, Pont-de-Trentaz, Rubin, Serta Desor, Serta Desout, Tzendelabò, Pro du Toucco, Yair Desout, Moulin, Palatz, Halberpein, Voury, Yair Desor, Zappegly, Zuino

Government
  - Mayor: Pierluigi Ropele

Area
  - Total: 32.46 km^{2} (12.53 sq mi)
- Elevation: 1,047 m (3,435 ft)

Population (31 December 2022)
  - Total: 423
  - Density: 13.0/km^{2} (33.8/sq mi)
- Demonym: Gabençois
- Time zone: UTC+1 (CET)
  - Summer (DST): UTC+2 (CEST)
- Postal code: 11020
- Dialing code: 0125
- Patron saint: Archangel Michael
- Saint day: 29 September
- Website: Official website

Gaby French pronunciation (Walser: Goobi; Issime Walser: Überlann, lit. 'Upper Land'; Valdôtain: Gabi) is a town and comune in the Aosta Valley region of northwestern Italy.

== Landmarks ==
- Sanctuary of Voury

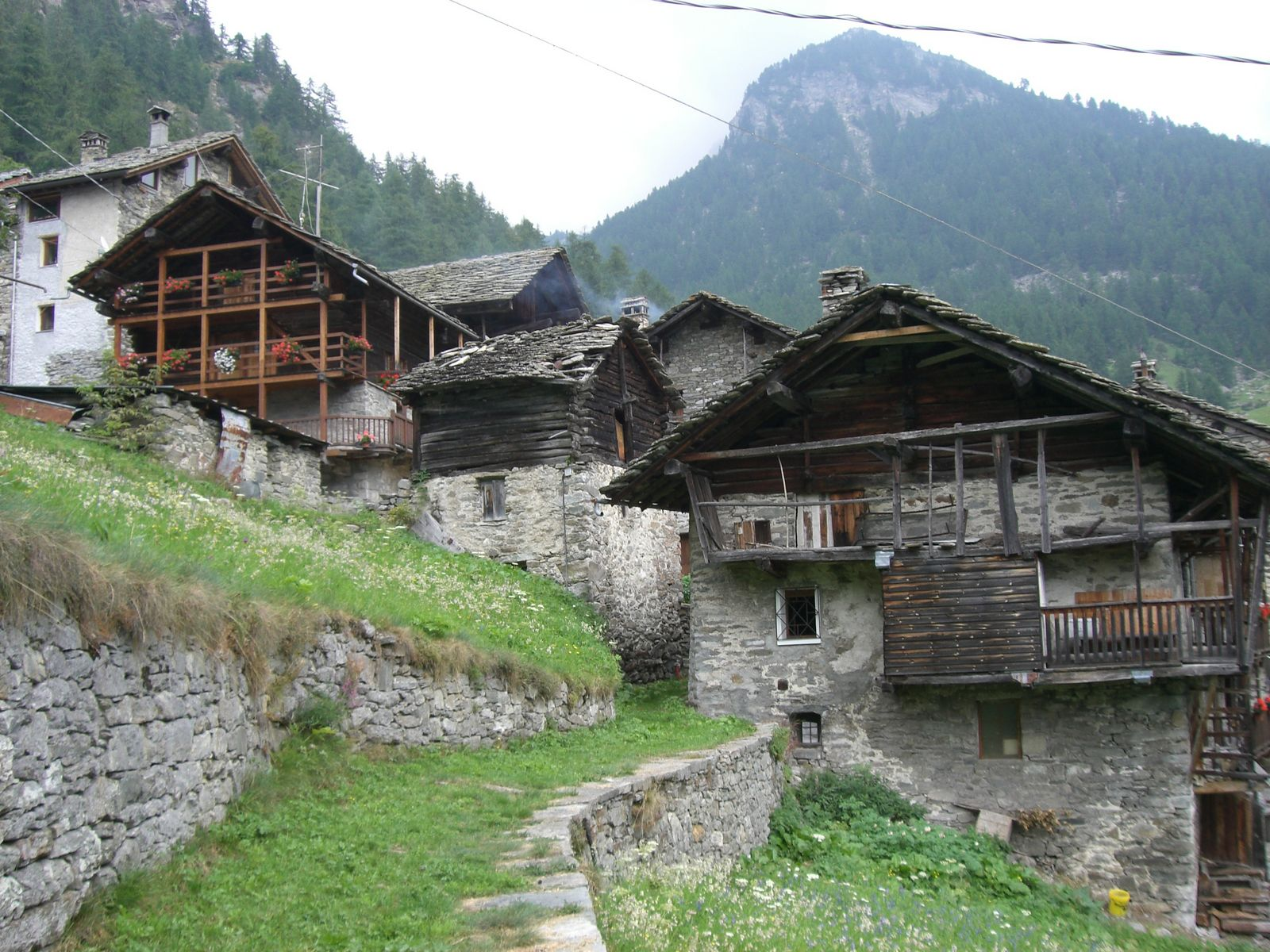
The village of Niel, with the typic Walser houses called Stadel.

== See also ==
- Media related to Gaby (comune, Italy) at Wikimedia Commons
