= Savoy Castle, Gressoney-Saint-Jean =

Savoy Castle
- Castel Savoia (Italian); Château Savoie (French)
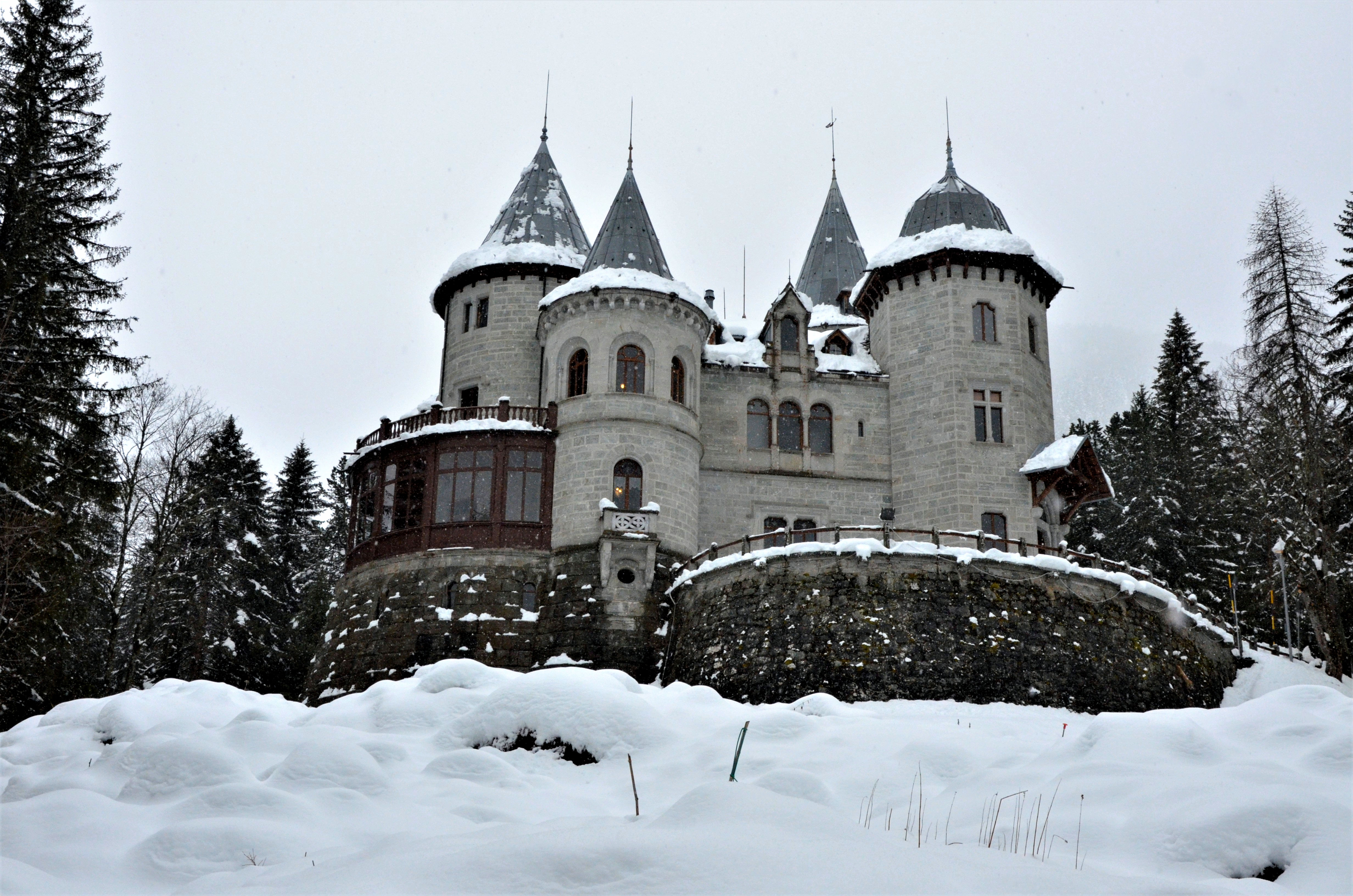
- Savoy Castle in Gressoney-Saint-Jean
- Click on the map for a fullscreen view

General information
- Location: Gressoney-Saint-Jean, Italy
- Coordinates: 45°45′51″N 7°49′36″E

Design and construction
- Architect: Emilio Stramucci

Savoy Castle (Italian: Castel Savoia; French: Château Savoie) is a historic residence situated in Gressoney-Saint-Jean, Italy, near the village of Òbre Biel.

== History ==
The villa, commissioned by Margherita of Savoy, was designed by Italian architect Emilio Stramucci and built between 1899 and 1904, with the first stone being laid on August 24, 1899. Margherita of Savoy took the decision to build her own residence in Gressoney after being fascinated by the beauty of the Lys Valley during her several stays there as host in the villa of Barons Peck-Beccoz, later renamed into Villa Margherita in her honor.

In 1981, the property was acquired by the Aosta Valley region.

== Description ==
The property comprises several buildings, including the castle proper, the Villa Belvedere and the Romitaggio Carducci. The castle is a three-storey eclectic villa characterized by the presence of five towers. The ground floor housed the living quarters, while the noble floor housed the royal apartments and the second floor was reserved to gentlemen of the court.

The castle grounds house the Savoy Castle Alpine Botanical Garden.

== Gallery ==
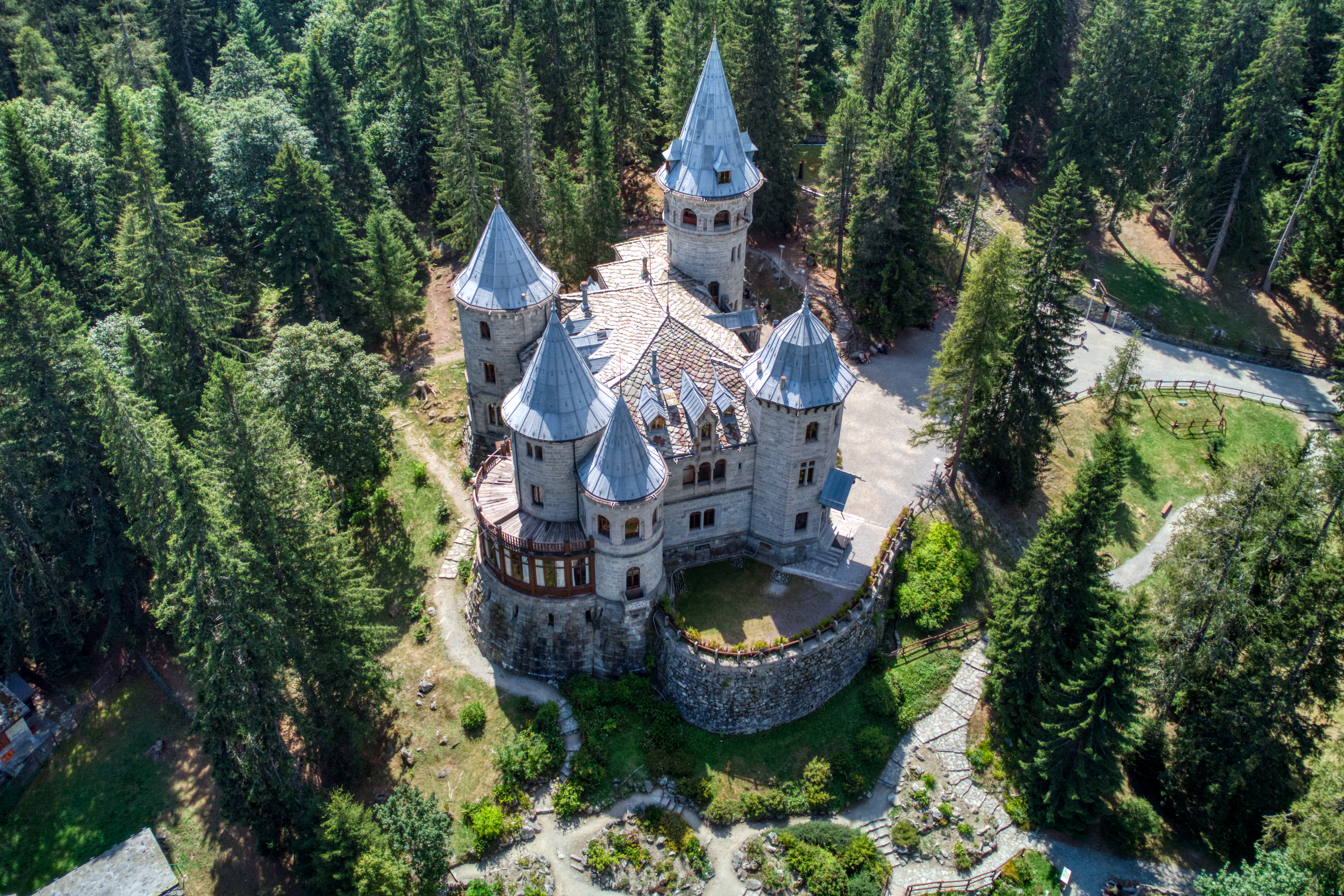

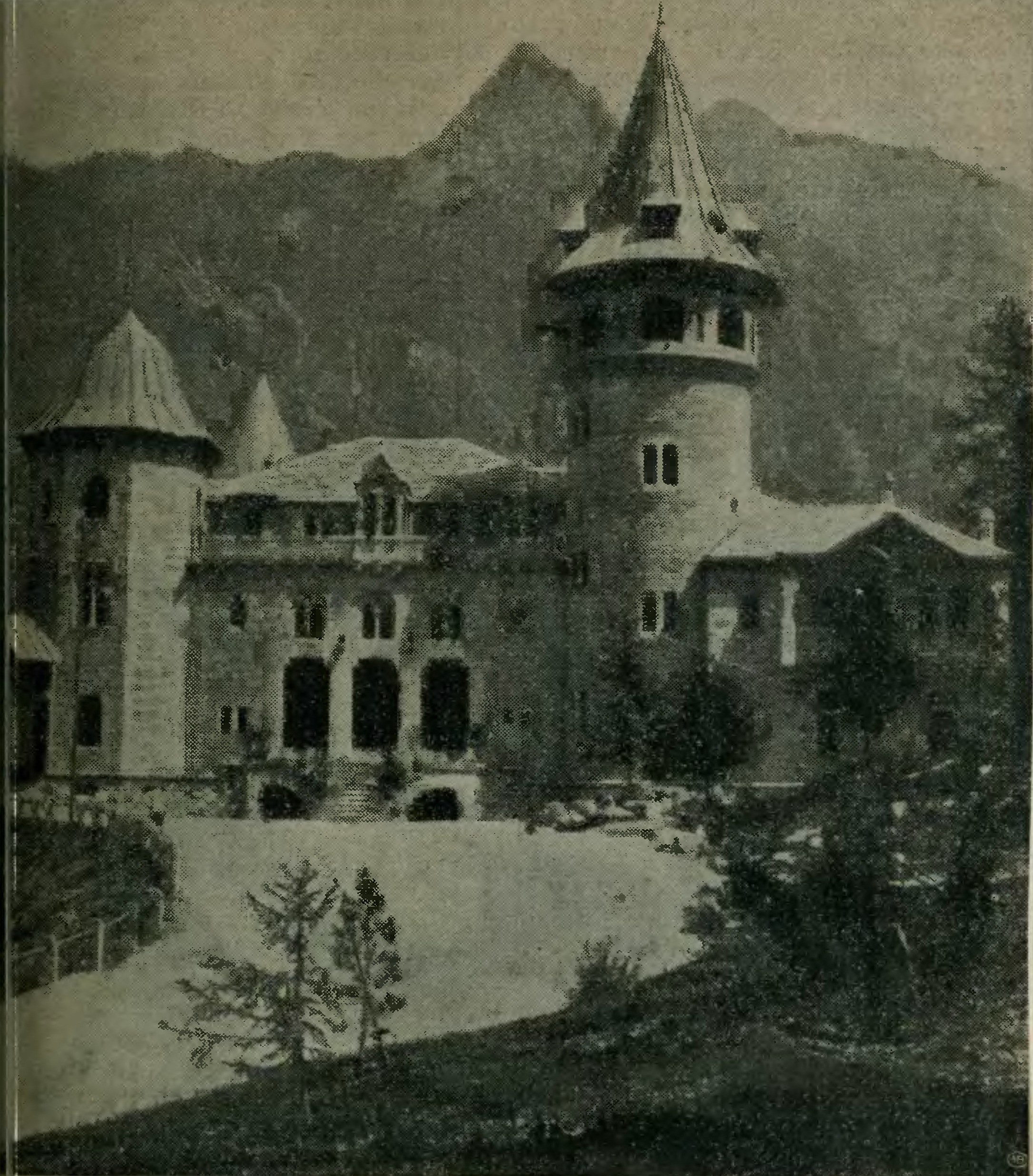

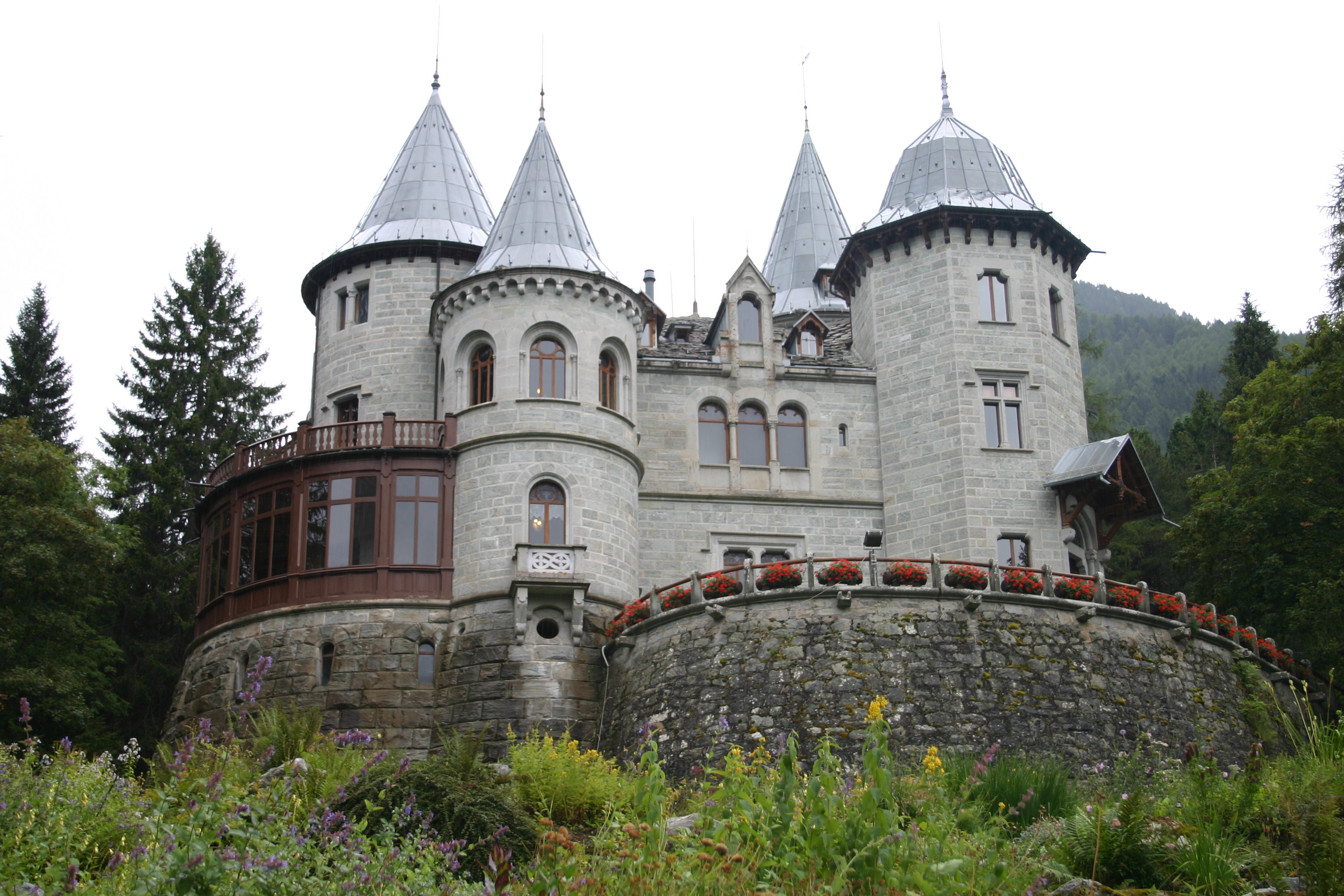

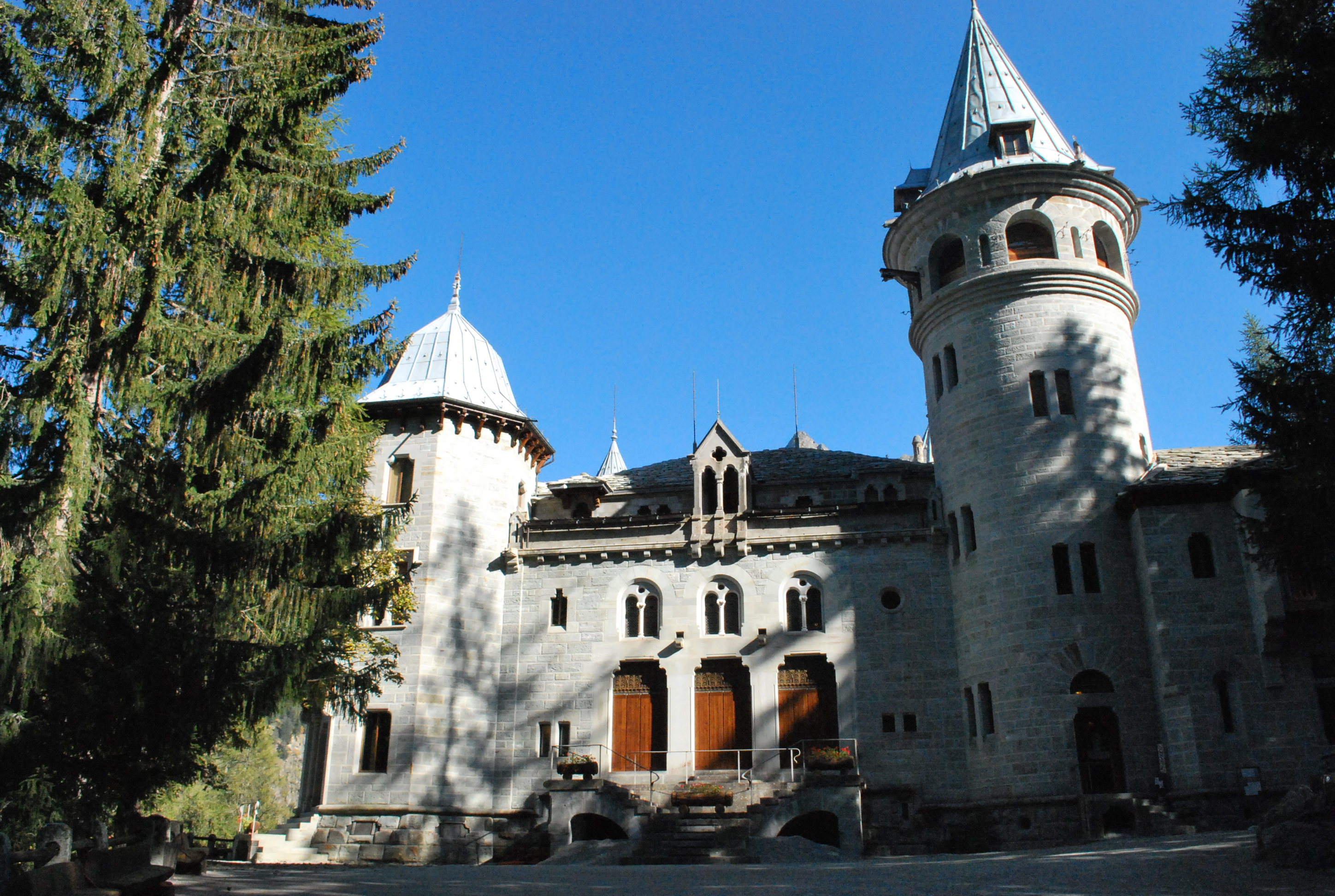
