= Savoy Castle Alpine Botanical Garden =

Alpine garden in Aosta Valley, Italy

Coordinates: 45°46′58″N 7°51′13″E

The Savoy Castle Alpine Botanical Garden (Italian: Giardino Botanico Alpino Castel Savoia, French: Jardin botanique alpin Château Savoie) (1,000 m^{2}) is an alpine botanical garden located at 1350 meters altitude on the grounds of Savoy Castle, Gressoney-Saint-Jean, Aosta Valley, Italy. It is open daily in the warmer months.

The garden was established in 1990 within the castle's park, and is operated by the government of Autonomous Region Aosta Valley.

The garden focuses on the aesthetic appearance of its species which are planted in rocky beds. Species include Aquilegia alpina, Arnica montana, Epilobium angustifolium, Gentiana, Leontopodium alpinum, Lilium martagon, Rhododendron ferrugineum, Saxifraga, Sempervivum arachnoideum, Sempervivum montanum, and Trollius europaeus.

The park was created in 1898 by Queen Margherita of Savoy.

== See also ==
- List of botanical gardens in Italy
