= Barma Lake =

Natural glacial lake in Aosta Valley, Italy

- Lac de Barme
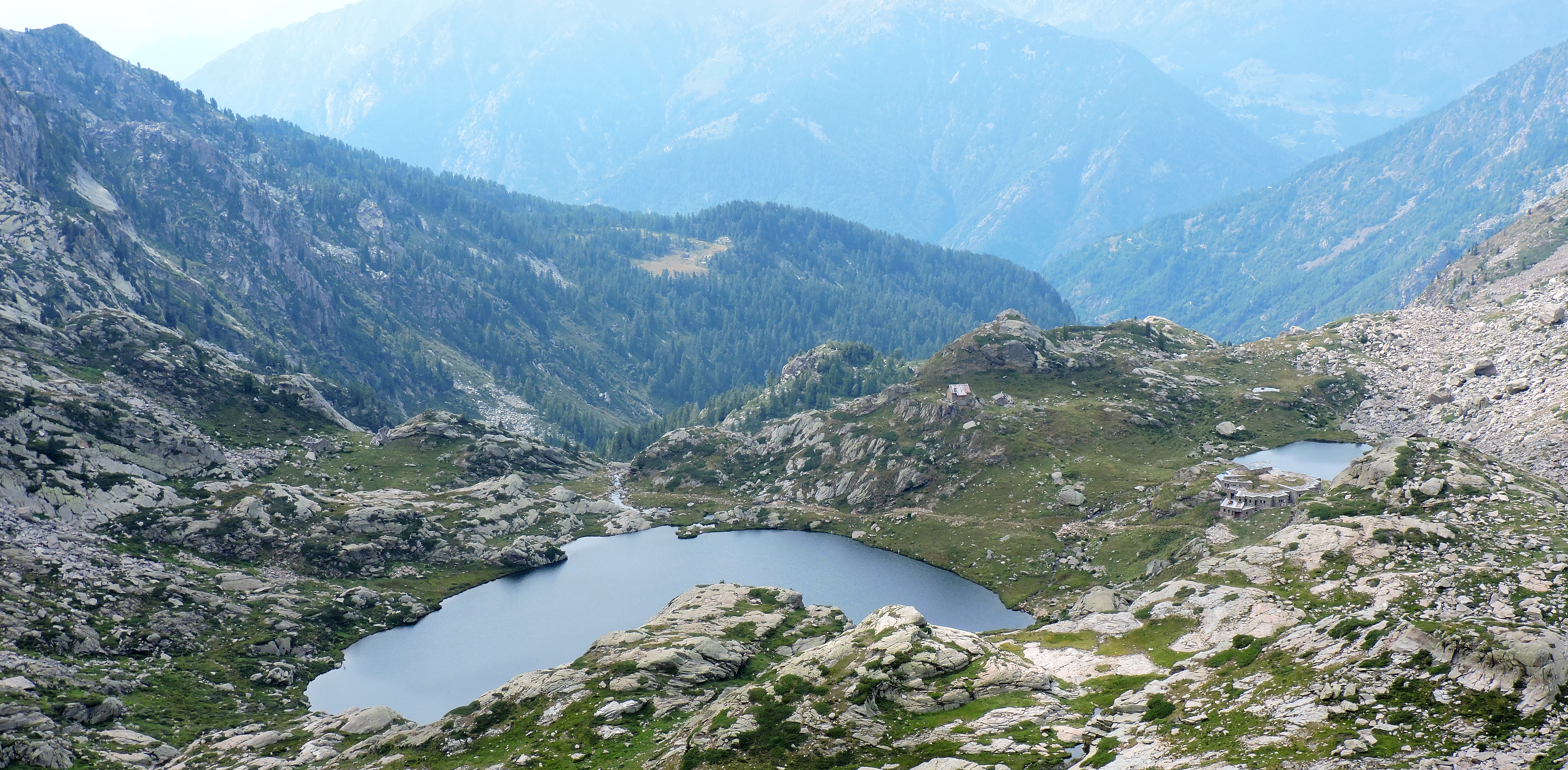
- Interactive map of Barma Lake
- Location: Italy
- Coordinates: 45.64291°N 7.93008°E
- Type: Glacial
- Primary inflows: Stream from Lac de la Cuaz, stream from the upper Barma Lake
- Primary outflows: Stream to Lac Long
- Basin countries: Italy
- Surface elevation: 2,020 m (6,630 ft)
- Islands: None
- Settlements: Fontainemore

The Barma Lake (in French Lac de Barme) is a natural lake of glacial origin located at an altitude of 2,020 m a.s.l. in the Lys Valley, in Aosta Valley.

== Toponym ==
The term barma (or balma, French: balme) indicates a rock shelter in Valdôtain patois.

== Characteristics ==
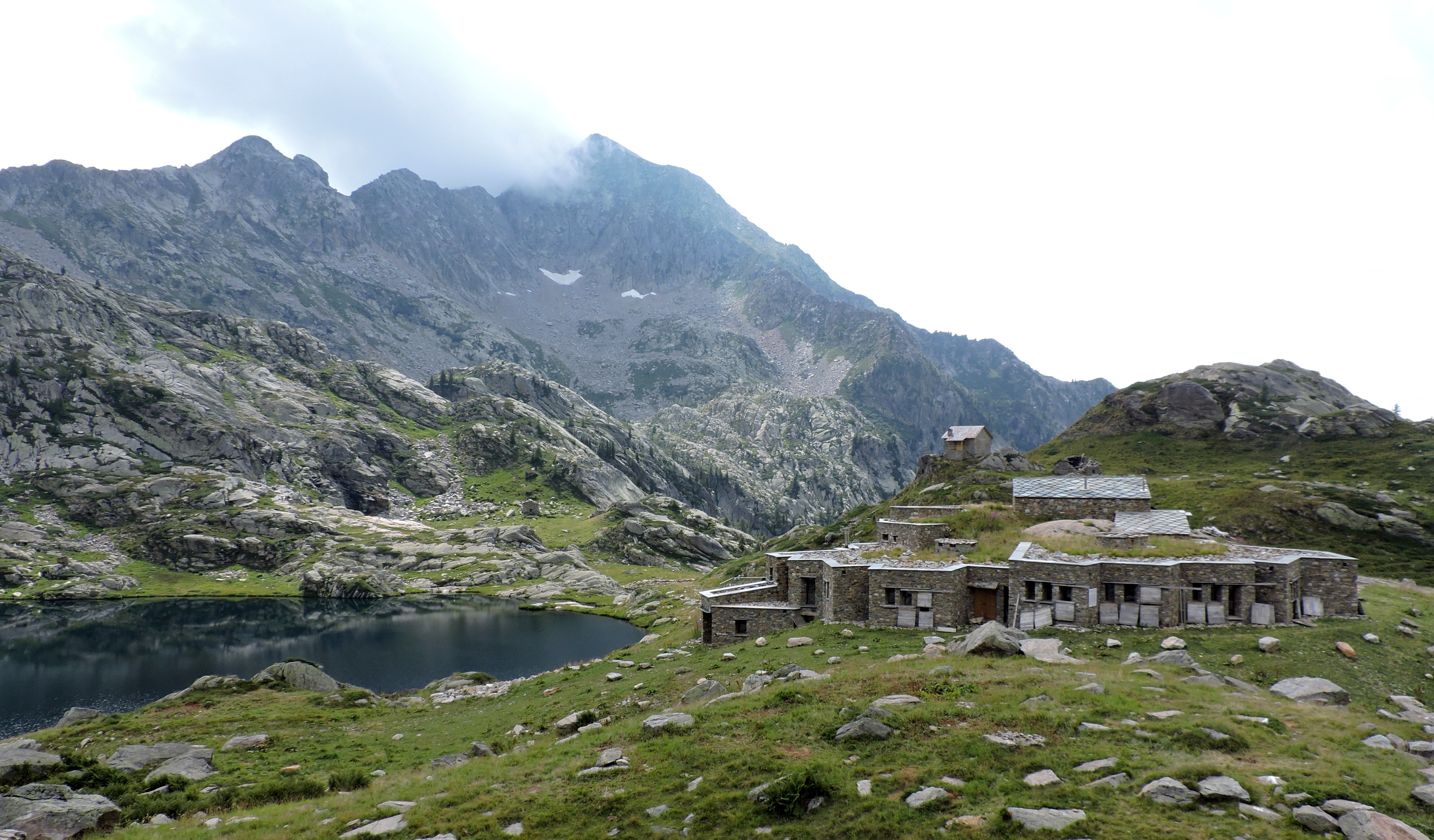
The lake with the refuge under construction (year 2017) and in the background Mont Mars

The lake is located in the municipality of Fontainemore, at the center of a basin dominated to the south by Mont Mars. Just north of the main body of water is a smaller body of water, called Upper Barma Lake, at an altitude of 2,032 m. Near the lake, there is also an alpine pasture and—at 2,060 m altitude—the Barma Hut, a recently built stone structure owned by the municipality of Fontainemore.

== Access ==
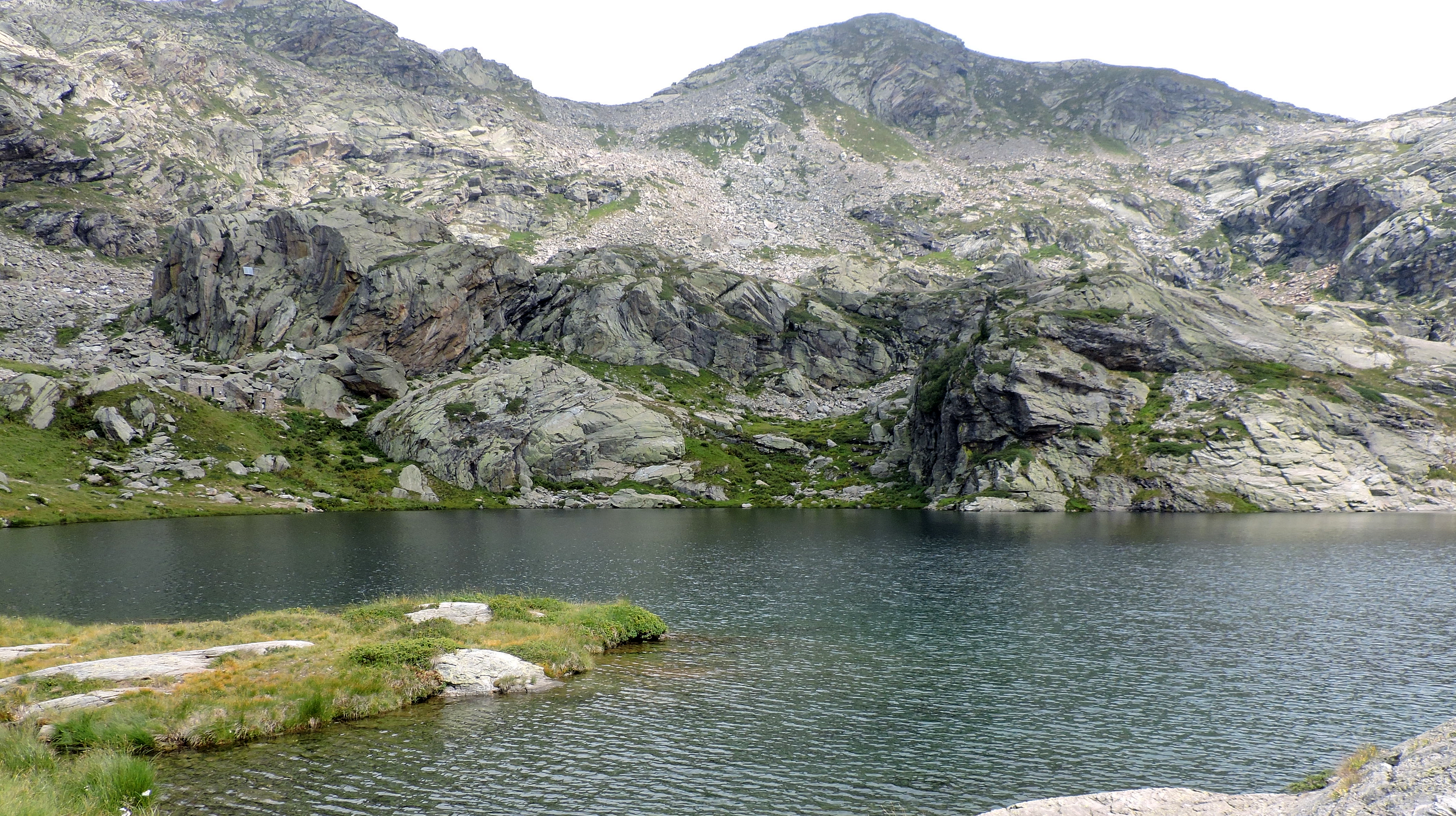
The shores of the lake

The lake can be reached by a marked trail starting from Fontainemore and passing near the lower Vargno Lake. The Barma basin is also connected via the Barma Pass to the Sanctuary of Oropa. Every five years, the Fontainemore to Oropa Procession passes by the lake.

== Nature conservation ==
The Barma Lake and the surrounding area are part of the Mont Mars Nature Reserve.

== Bibliography ==
- "Carta dei sentieri della Provincia di Biella 1:25.000" [Trail map of the Province of Biella 1:25,000] (in Italian). Provincia di Biella. 2004. Archived from the original on 5 November 2019.
- "Cartografia ufficiale italiana dell'Istituto Geografico Militare (IGM) in scala 1:25.000 e 1:100.000" [Official Italian cartography of the Istituto Geografico Militare (IGM) at scales 1:25,000 and 1:100,000] (in Italian). Istituto Geografico Militare.
- Carta dei sentieri e dei rifugi scala 1:50.000 n. 9 Ivrea, Biella e Bassa Valle d'Aosta [Map of trails and refuges scale 1:50,000 no. 9 Ivrea, Biella, and Lower Valle d'Aosta] (in Italian). Torino: Istituto Geografico Centrale.
