= Walser German =

Group of Highest Alemannic dialects

- Walscher, Wallissertitsch
- Native to: Switzerland, Italy, Austria, Liechtenstein
- Region: upper Valais & Walser, the Alps
- Ethnicity: Walser people
- Native speakers: 22,780 (10,000 in Switzerland) (2004)
- Language family: Indo-European: Germanic; West Germanic; Elbe Germanic; High German; Upper German; Alemannic German; Highest Alemannic German; Walser German

Language codes
- ISO 639-3: wae
- Glottolog: wals1238
- IETF: wae
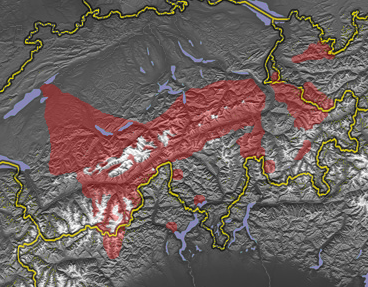
- Distribution of Highest Alemannic dialects

- Walser German is classified as Severely Endangered by the UNESCO Atlas of the World's Languages in Danger.

Walser German (German: Walserdeutsch) and Walliser German (Walliserdeutsch, locally Wallisertiitsch) are related varieties of Highest Alemannic German spoken in parts of Switzerland (Valais, Ticino, and Grisons), Italy (Piedmont and the Aosta Valley), Liechtenstein (Triesenberg and Planken), and Austria (Vorarlberg).

Usage of the terms Walser (Walser people) and Walliser (Valais resident) has come to reflect a difference of geography, rather than language. The term Walser refers to those speakers whose ancestors migrated into other Alpine valleys in medieval times, whereas Walliser refers only to a speaker from Upper Valais – that is, the upper Rhône. Walser migrations during the Late Middle Ages brought Walser German speakers out of the Upper Valais across the higher valleys of the Alps.

== History ==
The Alemannic immigration to the Rhône valley started in the 8th century. There were presumably two different immigration routes, from what is now the Bernese Oberland, that led to two main groups of Walliser dialects.

In the 12th or 13th century, the Walliser began to settle other parts of the Alps. These new settlements are known as the Walser migrations. In many of these places, people still speak Walser German.

Because the people who speak Walser German live in the isolated valleys of the high mountains, it has preserved certain archaisms from Old High German that were lost in other variants of German. The dialect of the Lötschental, for instance, preserved three distinct classes of weak verbs until the beginning of the 20th century.

Walser German dialects are considered endangered, and language shift to the majority language (Swiss French, Swiss Italian, and Swiss German) has taken place in the course of the later 20th century.

== Classification ==
Walser German is part of the Highest Alemannic language subfamily, and is most closely related to dialects spoken in the Bernese Oberland and Central Switzerland (Uri, Schwyz, Unterwalden, and Glarus).

There is limited mutual intelligibility with High Alemannic forms of Swiss German (whose speakers are called Üsserschwyzer "outer Swiss" by speakers), and barely any mutual intelligibility with Standard German.

== Usage in Italy ==
In Italy, Walser German is almost never spoken among children of Walser people and is rarely spoken by their parents and most commonly by the grandparents. Often, older people will speak to younger people in Walser German, with the younger people responding in Italian. Walser German is most commonly but not exclusively used in private and familial settings when no non-speakers are present.

== Distribution and dialects ==
The total number of speakers in the world estimated at 22,000 speakers (as of 2004), of whom about 10,000 are in Switzerland. Because the dialect group is quite spread out, there is rarely any contact between the dialects. Therefore, the dialects that compose Walser German are very different from each other as well. Specific Walser dialects can be traced to eastern or western dialects of the Upper Valais. Conservative Walser dialects are more similar to the respective groups of Wallis dialects than to neighboring Walser dialects.

- Valais: Simplon, Gondo (Zwischbergen)
- valleys in the Monte Rosa massif:
  - Aosta Valley: Gressoney-La-Trinité, Gressoney-Saint-Jean, Issime, historically in upper Ayas Valley and in Champdepraz.
  - province of Vercelli: Alagna Valsesia, Alto Sermenza, Rimella, Riva Valdobbia
  - province of Verbano-Cusio-Ossola: Formazza, Macugnaga, Ornavasso, Agaro and Salecchio (frazioni of Premia), Ausone, Campello Monti (frazione of Valstrona)
- Bernese Oberland: Lauterbrunnen, Mürren, Planalp
- Canton of Grisons: Rheinwald, Obersaxen, Vals GR, Signina (Gemeinde Riein, Safiental, Tenna, Valendas, Versam, Tschappina, Avers, Mutten, Schanfigg, upper Landwassertal, Davos, Prättigau
- Liechtenstein (probably settled from Prättigau): Triesenberg, Planken
- Canton of Ticino: Bosco/Gurin
- Canton of St. Gall: Calfeisental, Taminatal
- Vorarlberg and Tirol: Großes Walsertal, Kleines Walsertal; Tannberg, Schröcken, Lech and Warth, parts of Steeg in Tirol, Galtür and Ischgl in the Paznauntal, Brand, Bürserberg, Dünserberg, Ebnit, Laternsertal, Damüls, Silbertal
- Allgäu: Kleinwalsertal

== Phonology ==
Because the dialects of Walser German are different from each other, it is difficult to make generalizations about the language that apply to all the dialects. This section will be about the Walser German dialect of Formazza, or Pomattertitsch. Pomattertitsch is part of the Highest Alemannic group, which is made up of varieties that share similar features. The Highest Alemannic group contains the varieties of Valais: Walser German dialects in Italy and Ticino; and eastern Walser German dialects in Grisons, Vorarlberg, and Liechtenstein.

The first feature that is shared by this group is the palatalization of Middle High German (MHG) -s- to -sch-. This is very typical of Walser German dialects in general. For Pomattertitsch, however, this does not apply to every word that contains -s-: su 'son', sunna 'sun', and si 'to be'. The second feature is a change from -nk- to -ch- or -h-: German denken to Pomattertitsch teche 'think', German trinken to Pomattertitsch triche 'drink'. The final feature is the lack of diphthongs where they are present in German words: German bauen to Pomattertitsch büwe 'build', German schneien to Pomattertitsch schnie 'snow'.

=== Consonants ===
Walser German consonant system
	Labial	Alveolar	Postalveolar	Palatal	Velar	Glottal
Nasal	m	n			ŋ	
Stop	p b	t d			k ɡ	
Affricate	p͡f	t͡s	t͡ʃ (d͡ʒ)		k͡x	
Fricative	f v	s z	ʃ (ʒ)	(ç)	x	h
Approximant	ʋ	l		j		
Rhotic		r				

- Plosives /b, d, d͡ʒ, ɡ/ and fricatives /v, z, ʒ/ are mostly heard as devoiced as [b̥, d̥, d̥͡ʒ̊, ɡ̊] and [v̥, z̥, ʒ̊] across dialects.
- /ʒ/ is mostly widespread across the dialects of Val d'Aosta and Piedmont.
- In the dialects of Val d'Aosta and Piedmont, a voiced affricate /d͡ʒ/ may occur.
- A glottal stop [ʔ] may also be heard when in initial position before vowels.
- In the Formazza dialects, velar sounds /k, ɡ/ can be palatalized as [kʲ, ɡʲ] or become palatal as [c, ɟ] when within the positions of front vowels.
- In the Alagna and Rimella dialects, a palatal nasal /ɲ/ can be widespread in letter sequences -nj- or -nnj- as a result of a palatalized -n-. Allophones can be heard as either [ɲ] or [nʲ].
- In the Alagna dialect, a palatal lateral /ʎ/ can be widespread as a result of a palatalized -l- in the sequence -lj-. Allophones can be heard as either [ʎ] or [lʲ].
- Among speakers of the Formazza, Alagna and Rimella dialects; all voiced fricatives tend to lose their sonority further heard as devoiced [v̥, z̥, ʒ̊], especially in word initial positions.
- /s/ may have apico-alveolar and post-alveolar allophones of [s̺, s̠] in the Alagna, Macugnaga and Salecchio dialects, and /ʃ/ may have an alveolo-palatal allophone of [ɕ] in the Rimella dialects.
- /r/ may also be realized as uvular sounds [ʀ] or [ʁ] across other dialects.
- /ʋ/ may also be heard as [w] in free variation.
- /h/ can often be heard as voiced [ɦ] when in intervocalic positions in the Macugnaga and Rimella dialects.
- For /x/, the allophones [x], [ç] and [χ] are all heard in complementary distribution. The palatal sound [ç] being heard in Alagna, whereas in the Rimella, Gressoney, and Formazza dialects a velar [x] or uvular [χ] can be heard. In Alagna, a voiced [ɣ] may also be heard as an allophone of /x/ when in intervocalic positions.

=== Vowels ===
Walser German vowel system
	Front				Central		Back	
	unrounded		rounded		Central		Back	
	short	long	short	long	short	long	short	long
Close	i	iː	y	yː			u	uː
Near-close	ɪ	ɪː	ʏ	ʏː			ʊ	ʊː
Close-mid	e	eː	ø	øː	ə		o	oː
Open-mid	ɛ	ɛː					ɔ	ɔː
Open	æ	æː			a	aː	ɑ ~ ɒ	ɑː ~ ɒː

- The pronunciation of /ɑ, ɑː/ may vary across dialects, being heard as either [ɑ, ɑː] or as rounded [ɒ, ɒː].
- Diphthongs may occur as /yi̯, ei̯, øi̯, ai̯, øy̯, ie̯, yø̯, ia̯, ya̯, ua̯, au̯, ou̯/.

== Morphology ==
Again, this section will be about the Walser German dialect Pomattertitsch.

=== Nouns ===
Pomattertitsch marks number (singular and plural) and gender (masculine, feminine, neuter) on nouns, like most dialects of German. It also marks case (nominative/accusative, genitive, dative) on nouns, although it has been reduced over time. It also distinguishes between strong and weak nouns.

Table 1 nouns:

	Masc. strong	Masc. weak	Neuter	Fem. strong	Fem. weak
Nom./acc. sg.	tag	attu	jar	hand	matta
Gen. sg.	tagsch	atte	jarsch	hand	mattu
Dat. sg.	tag	atte	jar	hand	mattu
Nom./acc. pl.	taga	atte	jar	hend	matte
Gen. pl.	tagu (tago)	attu	jaru (jaro)	hendu (hendo)	mattu
Dat. pl.	tagu	attu	jaru	hendu	mattu

Pomattertitsch has definite (English 'the') and indefinite (English 'a') articles that agree in case, number, and gender with the noun:

Table 2 definite articles:

	Masc.	Neuter	Fem.	Plural
Nom.	der	ds	d(i)	d(i)
Acc.	der/de	ds	d(i)	d(i)
Gen.	tsch/ds	tsch/ds	der	de
Dat.	dem	dem	der	de

Table 3 indefinite articles:

	Masc.	Neuter	Fem.
Nom.	e(n)	es	e(n)
Acc.	e(n)	es	e(n)
Gen.	es	es	er(e)(n)
Dat.	em/eme	em/eme	er(e)(n)/ener(e)(n)

Adjectives also agree in number, and gender with the noun it is modifying in Pomattertitsch. For adjectives in the attributive position, there is also agreement in strong versus weak nouns, and in case.

Table 4 strong attributive 'tired':

		Masc.	Neuter	Fem.
Singular	Nom./acc.	midä	mids	midi
	Dat.	mide	mide	midu
Plural	Nom./acc.	mid	midi	mid
	Dat.	mide	mide	mide

Table 5 weak attributive 'tired':

		Masc.	Neuter	Fem.
Singular	Nom./acc.	mid	mid	mid
	Dat.	mide	mide	midu
Plural	Nom./acc.	midu	midu	midu
	Dat.	mide	mide	mide

Table 6 predicative 'tired':

	Masc.	Neuter	Fem.
Singular	midä	mids	midi
Plural	mid	midi	midu

In Pomattertitsch, there is a distinction between impersonal and personal pronouns. The impersonal pronoun is mu, which is third person singular. The personal pronouns agree in number and case, with third person agreeing in gender as well for singular pronouns only.

Table 7 personal pronouns:

		First person	Second person	Third person
Singular	Nom.	ich/-i	dü	Masc: är/-er Neuter: äs/-s Fem: schi/-sch
	Acc.	mich/-mi	dich/-di	Masc: är/-ne Neuter: äs/-s Fem: schi/-scha
	Dat.	mir/-mer	dir/-der	Masc: imu/-mu Neuter: imu/-mu Fem: iru/-ru
Plural	Nom.	wir/-wer	ir/-er	schi/-tsch/-schi
	Acc.	intsch/-isch	eich (ewch)	schi/-schu
	Dat.	intsch	eich (ewch)	ine/-ne

=== Verbs ===
The verbs in Pomattertitsch can be categorized into one of four classes depending on their past participle and infinitive endings:

1. Strong verbs: infinitive ending in -ä, past participle ending in -ä. Examples: schlissä/gschlossä 'close', wärfä/gworfä 'throw', mälchä/gmolchä 'milk'.
2. Weak verbs, Old High German -jan, -en: infinitive ending in -ä, past participle ending in -t. Examples: zellä/zellt 'speak', läbä/gläbt 'live'.
3. Weak verbs, Old High German -on: infinitive ending in -u, past participle ending in -(u)t. Examples: machu/gmachut 'make', losu/glost 'listen', malu/gmalut 'paint'.
4. Weak verbs derived from Italian: infinitive ending in -ire, past participle ending in -irt. Examples: pentsire/pentsirt 'think', studire/studirt 'study'.

The two classes that are most productive are three and four. The third class is most productive in deriving verbs from nouns, and the fourth class is most productive in deriving loan-words from Italian.

Table 8 verb conjugations in present indicative of 'normal verbs':

	Class 1	Class 2	Class 3
ich 'I'	wärfä	zellä	machu
dü 'you'	wirfsch(t)	zellsch(t)	machuscht
är/äs/schi 'he, it, she'	wirft	zellt	machut
wiər 'we'	wärfä	zellä	machu
ir 'you all'	wärfät	zellät	machut
schi 'they'	wärfän	zellän	machun

Table 9 verb conjugations in present indicative of 'special verbs':

	'to be'	'to do'	'to go'	'to know'	'can'	'must'
ich 'I'	bi	tö	ga	weis	cha	mös
dü 'you'	bisch(t)	tösch(t)	ge(i)scht	weischt	chantsch	möscht
är/äs/schi 'he, it, she'	isch(t)	töt	ge(i)t	weis	chan	mös
wiər 'we'	si	tiə	gänge	wissu	chunnu	mössu
ir 'you all'	sit	tit	gänget	wist	chunt	mössut
schi 'they'	sin	tin	gängen	wissun	chunnum	mössun

In Pomattertitsch, a 'dummy' auxiliary tö 'do' followed by the infinitive form of a verb is common for the present indicative, subjunctive, and imperative. This insertion has the same meaning as if the verb was to be conjugated normally: ich tö zellä 'I do speak/I speak'.

There is not a preterite form in Pomattertitsch. Instead, past tense is expressed using the present perfect, which is formed with auxiliaries 'to be' and 'to have' followed by the past participle. On the other hand, the future tense is expressed morphologically by adding the particle de at the end of an inflected verb and after enclitic pronouns, if there are any in the sentence.

The passive is expressed in Pomattertitsch by using the auxiliary cho 'come' followed by the past participle of the verb, which agrees in gender and number with the subject of the sentence: der salam chun röwä gässä 'salami is eaten raw'. The causative is expressed using tö 'do' followed by the agent of the caused event, then the preposition z (separate word, not morpheme), and then the infinitive: und töt ds metjie z ässä 'and he makes the girl eat'. The imperative is expressed most commonly by using tö 'do' plus the infinitive, as stated above: tö frägä! 'do ask, ask!'. Another way is the bare indicative stem for the singular form, and the same present indicative form for the plural: zel titsch, dü! 'speak German, you!' and chomet hier! 'come (pl) here!'.

There are two different subjunctive forms used in Pomattertitsch. The first form is used mainly in reported speech and in subordinate clauses that follow 'say' or 'think'. It also occurs in complement clauses that follow das 'that'. The second form is used for the conditional mood, where the conjunction wenn 'if' can be omitted without changing the meaning of the sentence.

Table 10 subjunctive 1:

	'to be'	'to do'	'to go'	'can'	'to eat'	'to work'
ich 'I'	sigi	tiji	gänge	chenne	ässe	wärche
dü 'you'	sigischt	tijischt	gängischt	chennischt	ässischt	wärchischt
är/äs/schi 'he, it, she'	sigi	tiji	gänge	chenne	ässe	wärche
wir 'we'	sigi	tiji	gänge	chenne	ässe	wärche
ir 'you all'	sigit	tijit	gänget	chennet	ässet	wärchet
schi 'they'	sigi	tiji	gänge	chenne	ässe	wärche

Table 11 subjunctive 2:

	'to be'	'to do'	'to go'	'can'	'to eat'	'to work'
ich 'I'	wetti (wei)	täti	gängti	chenti	ästi (issti)	wärchuti
dü 'you'	wettisch(t)	tätisch(t)	gängtisch(t)	chentisch(t)	ästisch(t)	wärchutisch(t)
är/äs/schi 'he, it, she'	wetti (wei)	täti	gängti	chenti	ästi	wärchuti
wir 'we'	wetti	täti	gängti	chenti	ästi	wärchuti
ir 'you all'	wettit	tätit	gängtit	chentit	ästit	wärchutit
schi 'they'	wetti	täti	gängti	chenti	ästi	wärchuti

== Syntax ==
The Walser German dialect group has the same word order as German, for the most part. For some dialects, however, there is a change occurring in the word order of verbal brace constructions. In German, the finite verb occurs in the second position, and the non-finite verb occurs in the final position:

Peter hat vorhin den Ball ins Tor geworfen

Peter has just now the ball into the goal thrown

'Peter threw the ball into the goal just now'

In some dialects, specifically Gressoney, Formazza, and Rimella, the finite and non-finite verbs occur right next to each other, with the complements and adverbials at the end of the sentence. An example of this in Rimella is given below:

de pappa òn d mamma hein gmacht ds chriz dem chénn

the father and the mother have made the cross to the child

'The father and mother made a cross for the child'

This is a change from SOV (subject, object, verb) to SVO word order. This change is due to the increasing influence of Italian on Walser German. However, the SOV word order is still used when there is negation and when there is an inverted subject.

Some southern dialects of Walser German are starting to omit the subject pronoun of sentences, just having the inflection on the verb to indicate what the subject is. This phenomenon is known as pro-dropping, and is common among languages. Italian is a pro-drop language, and German is not, which means that Italian is influencing some southern dialects of Walser German.

== Example ==
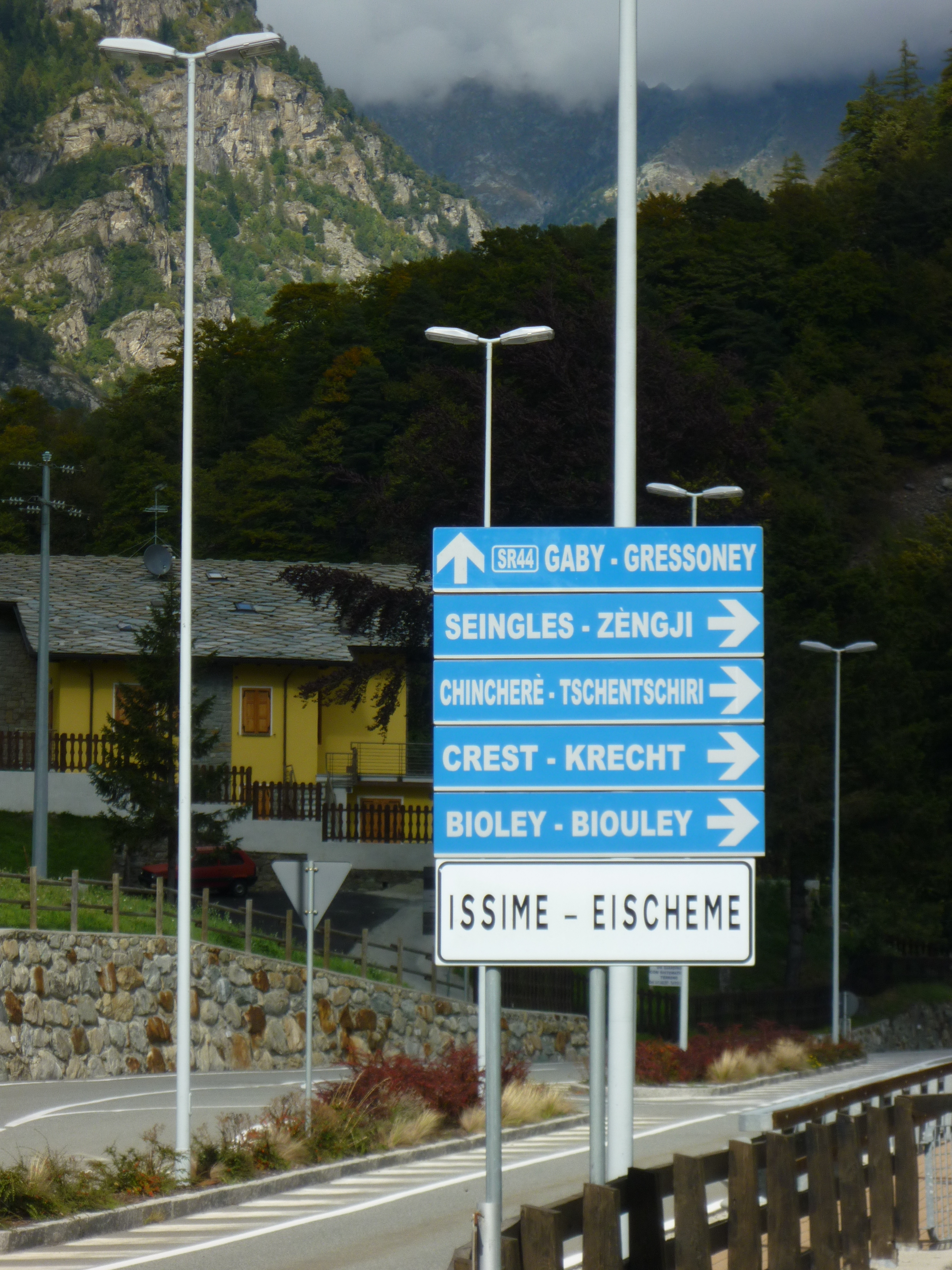
Bilingual road signs (French - Töitschu) in Issime - Éischeme, Aosta Valley

Comparison between the varieties titsch variant from Gressoney Saint-Jean and töitschu variant from Issime:

titsch	töitschu	German	English
d'verwantò	z'gschlecht	die Verwandten	the relatives
der atto, der pappa	dar attu, dar pappa	der Vater	the father
bés z'néchschta	unz widergsien	auf Wiedersehen	goodbye
guetnacht	gut nacht	gute Nacht	good night
guetetag	guten tag	guten Tag	good day
gueten oabe	guten oaben	guten Abend	good evening
jener	dar gruass moanut	Januar	January
ougschte	augschte	August	August
de hònn	dar hunn	der Hund	the dog
d'chatzò	d'chatzu	die Katze	the cat
gä, kä	geen, kee	geben	to give
géeld	z'geeld	Geld	money

Below are some examples of texts, with corresponding translations, in some of the variants of the Walser found in different localities.

=== Piedmont ===
==== Alagna Valsesia ====
A text in the Walser language (Laindertitzschu variant) from Alagna Valsesia:	English translation
«Aford an olti piri häd g'chauft à schworzi hennju van ainem ljikke hennjumandj, dos ra häd g'said: "Haira woul sourg, di bringtne glick". Dan nouchre tog häd d'hennja g'laid as guldis ai. Si hädra woul g'ge z'asse: und dà zwende tog häd's g'laid as anders guldis ai. "Di häd dan buch volle gold", hädra g'sinnud d'olt piri, und oni mei sy virirrd, mid ainem messer tuad uf dan buch der hennju. Wa am platz ds golds, findt si nua ds g'derem und d' hennja ïst g'chleckt»	«Once, an old peasant woman bought a black hen from a young poultry seller, who told her: 'Take good care of it—it will bring you good luck.' The next day, the hen laid a golden egg. She fed it well, and on the second day, it laid another golden egg. 'Its belly must be full of gold,' thought the old woman, and without thinking any further, she cut open the hen’s belly with a knife. But instead of gold, she found only the entrails—and the hen died»

==== Rimella ====
A text in the Walser language of Rimella:	English translation
«''Er haje(n)-entacht d asschu under ts chime, und hawwer noch gvunnut e vljeschpu. Esch hétschech àrkit, und nu schinetsch wié (n) e schtérnu. Wé làng? En ts hüüsch isch mì ljeksch wett...»	«We stirred the ashes of the hearth, and we still found some embers there. It came back to life and now shines like a star. For how much longer? There is little wood left in the house...»

=== Aosta Valley ===
==== Issime ====
A text in the Walser (Töitschu variant) of Issime	English translation
«Méin oalten atte ischt gsinh van in z'Überlann, un d'oaltun mamma ischt van Éischeme, ischt gsing héi van im Proa. Stévenin ischt gsinh dar pappa, la nonna ischt gsinh des Chamonal. [...] D'alpu ischt gsinh aschua van méin oalten pappa. Ich wiss nöit ol z'is heji... Ischt gsinh aschuan d'oaltu, un d'ketschu, gmachut a schian ketschu in z'Überlann. Méin pappa ischt gsinh la déscendance, dschéin pappa, aschuan méin oalten atte, ischt gsinh aschuan doa. Vitor van z'Überlann. Un té hedder kheen a su, hets amun gleit das méin pappa hetti kheisse amun Vitor. Eer het dschi gwéibut das s'het kheen sekschuvöfzg joar un het kheen zwia wetti das. zwienu sén gsinh gmannutu un zwianu sén nöit gsinh gmannutu. Dsch'hen génh gweerhut middim un dschi pheebe middim. Un darnoa ischt mu gcheen a wénghjen eina discher wettu»	«My grandfather came from Gaby, my grandmother from Issime, from hamlet Praz. Stévenin was the father, the grandmother came from the Chémonal family. [...] The pasture [in the Bourines Valley] probably belonged to my grandfather. I don't know whether he was from my father's side. It belonged to my family, they had a beautiful house in Gaby. Victor, my father, was from his lineage, his father, my grandfather, came from over there... Victor le gabençois. Later he had a son, to whom he gave his name, so that my father's name was Victor too. He then got married when he was 56, and he had four sisters, two of them got married and two did not. They always worked and lived with him. Later one of them died.»

== See also ==
- Germanic languages
