= Villa Margherita, Gressoney-Saint-Jean =

Villa Margherita
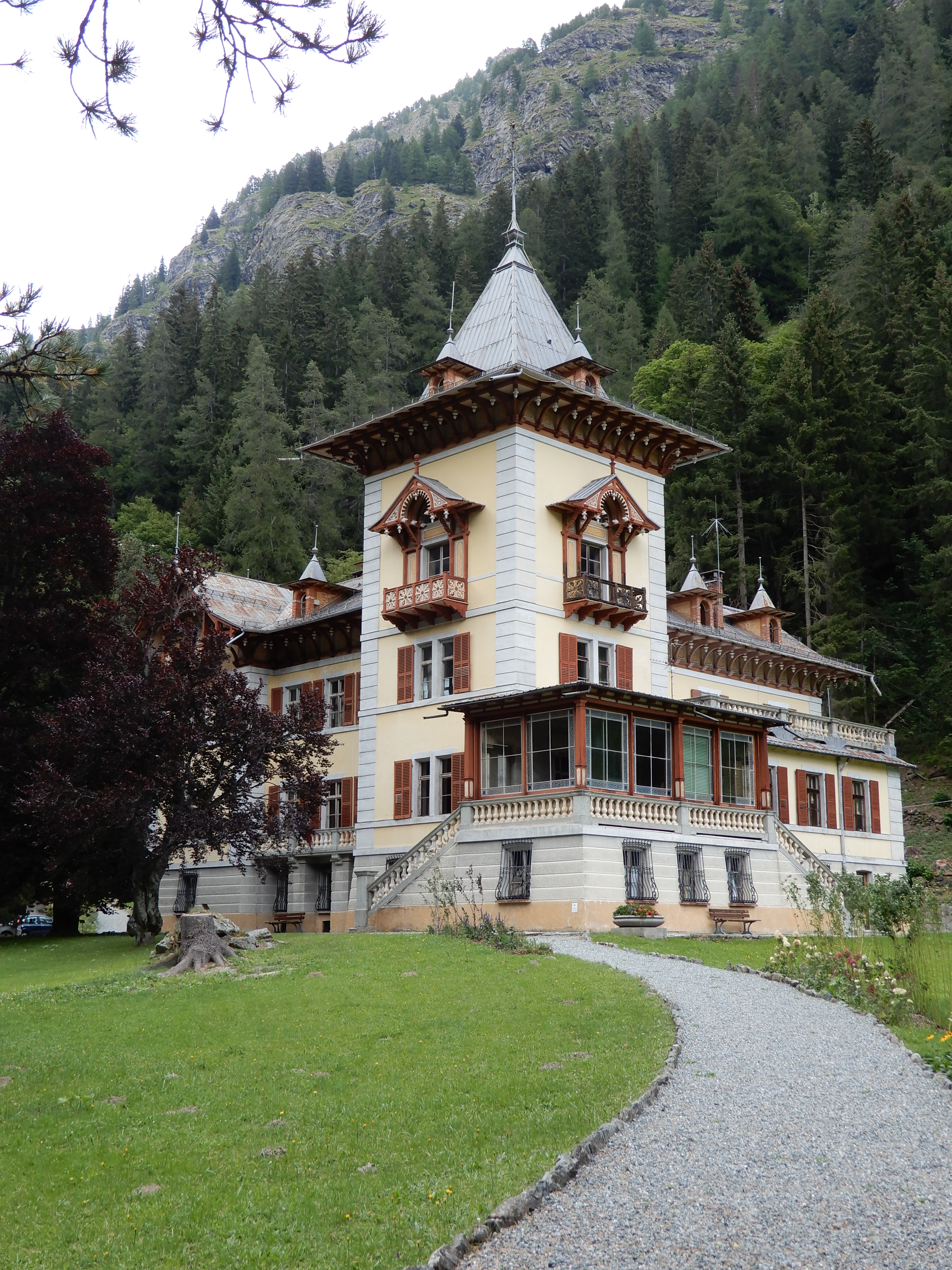
- Villa Margherita in Gressoney-Saint-Jean
- Click on the map for a fullscreen view

General information
- Location: Gressoney-Saint-Jean, Italy
- Coordinates: 45°46′37.2″N 7°49′39.25″E

Villa Margherita is a historic villa situated in Gressoney-Saint-Jean, Italy.

== History ==
The villa, commissioned by barons Beck-Peccoz, was designed by German engineers and erected in 1888. Between 1889 and 1906, the barons hosted several members of the House of Savoy in this home, until these too, fascinated by the beauty of the Lys Valley, built a residence of their own there, the Savoy Castle. The villa was named after Margherita of Savoy.

In 1968, the property was acquired by the commune of Gressoney-Saint-Jean, and converted into the local town hall.

== Description ==
The property comprises several buildings, including the villa proper, the gatekeepers' quarters and the old stables.

The villa, which stands on a grey granite pedestal, features ornate decorations including spires, wooden gables, corbels and parapets.

== Gallery ==
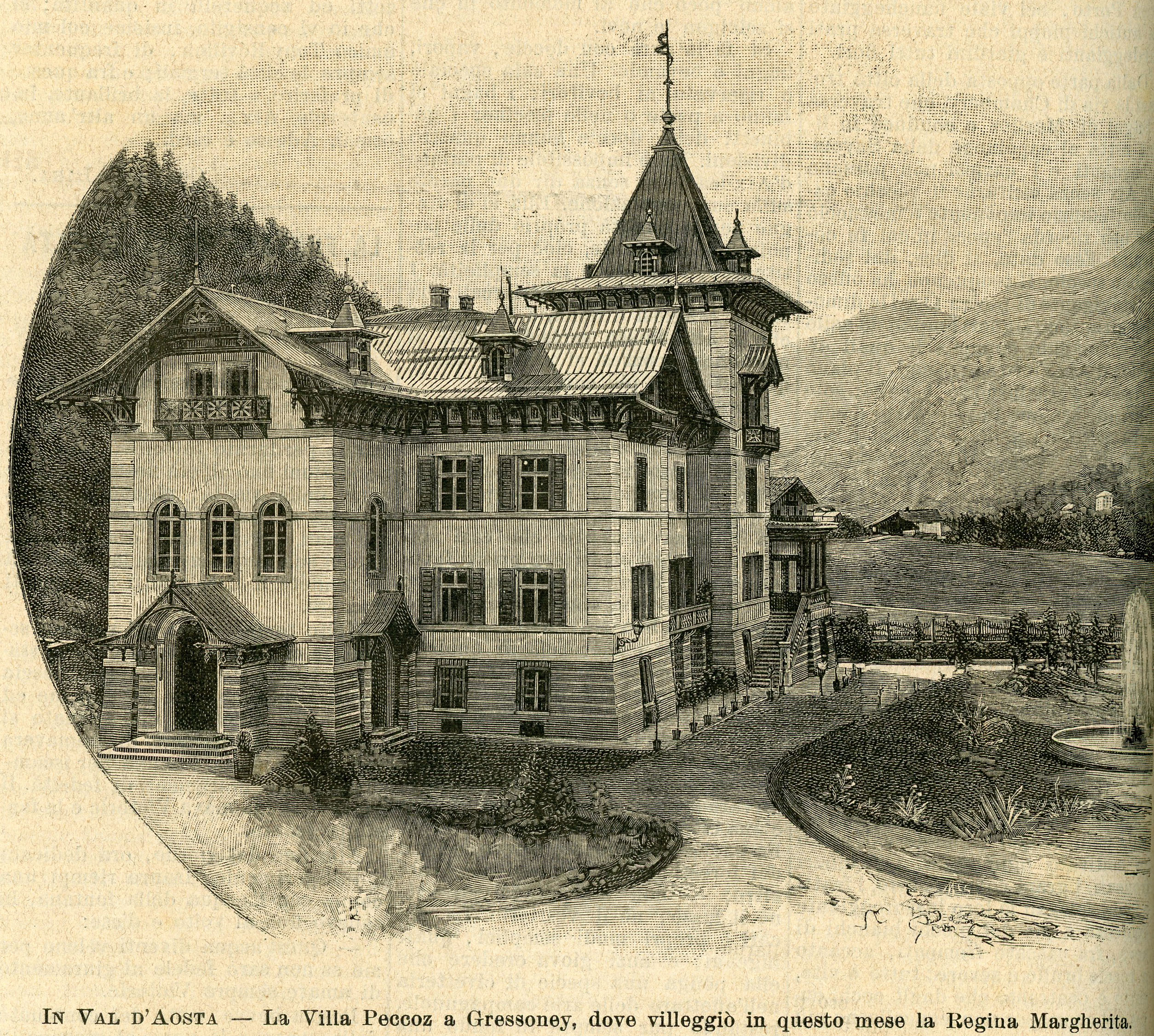

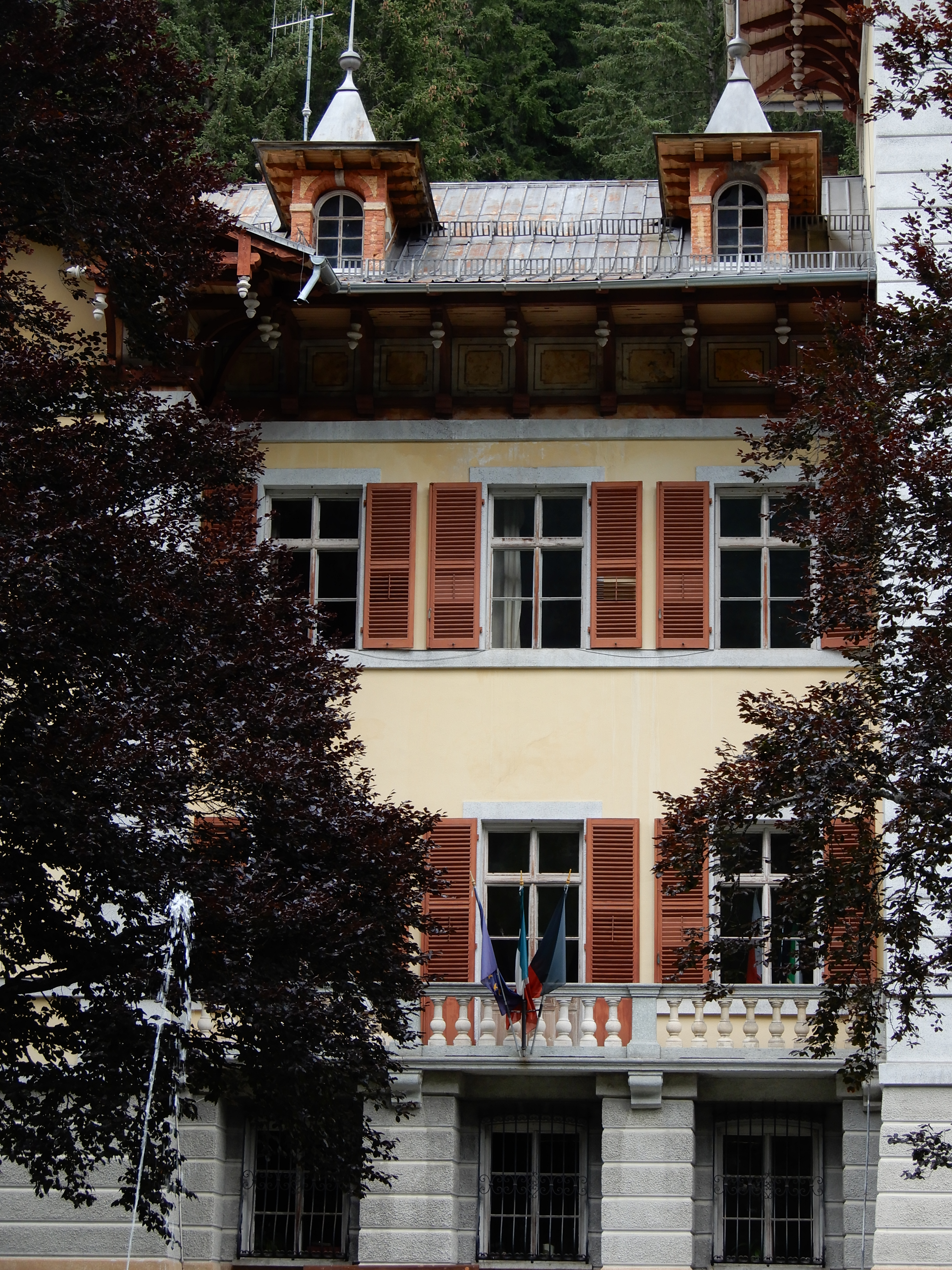

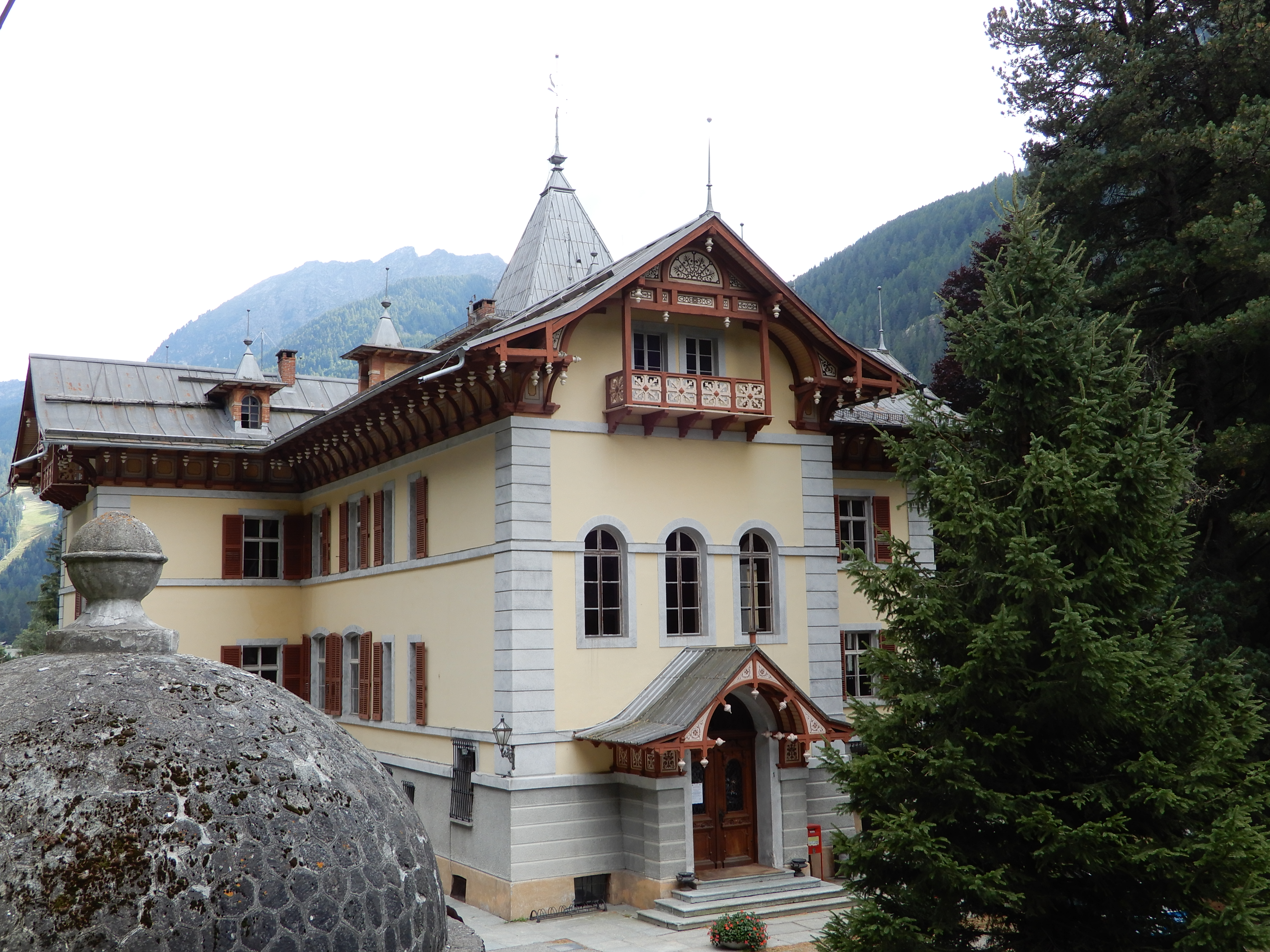
