= Palasinaz Lakes =

Group of Italian Lakes

- Laghi di Palasinaz (Italian); Lacs de Palasinaz (French)
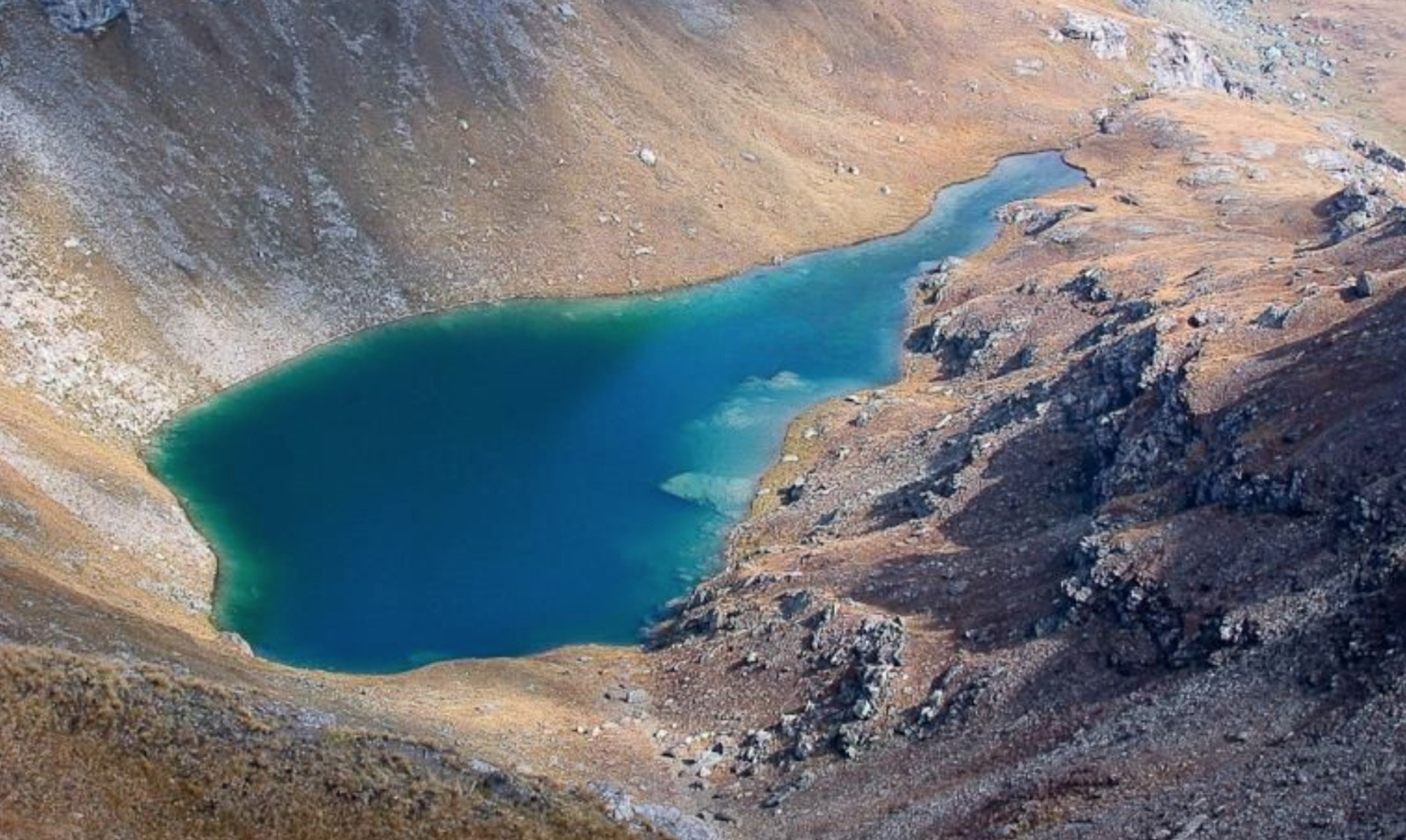
- Lac Long (2,633 m [8,638 ft])

- Location of the Palasinaz Lakes in northern Italy
- Location: Aosta Valley, Italy
- Group: Lac Long, Lac Potcha, Lac du Couloir, Lac Vert, Lac de la Bataille
- Coordinates: 45.7884°N 7.7572°E
- Water volume: 0.70354 km^{3} (570,370 acre⋅ft)
- Surface elevation: 2,668 m (8,753 ft)
- Settlements: Brusson

The Palasinaz Lakes (French: [palazina]; Laghi di Palasinaz in Italian, Lacs de Palasinaz in French) are a group of lakes located in the Italian Alps, in the Aosta Valley region of northern Italy.

They are of glacial origin and are situated in the southern foothills of the Monte Rosa group and are accessible from the villages of Brusson and Champoluc. The group is composed of the following lakes: the Lac Long, the Lac Potcha, the Lac du Couloir, the Lac Vert, and, the Lac de la Bataille.

Above them rises Corno Bussola (3,023 m [9,918 ft])—or Mont de Boussolaz— a mountain in the Pennine Alps.

== Location ==
Map of Italy with Aosta Valley in red.

The Palasinaz Lakes are located in the municipality of Brusson, in the middle Ayas Valley, one of the side valleys of the Aosta Valley.

== The five lakes ==
The Palasinaz Lakes are located in a natural environment of fertile alpine pastures.

This area consists of several lakes, all of which were formed through glacial excavation: Lac Long (2,720 m (8,920 ft), located below the Bussola Pass, French for "Long lake"); Lac Potcha (2,518 m (8,261 ft)), which is located at the foot of the Palasinaz hill. The view from the Lac Potcha is wider than the view from the other lakes due to its higher altitude; Lac du Couloir (2,606 m (8,550 ft), French of "Corridor Lake"), whose waters, together with those of Lac Vert (2,485 m (8,153 ft), French for "Green Lake"), flow into the Lac de la Bataille (2,485 m (8,153 ft), French for "Lake of the Battle"). This last lake is the largest of the group and is characterized by a trapezoidal shape and a large promontory that almost divides the entire lake in two. The Lac du Couloir (2,606 m [8,550 ft]) is located in a small glacial excavation basin.

Name of the Lake	Altitude	Depth	Volume of water
Lac Long	2,720 m (8,920 ft)	143 m (469 ft)	0.10778 km^{3} (87,380 acre⋅ft)
Lac Potcha	2,518 m (8,261 ft)		0.10658 km^{3} (86,410 acre⋅ft)
Lac du Couloir	2,603 m (8,540 ft)		0.09015 km^{3} (73,090 acre⋅ft)
Lac Vert	2,485 m (8,153 ft)		0.07569 km^{3} (61,360 acre⋅ft)
Lac de la Bataille	2,487 m (8,159 ft)		0.32334 km^{3} (262,140 acre⋅ft)

== Climate ==
The climate in the Palasinaz Lakes area is cold and temperate. Temperatures often fall below 0 °C during the second half of September, and start to rise back up again above 0 °C in the second half of May. During the warmest months (July and August) precipitation averages between 130 and 170 mm (5.1 and 6.7 in), with about 15 to 16 days of rain per month, and during cold months precipitation averages around 90 mm (3.5 in). Cold temperature also increases the possibility of significant snowfalls in the area and on the paths. Consequently, the lakes partially freeze (usually between October and April).

== Geology ==
The Lakes are located along the Aosta-Ranzola fault line, which began to form a part of the Franco-Italian Alps between 40 and 49 Ma (million years) ago.

Ancient remains of volcanic chimneys dating back to the Oligocene Epoch, approximately 35 to 22 Ma, have been found in the Palasinaz Lakes area. These volcanic chimneys, whose cones are now not visible, are composed of dark coloured andesite and lamprophyre rocks.

Other geological characteristics include rust-coloured micaschists at the top of Palasinaz Peak, as well light green greenschist and calcite formations in the area.

== History ==
=== Ancient history ===
The Palasinaz Lakes area's history dates back to ancient times. It is believed that the lakes were used as a natural cemetery for people who lost their lives in the mines nearby. They are believed to have been first used by Salassi tribe, and later on by the Romans, whose presence was evidenced by the discovery of coins dating back to the Roman Period. The lakes were important for sustaining local villagers, due to the presence of fresh water and wide pastures.

=== The feudal era ===
In the feudal era, stretch of time between the 5th and 13th centuries, the peasants and shepherds of the Alps had to provide the lord with butter, cheese and other products of the earth. The existence of villages, such as Estoul (from the Latin term stabulum "barn, stall"), is evidenced by documents of that period. In the thirteenth century, the area of the Palasinaz was called Palleysina and it was in possession of the lords of Gressoney. It appeared in 1323 in the will of Ébal (or Yblet) of Challant and even earlier in the account of the feudal investiture of Godefroy of Challant, dated 28 July 1263, in which the amount of money that the nobles had to pay yearly to the Abbey of Saint-Maurice d'Agaune for these lands was set.

=== Conflicts on Lago della Battaglia ===
The biggest lake of the area, the Lac de la Bataille (2,485 m [8,153 ft]), owes its name to a battle that took place on its shores either during the Thirty Years' War (1619–1648), where the Holy Roman Empires were in conflict with a network of Protestant towns and principalities, or during the Napoleonic wars (1803–1815), where Great Britain and France fought for supremacy over Europe. Approximately 600 men lost their lives in the conflict. In this same period the Ranzola Pass was fortified (2,170 m [7,120 ft]).

== Flora and fauna ==
=== Fauna ===
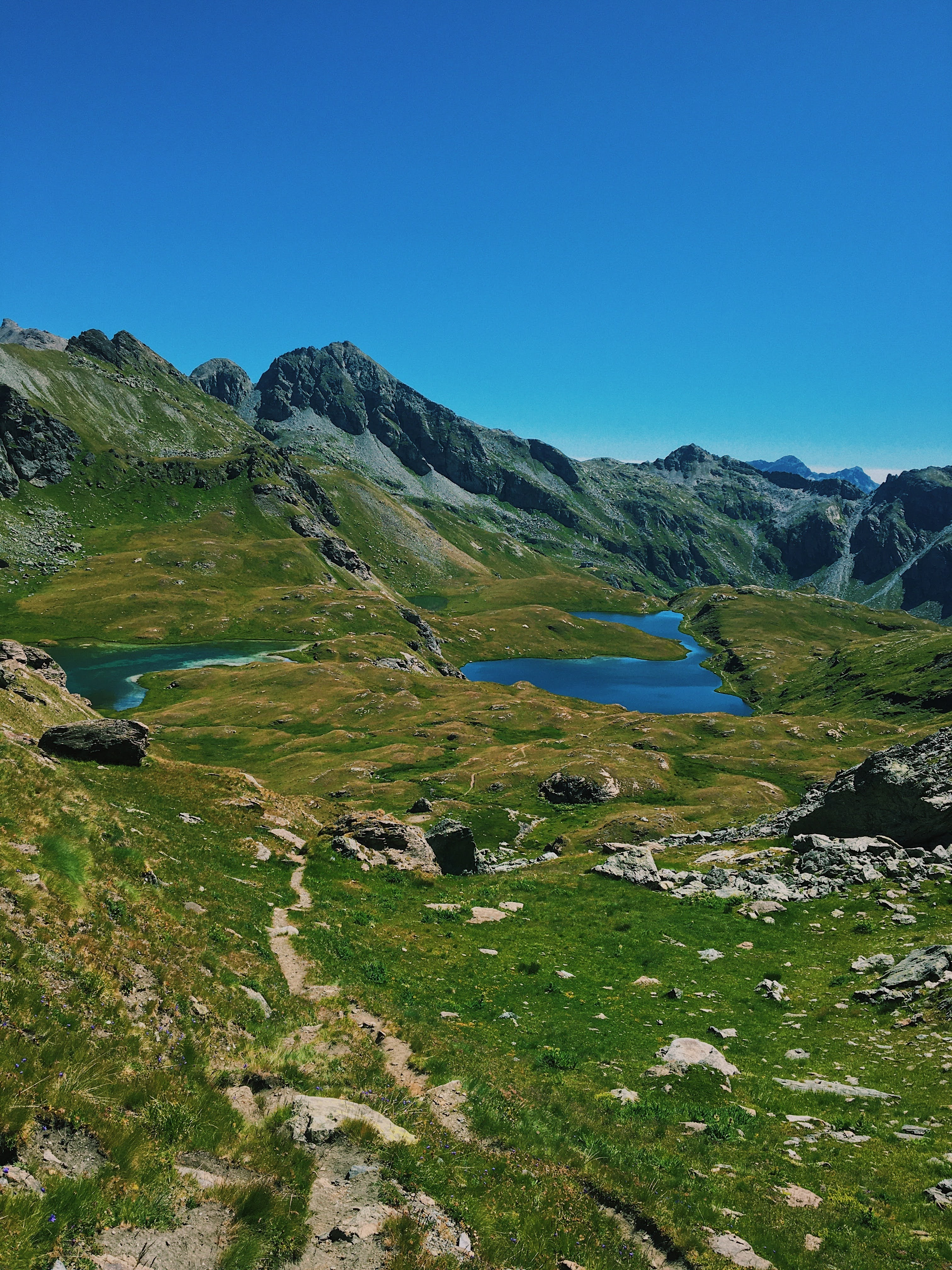
The Palasinaz Pass (2,668 m [8,753 ft])

The area is the habitat of many different mountain animals, such as eagles and Alpine ibex, of which the latter are mainly sighted on the summit of the Corno Bussola. There have also been sightings of roe deer, chamois, marmots, and black grouse in the region.

According to the Regional Agency for Environmental Protection, the Potcha Lake is characterized by fish fauna but lacks aquatic vegetation although its banks are rich in cotton grass. However, both aquatic vegetation and fish species are present in and around the Lac de la Bataille.

=== Flora ===
The Aosta Valley, despite being the smallest region in Italy and largely made up of sterile rocks and glaciers, preserves a distinct biodiversity. This region is home to over 2,000 different plants, which represent about 40% of all plant species in Italy. The great variety of species is due to the many natural habitats present in the area, diversified according to altitude, exposure, rainfall and geological substrate. A diverse range of alpine plant species are found in the Palasinaz Lakes region towards the end of June, including Vitaliana primulaeflora, wild tulips and Eritrichium nanum. There are also various species of Artemisias' in the area, including the one used for the production of Génépy.

=== The Arp Botanical Garden ===
A botanical garden is located near the Arp mountain hut, which aims to preserve the plant life in the area. It contains 84 species of plants, a wetland and a path with some of the typical rocks of the Aosta Valley area. Within the botanical garden there are many medicinal plants, flowers from the Ayas Valley area and many other plant species, including rosettes, fat-leaved plants and Eriophorum scheuchzeri. Many of these plants can be exclusively found in the botanical garden and not in the surrounding wildlife.

=== The Parcour di bério ===
The "Parcour di bério" (Valdôtain for Path of Stones), built starting in the summer of 2005 and inaugurated in 2009, is located behind the ARP refuge and has 17 types of rocks that characterize the Ayas Valley and the Aosta Valley. Set up upstream of the rock, to complete the area dedicated to alpine flora, a small geological path has been created and collects the most significant rocks of the region: each sample, accompanied by an explanatory tag, tells a "piece" of the history of the Aosta Valley. The Alps of the Aosta Valley are filled with lithologies, among the richest in the world; thanks to the internal movements of the earth's crust they overlap and interpenetrate each other. Some of the most important rocks are gypsum (evaporite rock), Mont Blanc granite (magmatic rock), limestone (sedimentary rock) and carniola (carbonate rock).

=== Hiking routes ===
The Palasinaz lakes represent one of the most important elements of glacial origin in the Monte Rosa group. There are several paths that encompass the Palasinaz Lakes area, including:

==== Path: Palasinaz hill (Route 14) ====
This path (Path number 14) starts in Champoluc. It is recommended to experienced mountain walkers as it is long and demanding, with a height gain of almost 500 metres (1,600 ft). This path ascends through Mascognaz on the Palasinaz Hill in about three and a half hours. From the top of the Palasinaz Hill, the descent to the lakes is less physically demanding: the path becomes grassy and downhill on the stretch towards Lac du Couloir - the first lake on the route - located just below the hill.

==== Path: Estoul - Laghi Palasinaz (Route 11b) ====
In order to reach the summit in the shortest possible time, the Refuge Arp, Litteran Lake and the crossing of the Bringuez Pass are excluded from this route. It incorporates some flat paths, normally used by beginners and families with children. This ascent can also be utilized as the approach to excursions requiring more experience. One of these is itinerary 42, which leads to Corno Bussola (3,023 m [9,918 ft]), a mountain in the Pennine Alps.

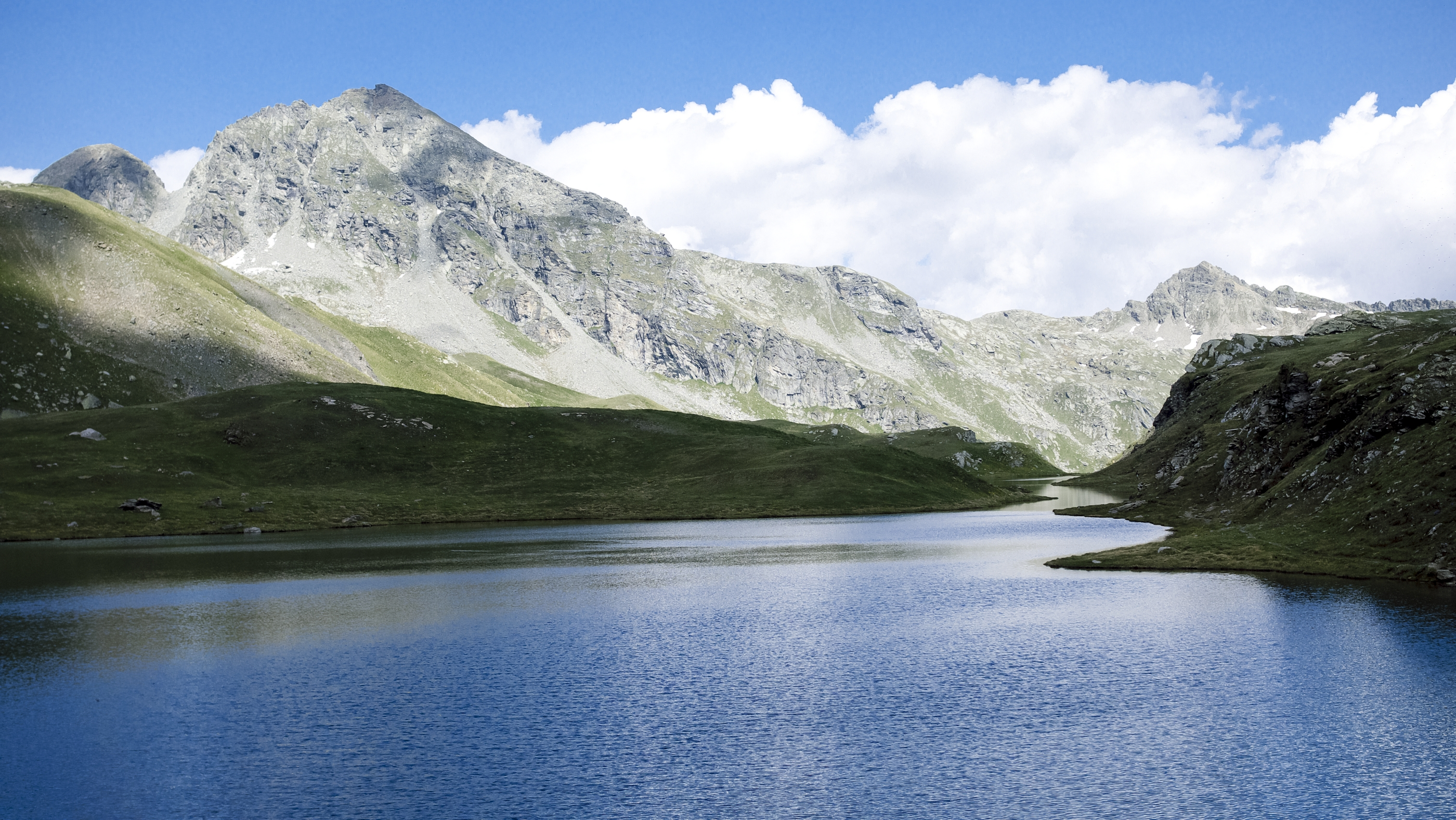
Lac de la Bataille (2,487 m [8,159 ft])

This path is known as the Itineraire des fromages (French for "Path of cheeses") and is linked to several mountain pastures. It starts in the car park at the beginning of the road before the ascent to the refuge. Continuing the climb and following the yellow signs indicating routes 5 and 6, the trail goes up one of the local ski slopes. After passing the chair lifts from Estoul and rejoining the gravel road, crossing the Chavanne Alp allows the entrance to the Palasinaz Valley.

==== Path: Lakes - Corno Bussola ====
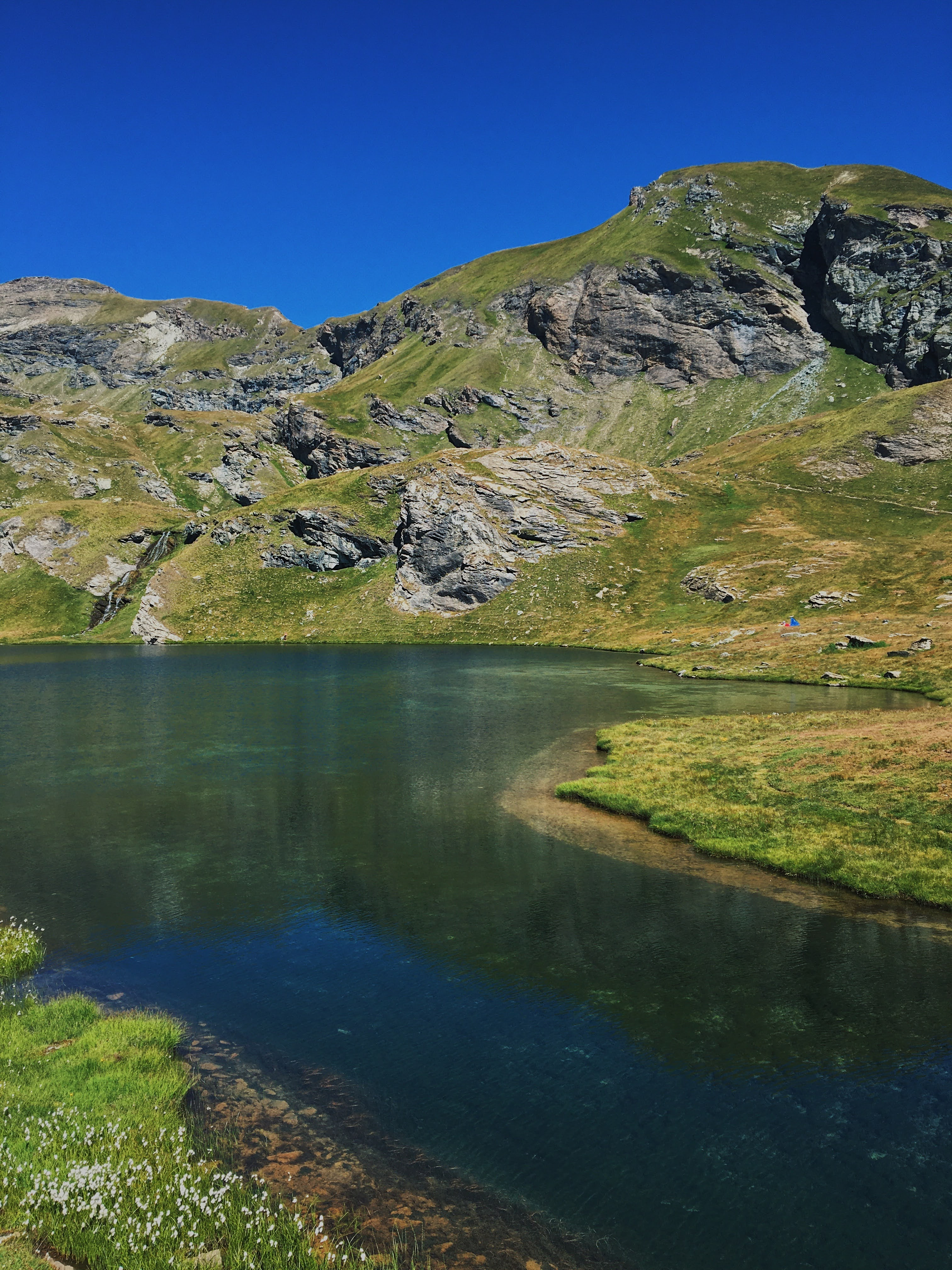
Lac Vert (2,485 m [8,153 ft])

A second bridge is reached along the northern shore of Lac de la Bataille. There is a small canal in correspondence with this bridge, which connects the previous lake with Lac Vert (2,485 m [8,153 ft]).

Following the main route, the trail continues to the right towards Lac du Colouir and the Palasinaz Pass. The less demanding variant heads straight for the Corno Bussola.

At 2,668 m (8,753 ft) above sea level, the Palasinaz Pass, which joins the Palasinaz with the Mascognaz valleys, the first encounters with ibexes can occur. Climbing towards the Corno Bussola, following the 3D trail that takes about an hour, Lac Potcha (2518 m) is reached. It is then possible to observe the steep ascent, which runs entirely along the ridge, leading to the next lake, Lac Long (2720 m).

This lake has deep blue waters and is dominated by the rocky walls of the Pointe du lac (2,816 m [9,239 ft]) and a crossroad joins the route to the one descending from the Corno Bussola. Here, the first stretches equipped with fixed ropes as handrails and metal steps commence, assisting hikers in proceeding on the path along an exposed ledge.

The route continues along the entire length of the crest, up to the destination. On the ridge it is possible to see edelweiss bushes, typical of high altitudes.

On the summit of the Corno Bussola (or Mont de Boussolaz, in French), the highest elevation in the area (3,022 m [9,915 ft]), there is a large metal cross made up of 24 cubic elements, at the base of which is the summit register. Trekkers can fill it in, leaving a message for future hikers. From the top it is also possible to view other important mountains such as the Matterhorn, Mont Blanc, Gran Paradiso, and many others.

== Curiosities (Bringuez Lake) ==
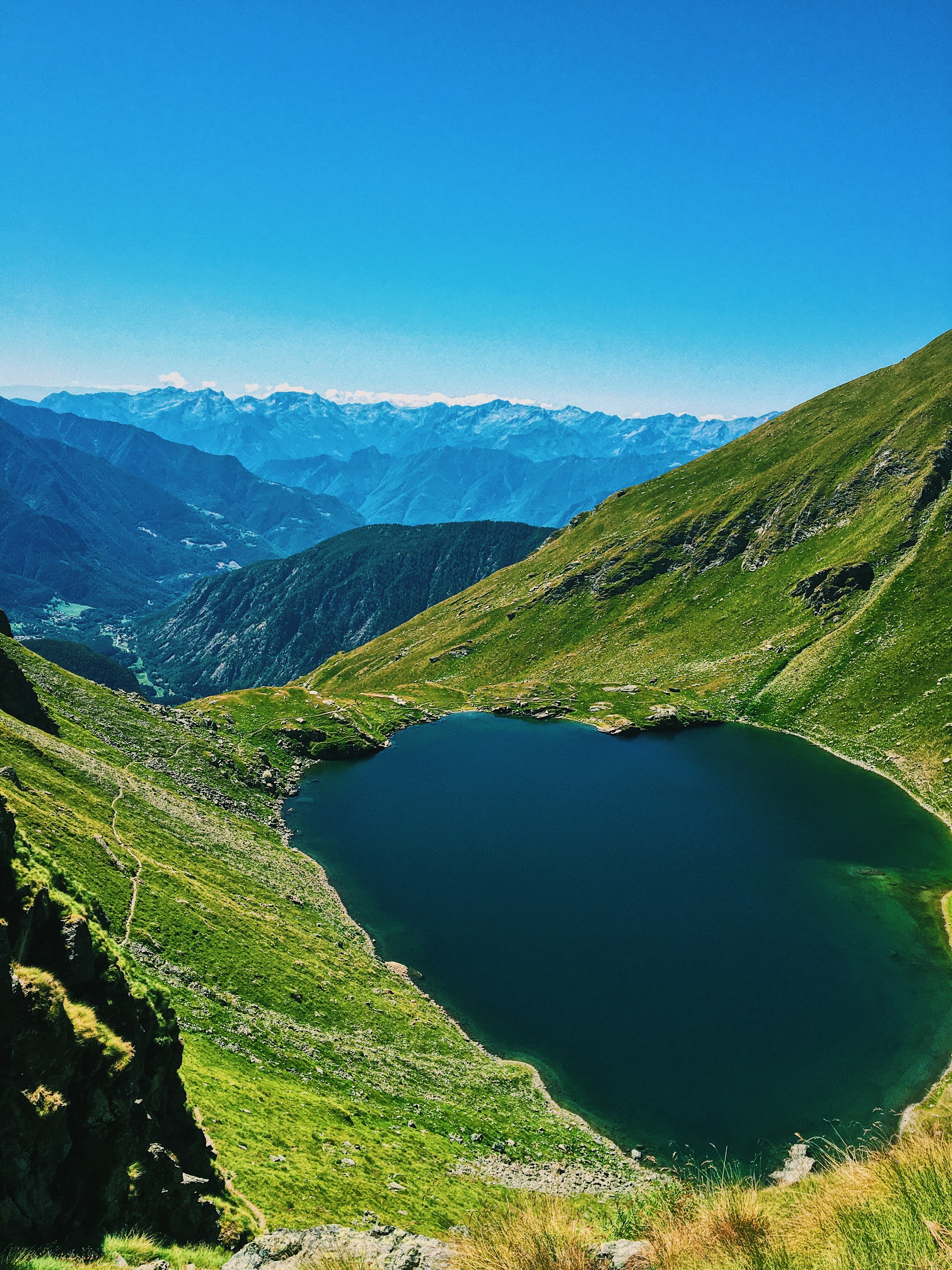
Bringuez Lake (2519 m)

In addition to the five main lakes, the nearby Bringuez Lake at an altitude of 2,519 m (8,264 ft), is located immediately to the east of Pointe Goà and to the west of Mont Quiapa. The "Bocchet" pass or Bringuez Pass (2,664m) - south-east of the Corno Bussola and immediately north of the lake - acts as a connection between the Palasinaz Lakes.

Situated at the bottom of a grassy hollow, enclosed by high rock walls, the lake is a deep basin of rather large dimensions. The latter is further accentuated by the steepness of the depression.

It is possible to reach Bringuez Lake by trail number 3, which starts 1,435 m (4,708 ft) above sea level, along the road between Brusson and Estoul, and reaches the lake in three to three and a half hours, climbing first to the village of Bringuez at 1,889 m (6,198 ft) above sea level before continuing to the Chavanne alpine pasture. However, it is a rather steep itinerary with a considerable difference in altitude. For this reason, it is not recommended to visit the area when weather warnings in the area are present, especially if there are southerly winds.

According to popular legends, the lake is also called The Black Lake of Bringuez and was known as one of the many "witches' lakes". Due to the almost vertical walls surrounding the lake and the particular exposure to the air from the south, violent thunderstorms can easily occur. These are caused by the warm and humid southerly currents that can condense and form clouds, rain and hail.

It is said that the lake was inhabited by witches with long hair, that would create clouds and hail, evidenced by the fact that sometimes hairs were found in the grains. A piglet was responsible for driving the storm over the cultivated fields, causing immense damage.

== Gallery ==
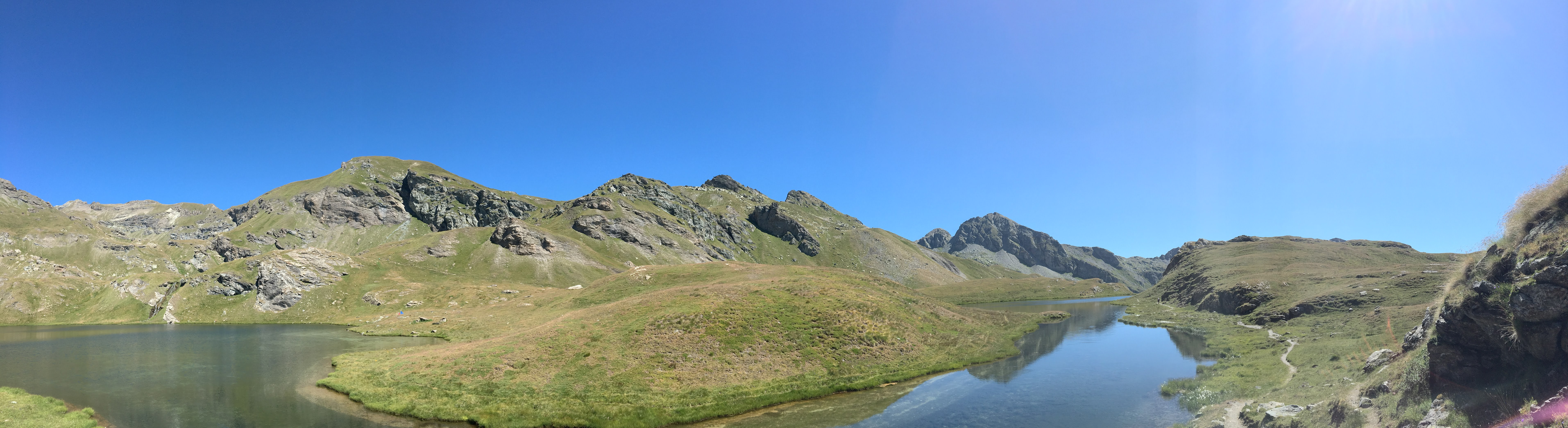
Connection between Lago della Battaglia and Lac Vert.

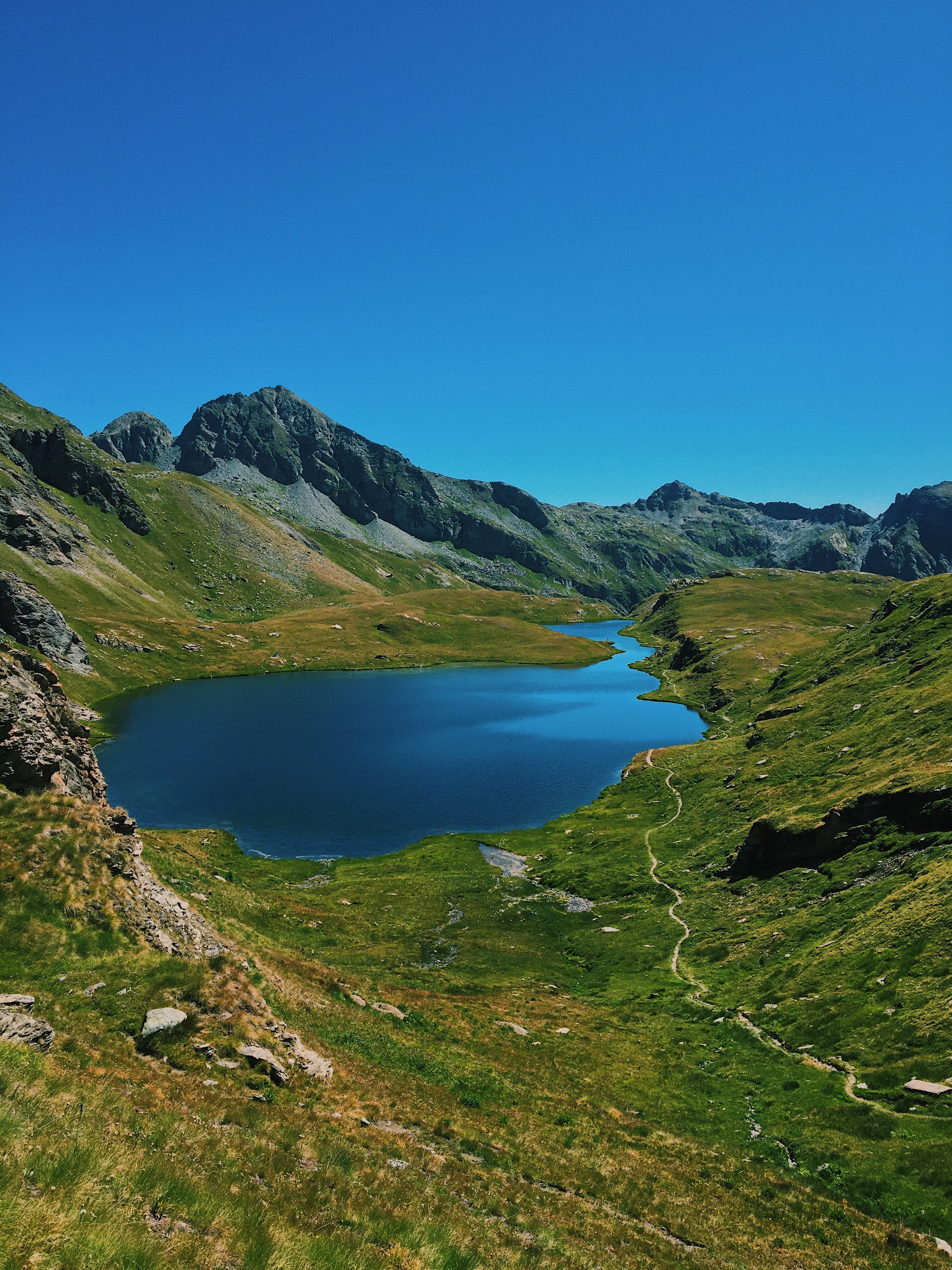
Lac Vert (2485 m), Val d'Ayas, Italy.

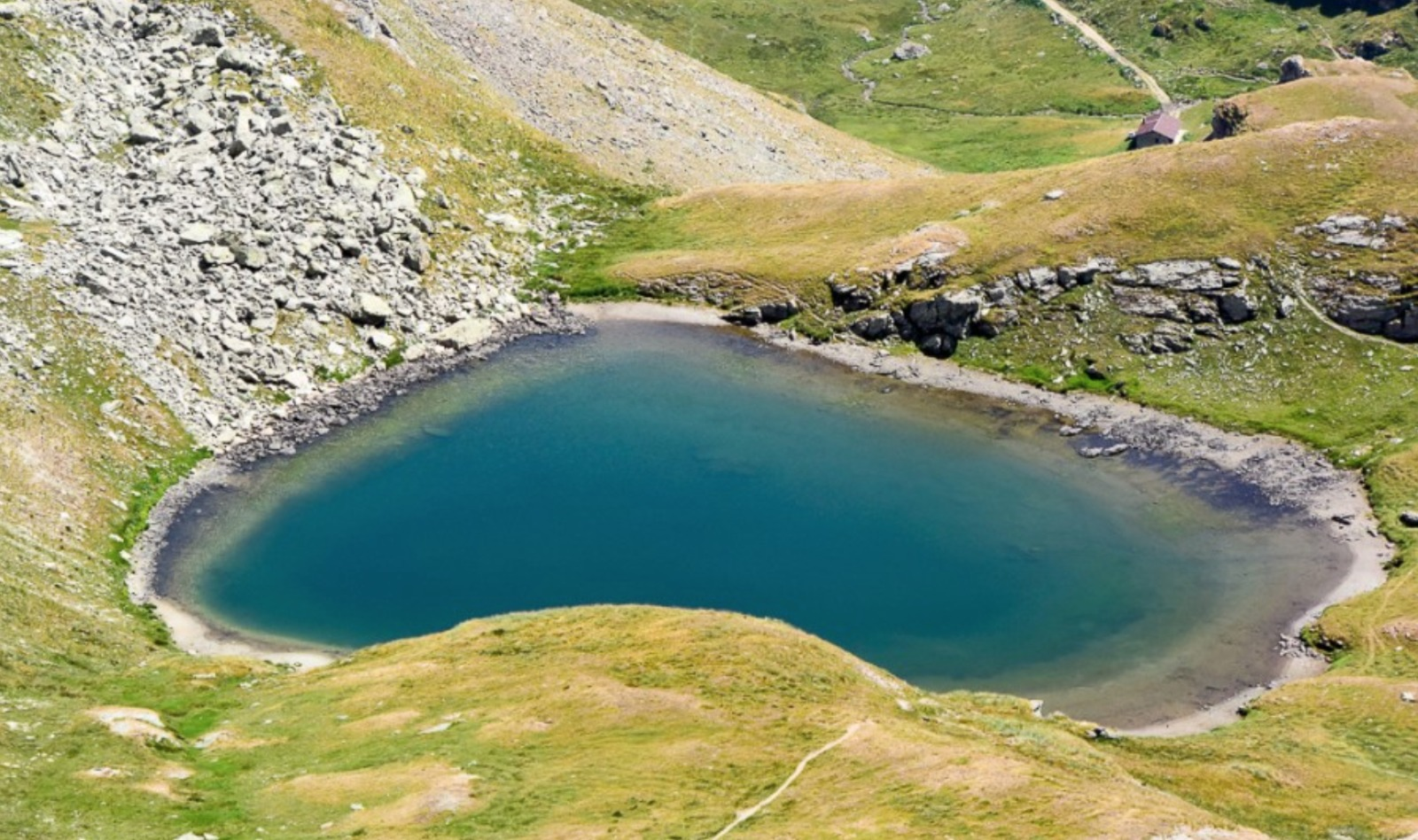
Lac du Couloir (2606 m)

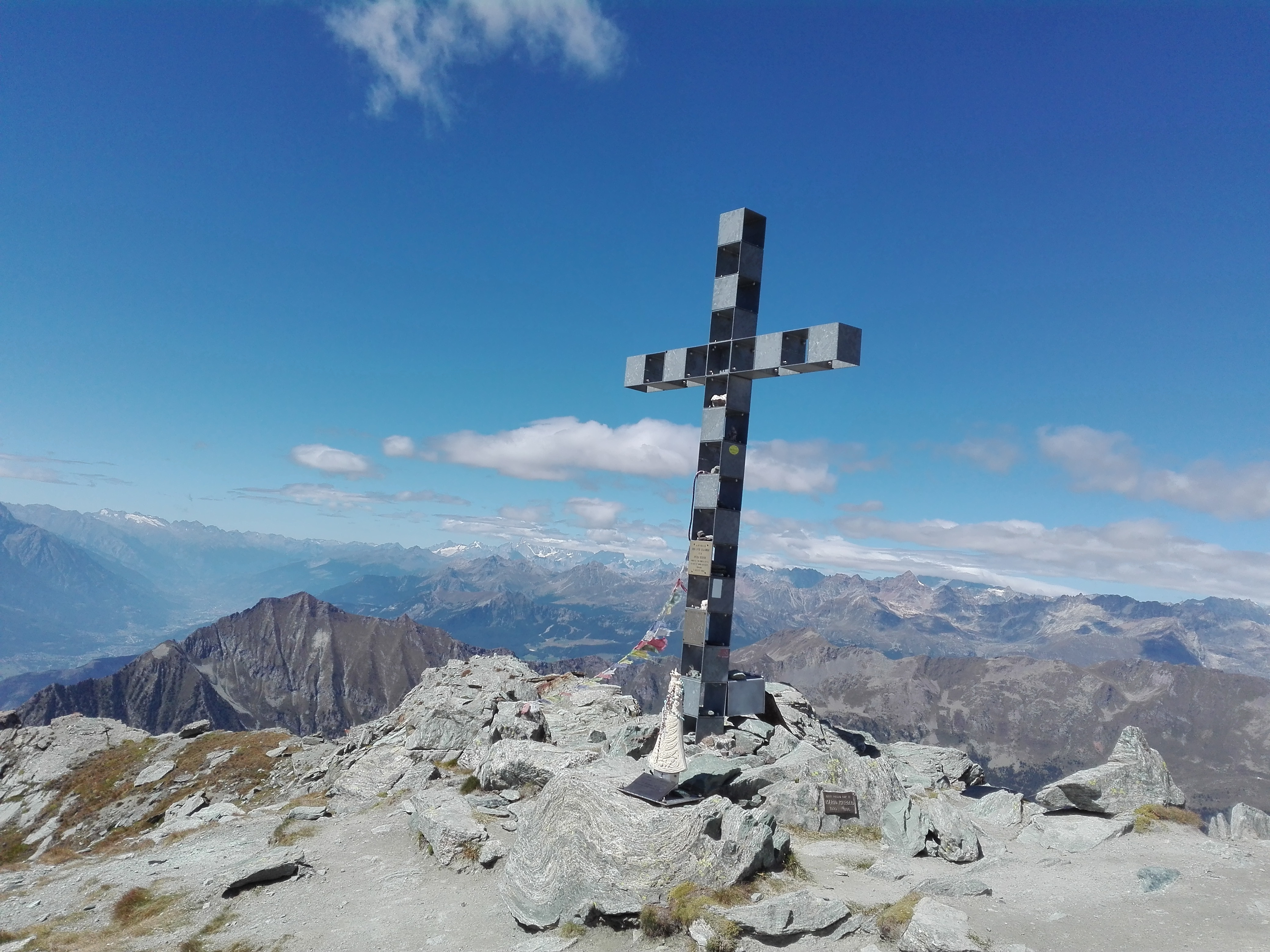
Corno Bussola (Mont de Boussolaz, 3022 m)

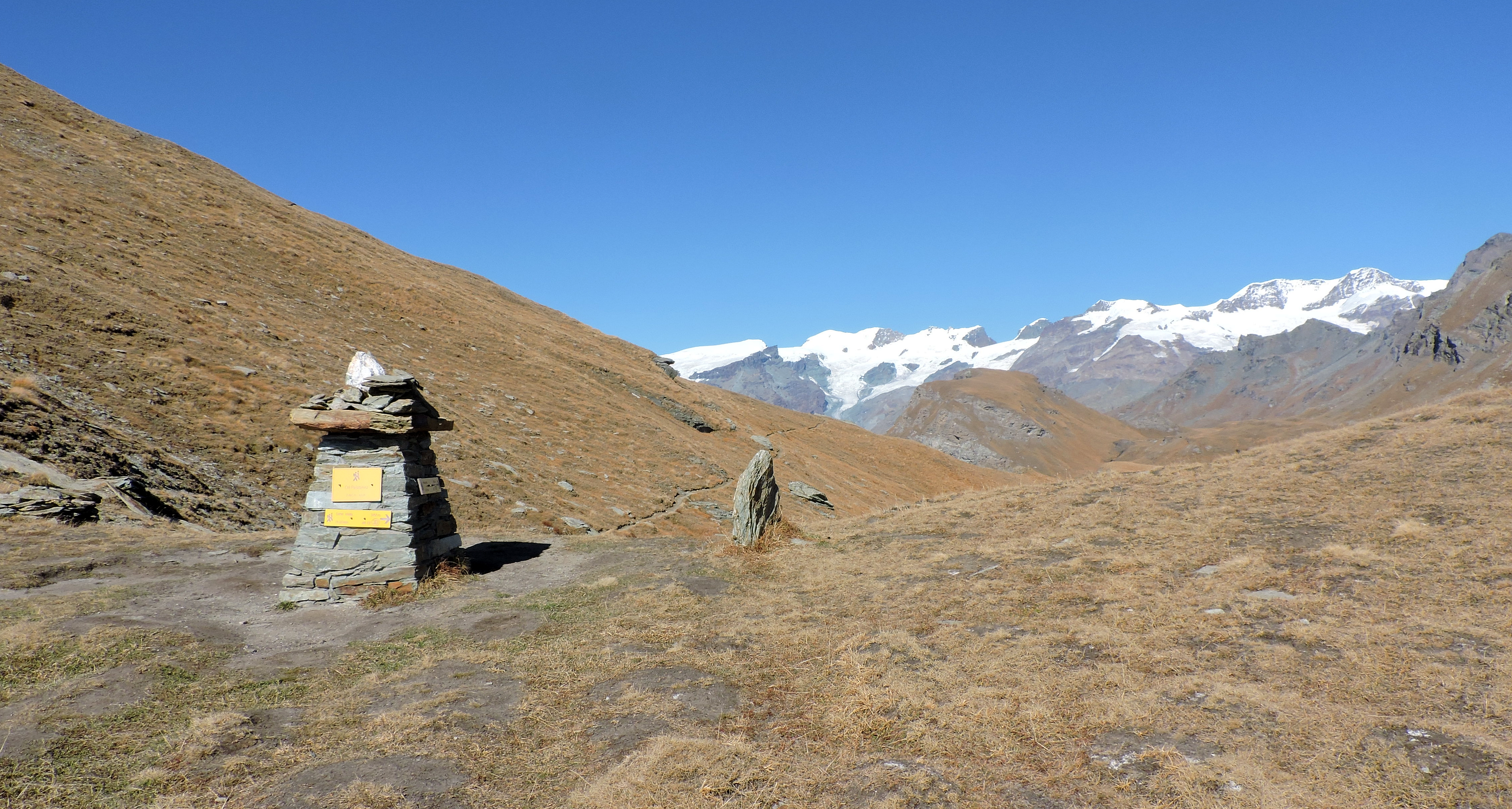
Palasinaz Peak top view from Estoul.

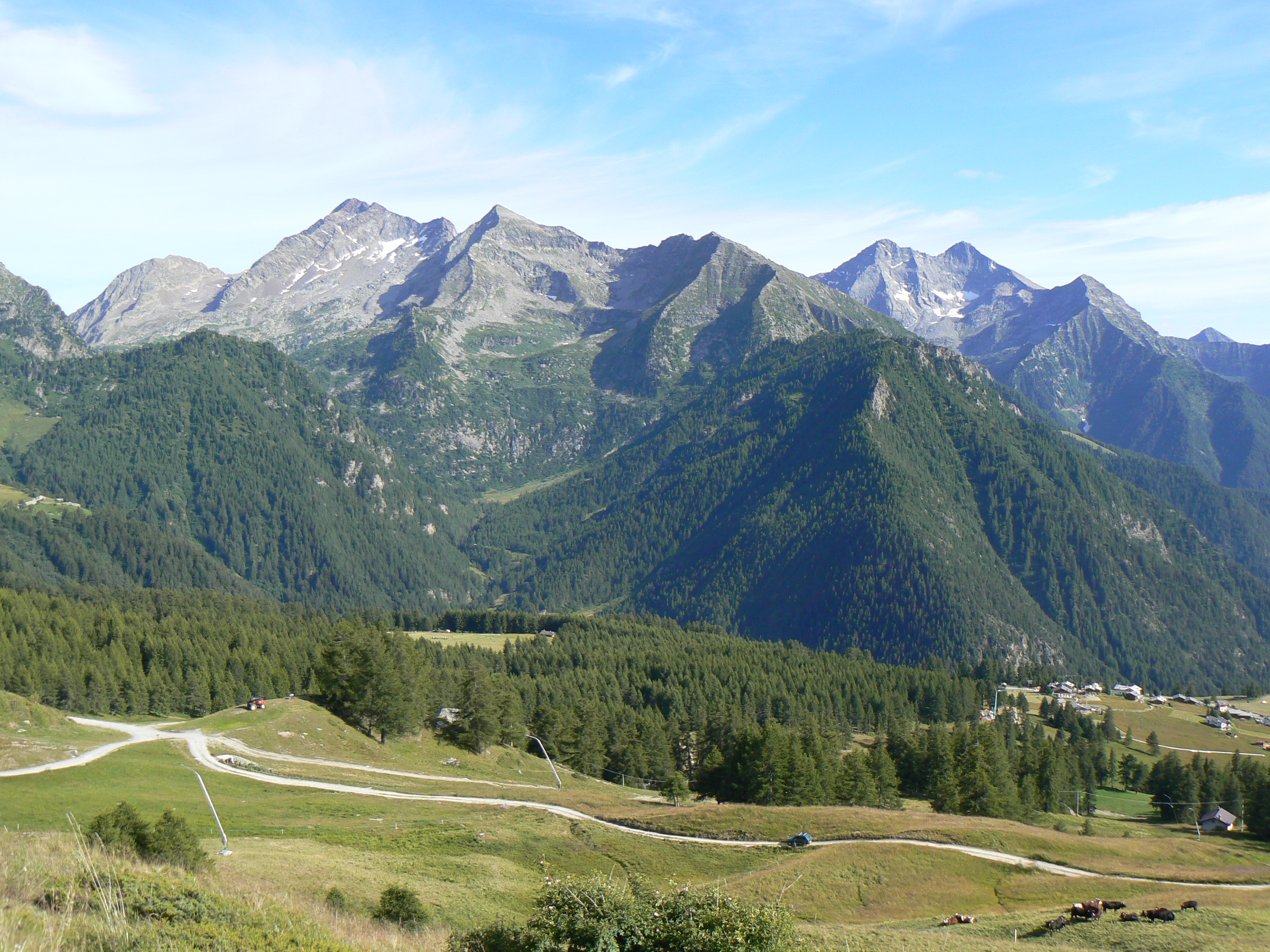
Estoul, start of the excursion to Refuge Arp.

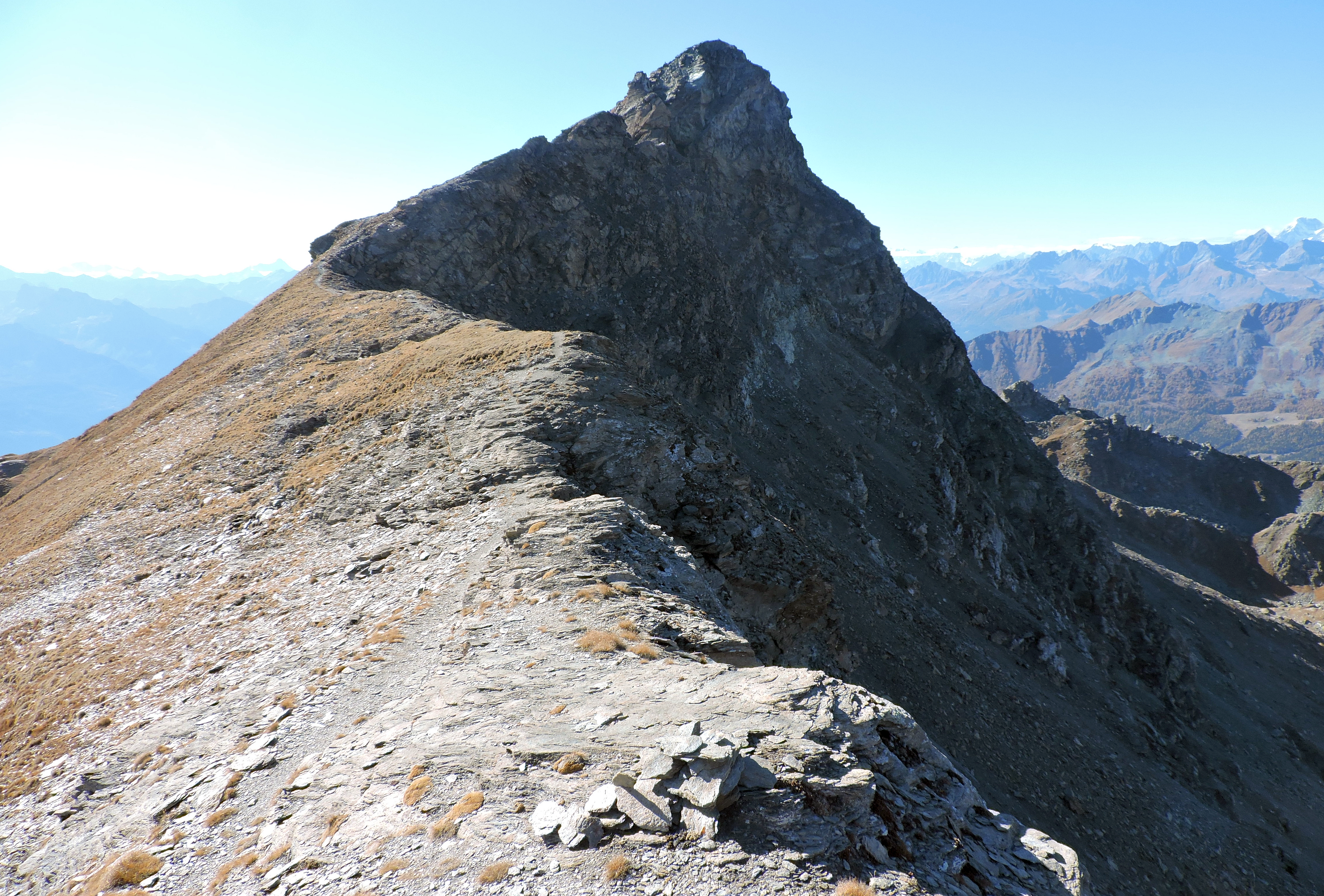
Corno Bussola ridge from the East

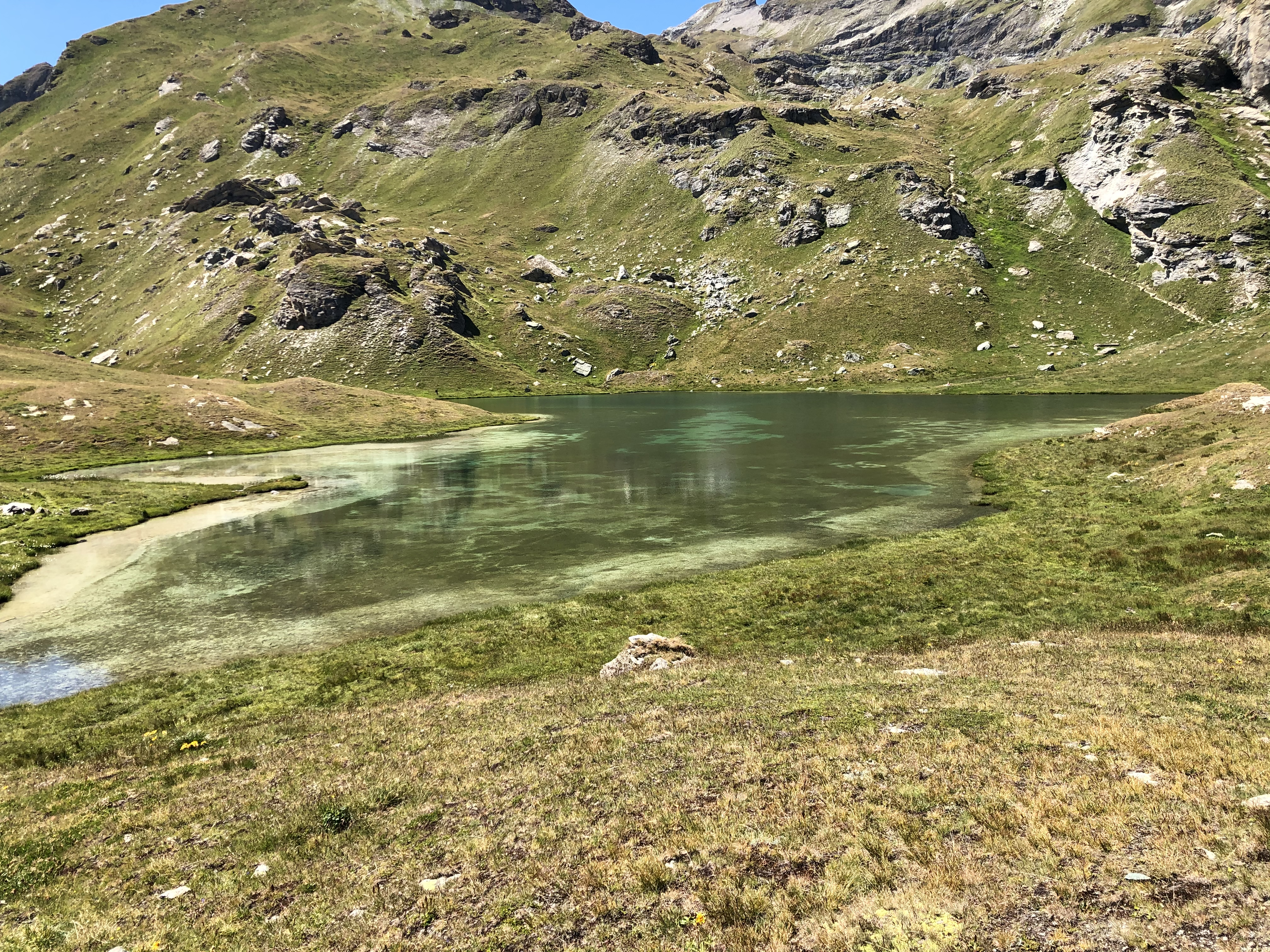
Lac Vert, seen from below

== See also ==
- Hiking
- Hiking equipment
- Climbing
- Aosta Valley
- Outdoor recreation
- Brusson
- Trekking
- Lakes of Italy
