= Bussola =

Bussola may refer to:

- Corno Bussola, mountain in the Italian Alps
- Dalla Bussola, album by Italian singer Mina
- Dionigi Bussola (1615–1687), Italian sculptor
