= Lake Perrin =

Glacial lake in Aosta Valley, Italy

Lake Perrin Lac Perrin
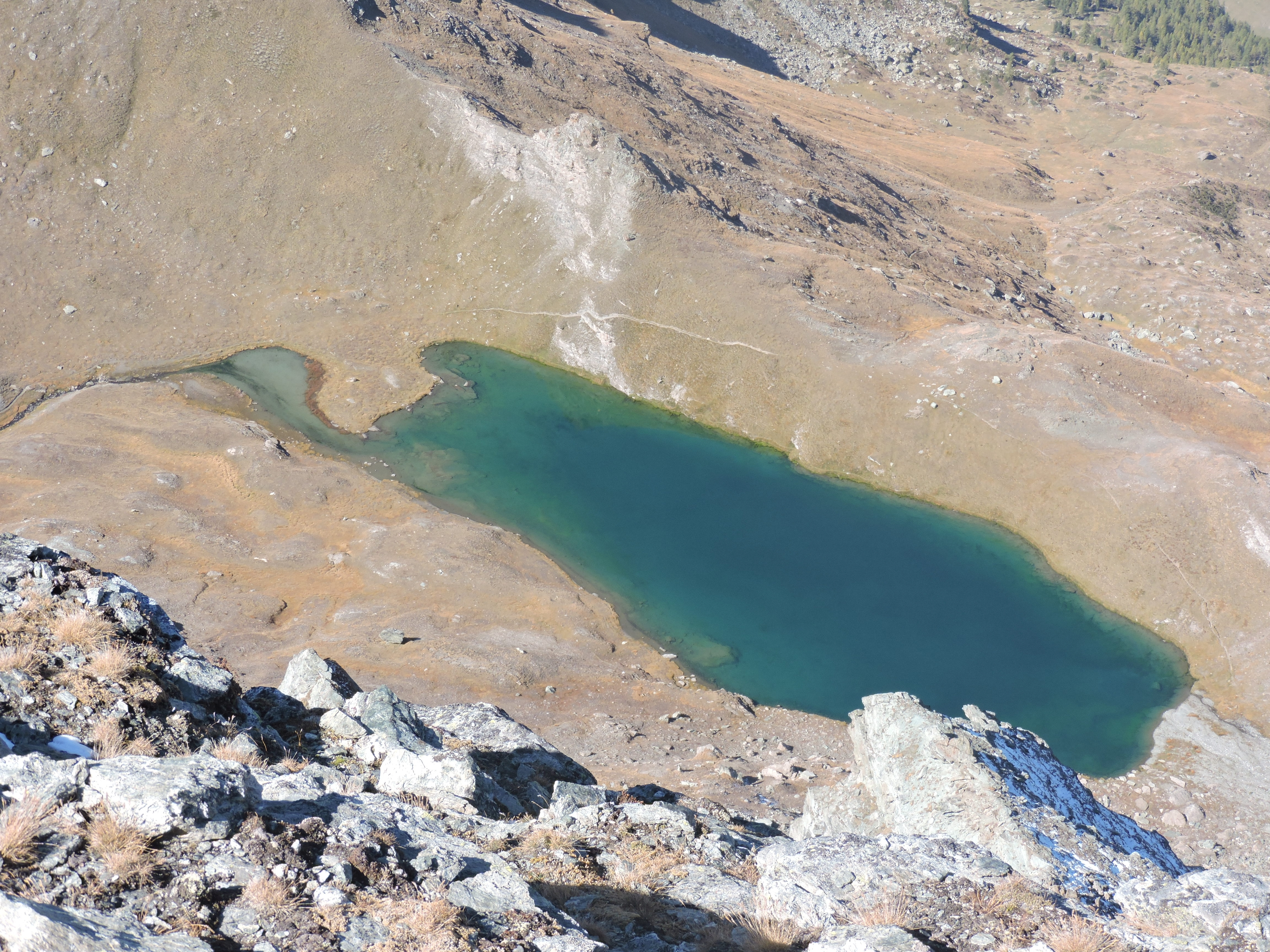
- The lake seen from Monte Perrin
- Interactive map of Lake Perrin; Lac Perrin
- Location: Ayas, Aosta Valley, Italy
- Coordinates: 45.81075°N 7.76623°E
- Type: Glacial
- Primary outflows: Mascognaz Stream
- Basin countries: Italy
- Surface area: 0.017 km^{2} (0.0066 sq mi)
- Surface elevation: 2,633.2 m (8,639 ft)
- Islands: None

The Lake Perrin (pronounced Fr. IPA: [peʁɛ̃] – Lac Perrin in French) at an elevation of 2,633.2 m a.s.l. is a natural lake of glacial origin located in the Ayas Valley.

== Characteristics ==
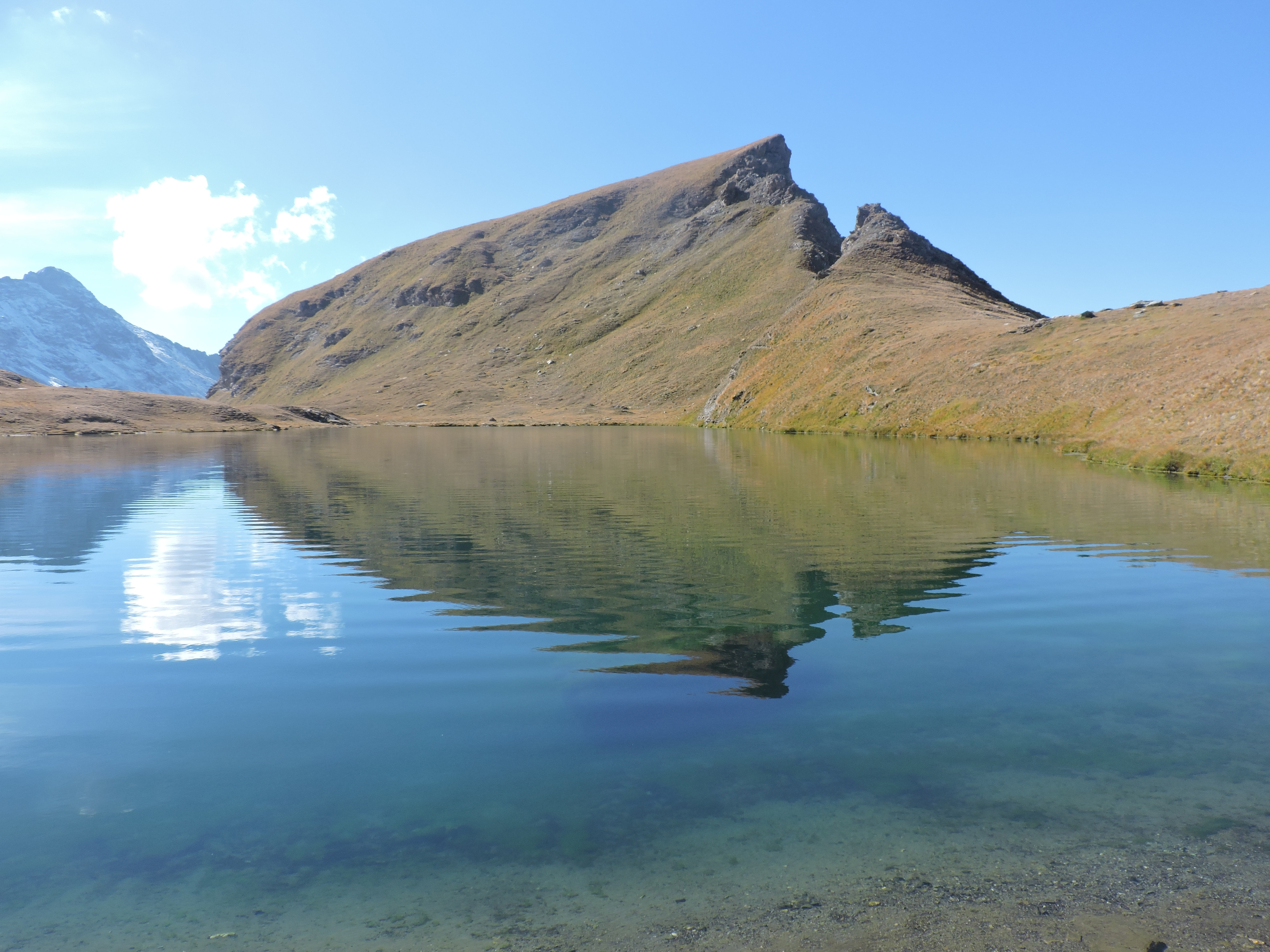
The lake's shores

The lake occupies a basin defined to the west by a steep grassy ridge at 2,771 m, to the northeast by the Grande Cime, and to the southeast by the Mont Perrin., whose rocky northwestern slope looms over the water surface. The Mascognaz stream originates from the lake, a tributary of the Évançon. It is fed by surrounding snowfields. The waters host significant fish fauna, and the shores are bordered by cotton grass

== Access ==
The lake can be reached via a marked trail starting from Champoluc, passing through either the Mascognaz valley or the Cunéaz stream valley, allowing for an interesting loop hike for those who take one trail up and the other down. Due to the pristine nature of the area, the lake is considered of notable scenic value. From the lake, one can continue toward the Grande Cime or the Mont Perrin.

== Bibliography ==
- Berutto, Giuilio (1996). Cervino - Matterhorn e Monte Rosa [Cervino - Matterhorn and Monte Rosa] (in Italian). Turin: IGC.

=== Cartography ===
- "Cartografia ufficiale italiana" [Official Italian Cartography] (in Italian). Istituto Geografico Militare. in scales 1:25,000 and 1:100,000, available online
- Carta dei sentieri e dei rifugi [Map of Trails and Refuges] (in Italian). Turin: Istituto Geografico Centrale.
