= Corno Bussola =

Mountain in Italy

- Mont de Boussolaz
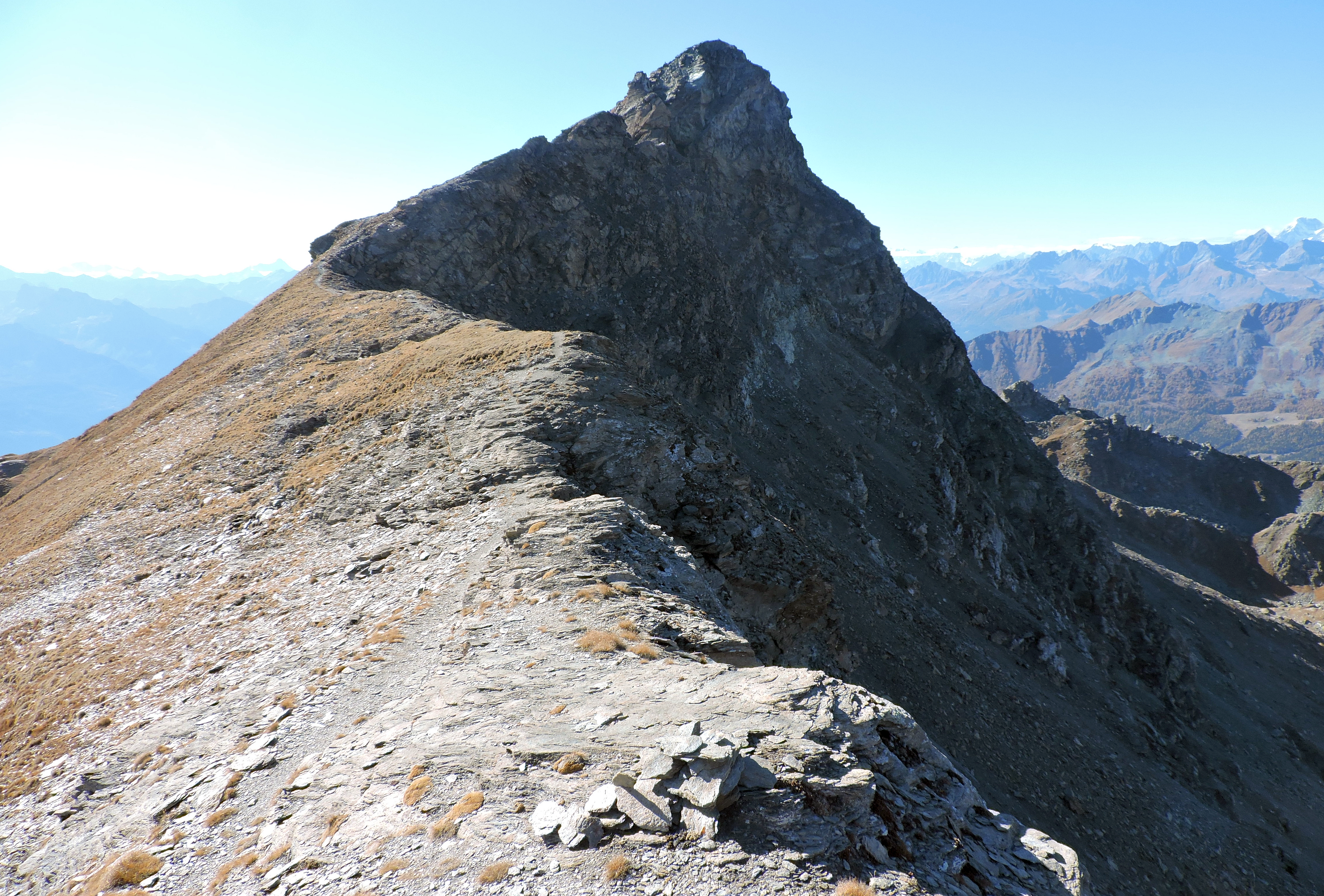
- East view of the Corno Bussola

Highest point
- Elevation: 3,023 m (9,918 ft)
- Prominence: 355 m (1,165 ft)Key col: Palasinaz Pass (2668 m)
- Isolation: 4.13 km (2.57 mi)
- Listing: Alpine mountains above 3000 m
- Coordinates: 45°47′44″N 7°44′11″E

Geography
- Location within Alps
- Location: Aosta Valley, Italy
- Parent range: Pennine Alps

Climbing
- Easiest route: Hike

Corno Bussola (French: Mont de Boussolaz) is a 3,023 metres high peak on the Italian side of the Pennine Alps.

== Toponymy ==
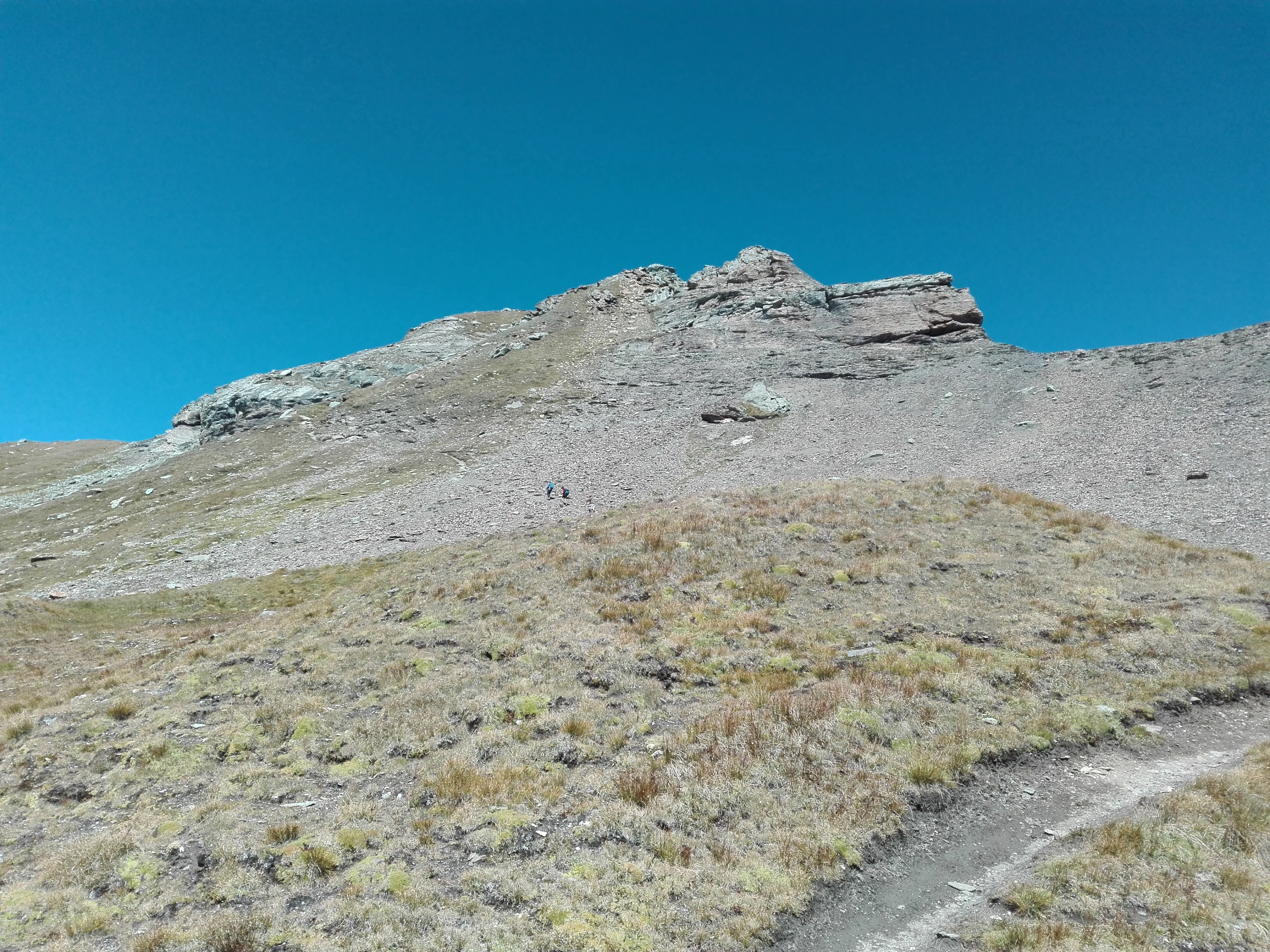
Southern slopes.

In Italian corno means horn, a term which often appears in toponymy with the meaning of peak, summit. Bussola means compass, but the original name of the mountain in the Valdôtain dialect has no relations with the compass, and its pronunciation is different too (not bùssola as in Italian but bussòla).

The French toponym shows a typical phonetical phenomenon in the French-speaking Alps, that is to say the mute final 'z'.

== Geography ==
Corno Bussola is located in the Ayas valley and is the main elevation of the ridge dividing two small valleys tributaries of the Évançon: Mascognaz valley (north) and Conca di Palasinaz or Combe de Palasinaz. The lowest point of the ridge, which connects Corno Bussola to the neighbouring Corno Vitello (or Chalberhòre in Walser German), is the Palasinaz Pass (2,688 m). Administratively the mountain belongs to the comunes of Ayas and Brusson.

Just below the Corno Bussola there is the natural environment of the Palasinaz Lakes.

=== SOIUSA classification ===
According to SOIUSA (International Standardized Mountain Subdivision of the Alps) the mountain can be classified in the following way:

- main part = Western Alps
- major sector = North Western Alps
- section = Pennine Alps
- subsection = Monte Rosa Alps
- supergroup = Costiera Testa Grigia-Frudiera
- group = Costiera della Testa Grigia
- code = I/B-9.III-B.5.a

== Access to the summit ==
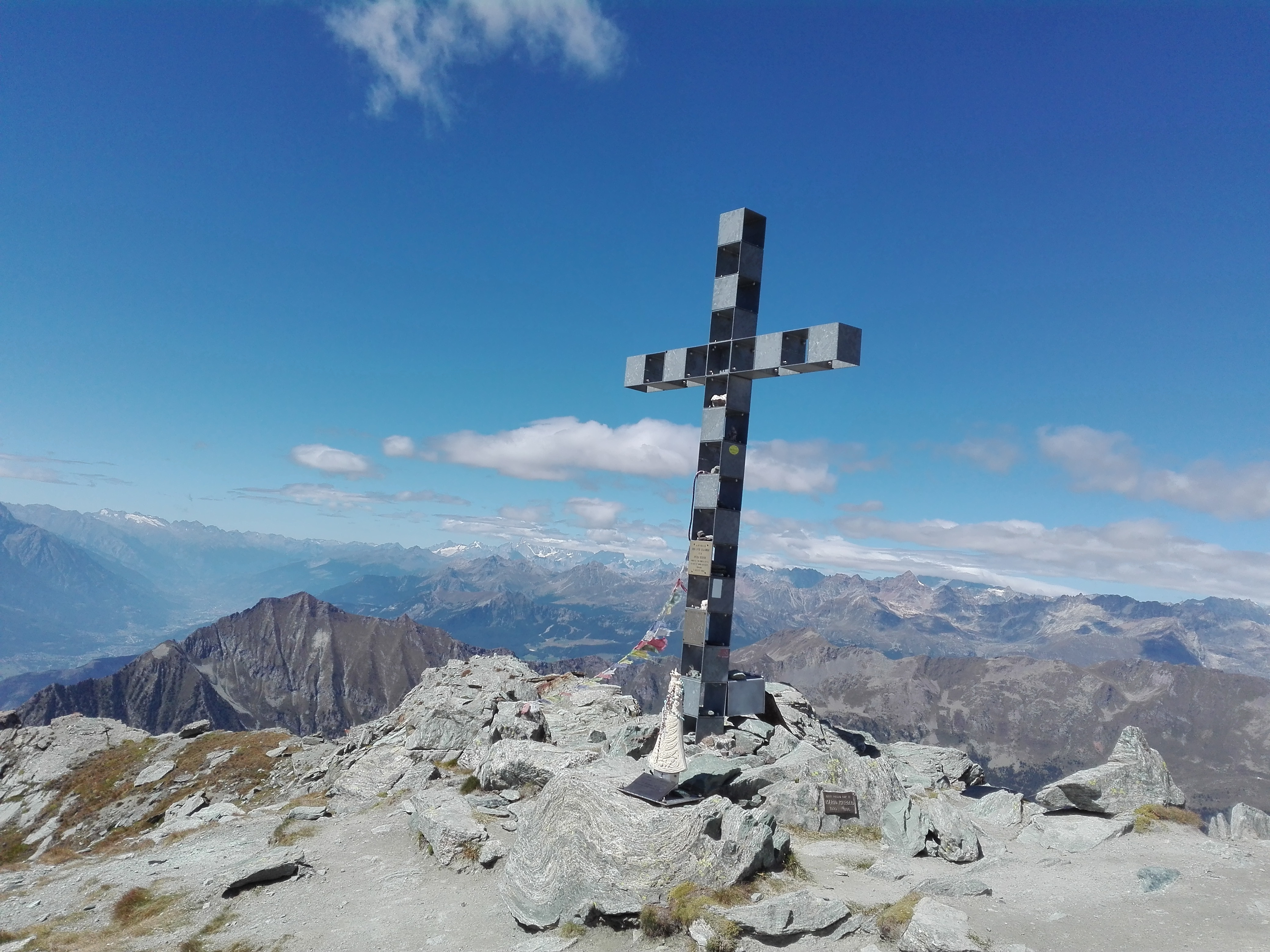
Summit cross.

The summit can be accessed starting from the Arp Hut and following a waymarked footpath which flanks some lakes (Palasinaz lake) and then reaches a pass at 2,805 m (Colletto Bussola or Petit col de Boussolaz), and then leads to the summit climbing its southern flanks. The route requires some hiking experience From the top of the mountain, where stands a high metallic summit cross, one can enjoy a broad panoramic view encompassing some oth the highest mountains of Western Alps such as Breithorn, Castor, Pollux, Liskamm, Dufourspitze, Testa Grigia, Matterhorn, Corno Bianco and, in the distance, Monviso, Gran Paradiso, Mont Blanc and Grand Combin.

=== Mountain huts ===
- Rifugio Arp (2,446 m).

== Maps ==
- Military Geographic Institute (IGM) official maps of Italy, 1:25.000 and 1:100.000 scale, on-line version
- Carta dei sentieri e dei rifugi scala 1:50.000 n. 5 Cervino e Monte Rosa, Istituto Geografico Centrale - Torino
