= Champoluc =

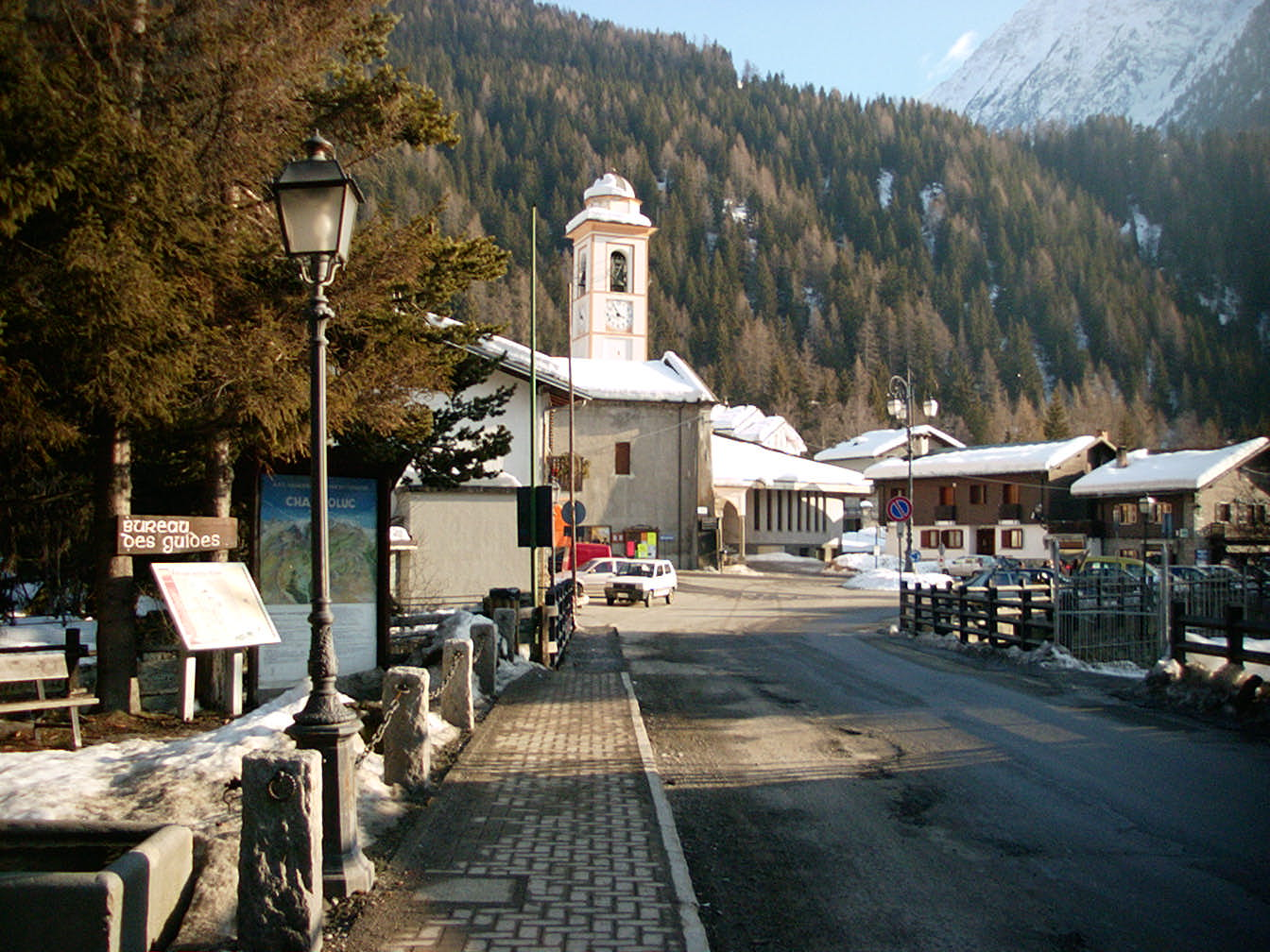
- Rue des Guides
- Interactive map of Champoluc
- Coordinates: 45°50′N 7°44′E
- Country: Italy
- Province: Aosta Valley
- Commune: Ayas

Area
  - Total: 3.45 km^{2} (1.33 sq mi)
- Elevation: 1,560 m (5,120 ft)

Population (2010)
  - Total: 500
- Postal code: 11020
- Area code: 0125

Champoluc (French: [ʃɑ̃pɔlyk]) is a village in the commune of Ayas, in the Aosta Valley, Northern Italy.

The area is known as a centre for hiking, mountaineering and skiing, particularly around the Monte Rosa Massif.

== Geography ==
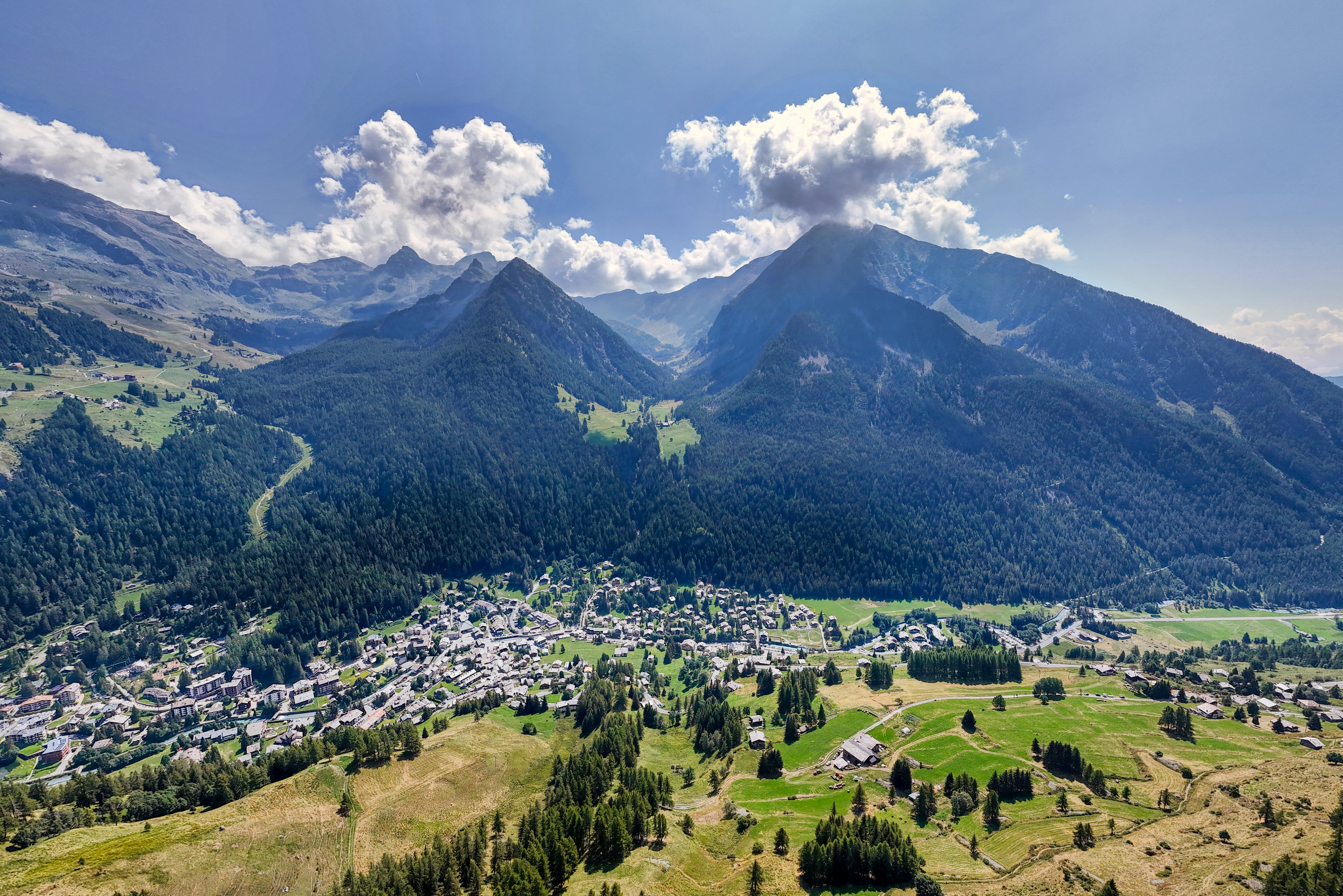
Champoluc

It is one of the 3 main villages in the commune of Ayas, together with Antagnod (where the town hall is located) and Saint-Jacques-des-Allemands. It lies at an altitude of 1568 metres in a broad flat part of the upper Ayas valley. Above Champoluc, to the East, is the Plan du Crest (1975 meters), one of the largest ski areas in the Aosta Valley, reachable by cable car from the centre of the village. In summer, the Crest is a popular place for hiking.

== Climate ==
The climate is quite cold in winter (with minima around -15 ° / -20 °C). The rainfall is low. In spring and summer, temperatures rise remarkably, with peaks of 20 ° / 22 °C and the wind is more frequent. Summer is short, with autumn starting in September, accompanied by drier days and lower temperatures.

== Tourism and economy ==
Champoluc is a well-known ski resort, part of the Monterosa Ski area which connects the upper reaches of the valleys of Ayas, Lys and the Valsesia (the latter is located in Piedmont). The highest point of the Champoluc skiing area is the Bätt Pass at 2,676 metres (8,780 ft), where lifts and runs allow connection to the Lys Valley and to Gressoney-La-Trinité. Champoluc is the largest resort in the Monterosa area with great glacier views and wide variety of off-piste.

Summer tourism is also a significant source of income in the area, with many hiking trails in the Monte Rosa Massif.

== History and culture ==
Champoluc and the whole upper Ayas Valley was inhabited by Walsers during their migrations. Traces of their culture are still evident. Locally this part of the valley is called Canton des Allemands (French for "Germans' Canton").
