= Ayas, Aosta Valley =

Ayas Ayâs/Ayah (Valdôtain) Ajats (Walser)
- Comune
- Comune di Ayas; Commune d'Ayas
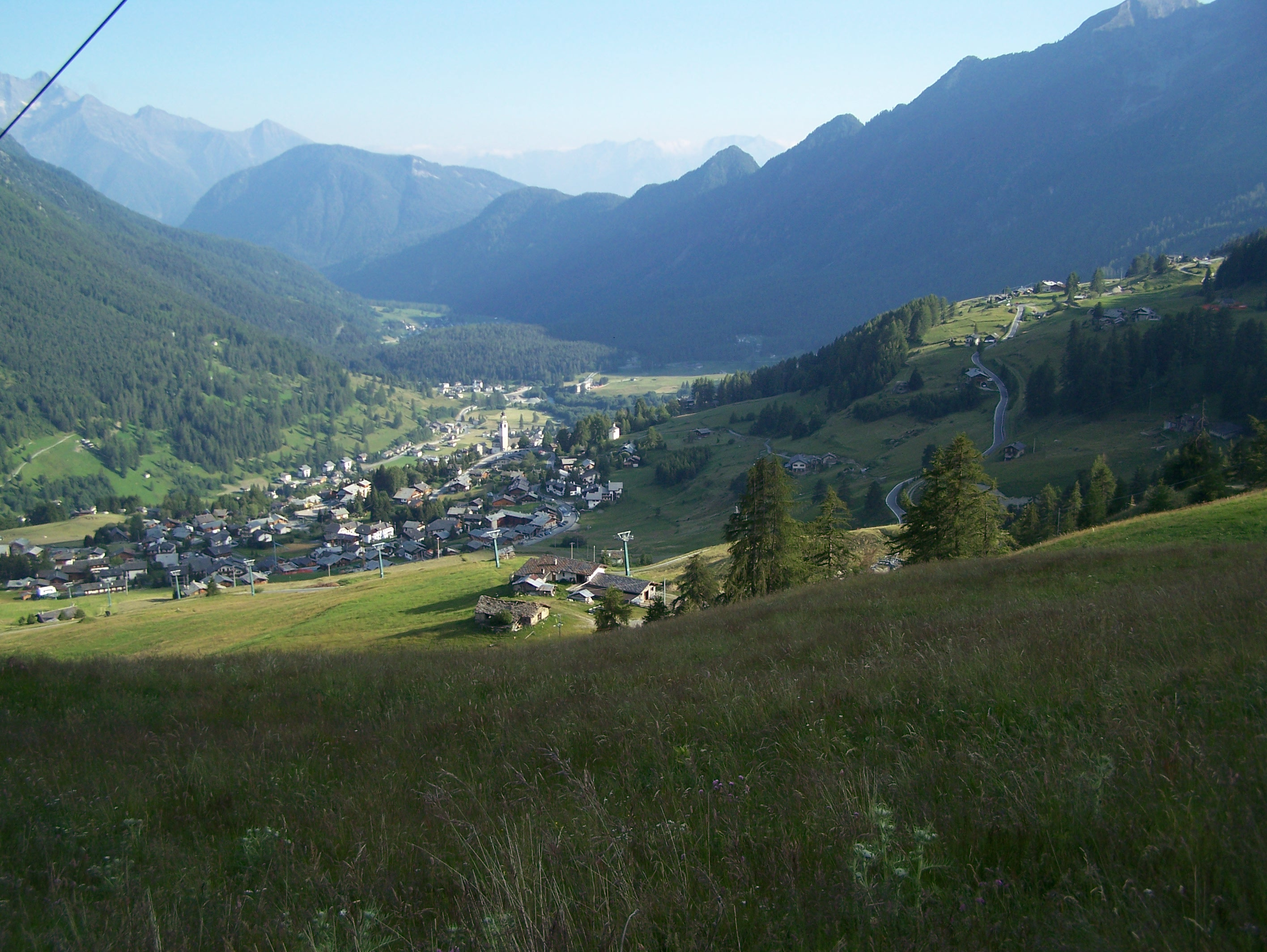
- View of Antagnod

- Coat of arms

- Location within Italy Location within Aosta Valley
- Coordinates: 45°49′N 7°41′E
- Country: Italy
- Region: Aosta Valley
- Province: none
- Frazioni: Antagnod, Arpeillaz, La Barmaz, Barmasc, Bisous, Blanchard, Le Bochoney, Borbey, Bossoulaz, Brenguey, Le Brusal, Champlan, Champoluc, Le Collet, Contenéry, Corbet, Corneuil, Le Cornu, Le Cortot, Crestérésat, Le Crest, Crest-Forné, La Croisettaz, La Croix, Les Croües, Cunéaz, Les Droles, Estoul, Èriu, Les Fiéry, La Fourcaz-Dessus, La Fourcaz-Dessous, La Fourcaz, Le Frachey, France, Les Fusines, Les Gavines, Les Goïls-Dessus, Les Goïls-Dessous, Le Grand Tournalin, Granaz, Les Grangettes, Granon, Le Lac-Vert, Lasertaz, Le Lavassey-Dessus, Le Lavassey, Lignod, Lillaz, Lunasc, Magnéaz, Magnéchoulaz, Mandrou, Mascognaz, Massuquin, Le Mase, Messan, Messanet, Meytéres, La Moléraz, Le Moulin-de-Po, Nanaz-Dessus, NanazDessous, Le Néal-Dessus, Le Néal-Dessous, L’Osel, L’Olivaz, Ostafaz-Dessus, Ostafaz-Dessous, Palenc, Palouettaz, Palud, Périasc-d’Aval, Périasc, Le Lac-de-Perrin, Les Péyoz, Le Pian-de-la Sal, Le Pian-de-Chanchavellat, Pian-Long, Pian-Péraz, Pianes, Pieit, Pilaz, Le Pillonet, Portolaz, Praz-Sec, Praé, Pracharbon, Ramére-Dessus, Ramére-Dessous, Les Ramey, Le Rangassey, Ravére-Dessus, Ravére-Dessous, Résy, Revé, Rollin, La Rongéaz, Rovinal, Sachiel, Saint-Jacques-des-Allemands, Saler, Salerin, Soudat, Soussun, Taconet, Le Tantané, Tavélaz, Charchérioz-Dessus, Charchérioz-Dessous, Les Charvalines, Les Chavannes, La Cuccaz, Le Tournalin-Dessus, Le Tournalin-Dessous, Le Trochey, Cères, Les Cimes-Blanches, Les Vagères, Vascochaz, La Vardaz, Vachères, Le Vasé, La Ventinaz, Verraz-Dessus, Verraz-Dessous, Véret, Le Vieil, Les Villy

Area
  - Total: 129.42 km^{2} (49.97 sq mi)
- Elevation: 1,698 m (5,571 ft)

Population (31 December 2022)
  - Total: 1,357
  - Density: 10.49/km^{2} (27.16/sq mi)
- Demonym: Ayassins
- Time zone: UTC+1 (CET)
  - Summer (DST): UTC+2 (CEST)
- Postal code: 11020
- Dialing code: 0125
- Patron saint: Martin of Tours
- Saint day: 11 November
- Website: Official website

Ayas French pronunciation (Arpitan: Ayâs or Ayah; Gressoney Walser: Ajats; Aiàs between 1939 and 1945) is a comune sparso in the Aosta Valley region of northwestern Italy, with 1359 inhabitants in 2010.

== Geography ==
It is made up of several frazioni (locally officially called hameaux, in French), the two major ones being Antagnod which holds the town hall and the main parish, and Champoluc. All the frazioni of Ayas were combined under the one jurisdictional parish of Saint-Martin d'Antagnod in 1761. They remained combined in this way until the new parish of Sainte-Anne of Champoluc was built in 1946. The comune of Ayas lies up the Ayas valley from Brusson.

=== Physical geography ===
The comune of Ayas occupies the upper part of the homonymous valley at the feet of the great peaks of the Pennine Alps, which separate it from Zermatt in the Mattertal (Switzerland) and mark the border between Italy and Switzerland. The most notable of these peaks are Castor (4,226 m), Pollux (4,091 m) and the Breithorn (4,165 m).

Another important glacier is the Grand Glacier of Verra. It is the principal source of the Évançon, which flows down the Val d'Ayas and empties into the Dora Baltea (French: Doire baltée).

In the opposite direction from the Monte Rosa Massif is Dzerbion, a 2,720 metre mountain in the shape of a pyramid, which separated the comune of Ayas from that of Saint-Vincent.

- Seismic classification: zone 4 (very low seismicity)

=== Flora and fauna ===
With respect to flora, the landscape of Ayas is dominated by various species of Alpine plant, such as the cowberry (Vaccinium vitis-idaea), the gentian (Gentiana acaulis) and the spring pasque flower (Pulsatilla vernalis). The main trees in the woods are the European spruce (Picea abies), the Swiss pine (Pinus cembra) and the European larch (Larix decidua).

The fauna which inhabits the area of Ayas is very varied too. There are marmots in the remote parts of the territory, squirrels and foxes in the woods, and golden eagles in the sky. The rivers and lakes are characterised by freshwater fish, like the marble trout.

== History ==
The Latin name is Agatius which seems to be the name of the first Roman colony. However, the etymology of the name is uncertain - there are many opinions. For example, Ayas could be cognate with the river Ayasse in the Champorcher Valley, deriving from the Latin adjective aquatica. Another theory is that it might derive from giàs, Piedmontese for "livestock pen".

As for the earliest human settlement in the valley, it is thought that Ayas was initially populated by the Salassi. These people practiced agriculture, pastoralism, hunting and fishing up to the Roman conquest in around 25 BC. The Val d'Ayas became an important route to other territories of the Empire. Later this role was consolidated and the connections with Valais were expanded. As a result of these connections, Ayas later became known as Krämertal (Merchant Valley).

Around 515, the territory of Ayas became part of the fief controlled by the monks of Saint-Maurice d'Agaune, of Burgundian origin. This group imposed Christianity on the peasantry of Ayas. This is the period when the first churches were built and the roads connecting the villages were expanded. Later the control of the Church over Ayas was strengthened, until the Pope gave total control of the valley to the Bishop of Aosta, Aymon of Quart in a Papal bull of 1776.

At the same time as the arrival of the Burgundians in the sixth century, came a migration of Walsers (a group of Germanic origin) into the valley, in particular to Saint-Jacques which is locally known as the Canton des Allemands (French for "Canton of the Germans"). A second migration occurred in the twelfth century. This migration has left traces in the architecture, which is similar to that of Valais and of the upper Lys Valley, and in the language of the upper val d'Ayas, which is very different from the other varieties of Valdôtain in phonology and vocabulary.

Around 1200 the land of the family of Graines, which then controlled Ayas, was sold to the Challant family, viscounts of Aosta. A good portion of the val d'Ayas thus came into the possession of the Challant family and received the name "Vallée de Challant-Ayas". However the valley was not completely controlled by this powerful feudal family - the Abbey of St Maurice had ultimate sovereignty over the land. The Challant family governed the Val d'Ayas until the eighteenth century when their weakened members lost control of it. Thereafter the valley became part of the Duchy of Savoy and was administered by the church, which controlled many parishes along the whole valley.

Like all the other comuni of the Aosta Valley, Ayas suffered from high emigration at the end of the nineteenth and beginning of the twentieth centuries. The main destinations were France and Switzerland.

During the two world wars, many men of Ayas were conscripted into the armed forces. In the fascist period, a hostile attitude developed towards the regime and in 1944 a small partisan action took place. The Germans also came to Ayas. In 1939 the place name was Italianised as "Aiàs".

After the wars there was an economic revival as a result of tourist activities in Ayas, which led to the construction of hotels, houses, streets and to economic changes.

== Monuments and locations of interest ==
=== Religious architecture ===
The Val d'Ayas has been strongly influenced by the Church in the course of its history. Thus, today, it contains more than twenty religious buildings, including churches, chapels, sanctuaries, grottoes and shrines all painted and connected to particular artistic genres.

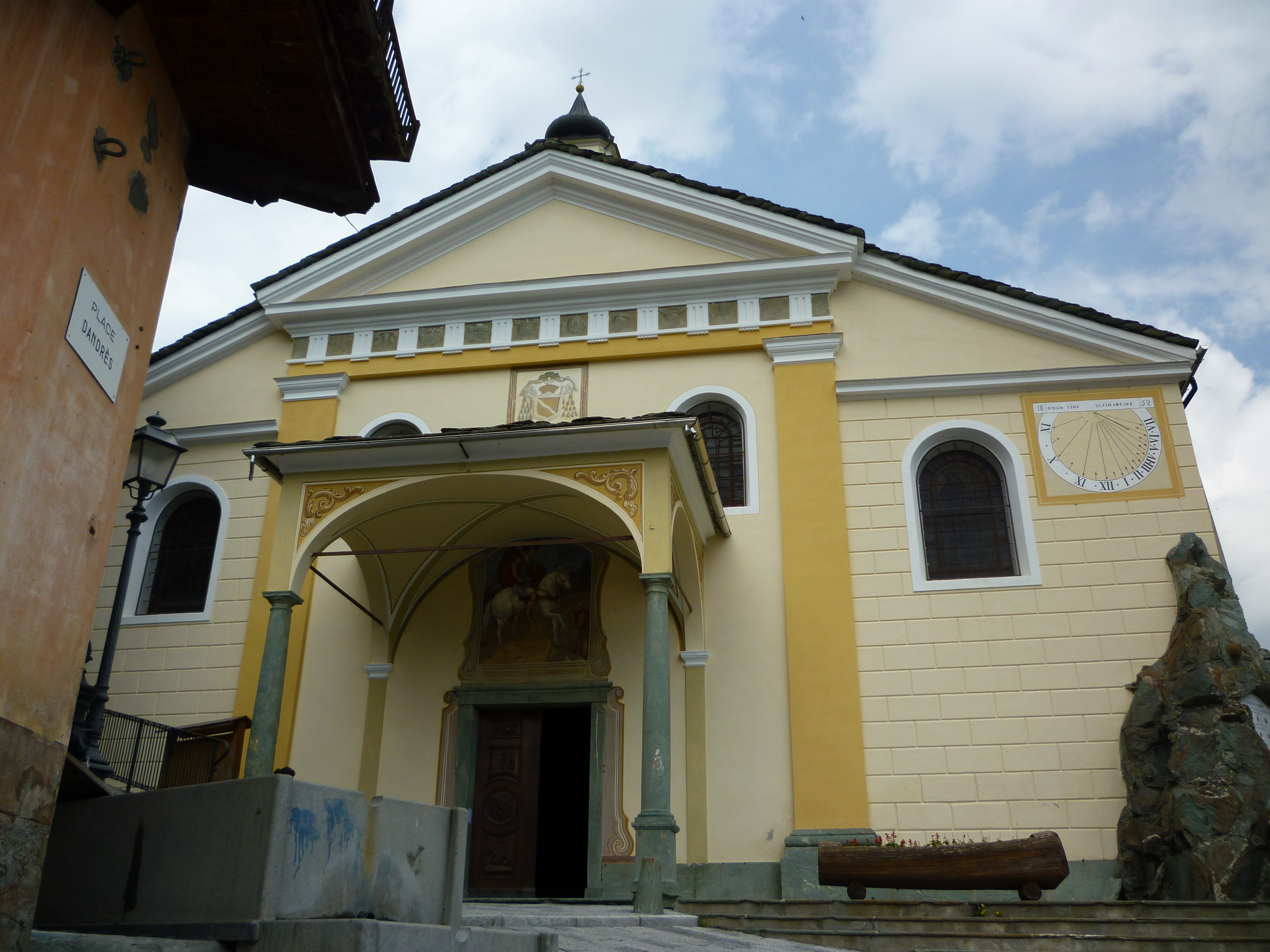
Church of Saint Martin of Tours, François-Marie Dandrès Square, Antagnod.

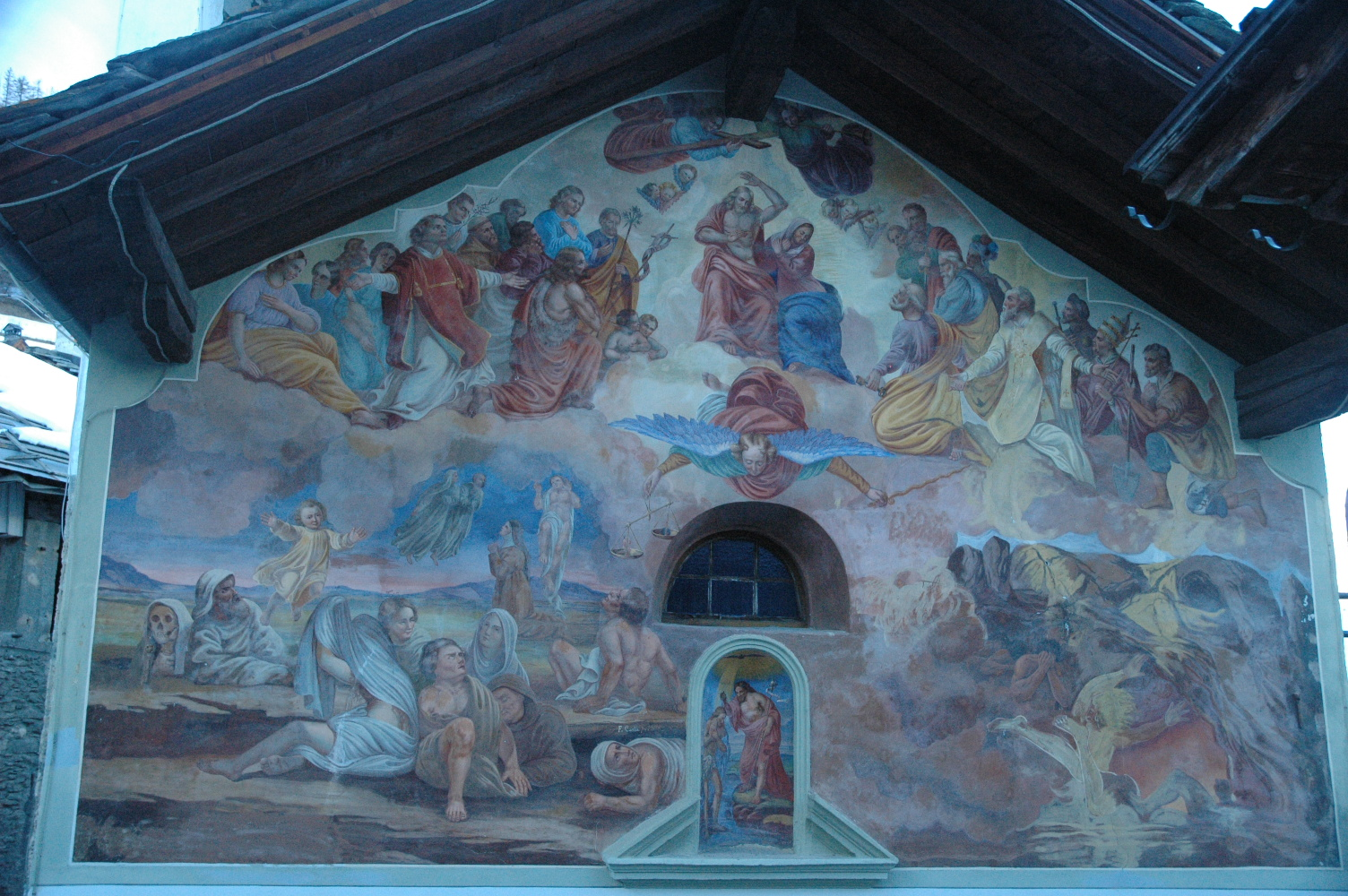
The Last Judgment on the Church of Our Lady of Sorrows, Lignod.

- The Church of Saint Martin of Tours in Antagnod is an interesting religious building with an onion dome on François-Marie Dandrès Square, named for the parish priest Dandrès from Fontainemore who expanded the church to its current form. Entirely painted on the inside, it contains sacred works of art, the most important being the high altar. It is all that remains of the old church and is the most imposing and richest of all the baroque altars in the Aosta Valley: it is entirely carved in wood, which is painted and gilt and is divided horizontally into three sections. The top and bottom sections were carved by Valsesiani Gilardi and Minaldi in 1713. This altar has recently undergone a restoration which ended in 2011.
- The Church of Saint Anne in Champoluc is today used as a cinema, but was once the main church of the village. The original chapel to Saint Anne was built in 1715 and the current building by the parish priest François-Marie Dandrès in 1836. Above the nineteenth century doorway, a circular fresco depicting Saint Anne showing the Scripture to Mary with Joachim behind her can be seen. The wooden altar and the frescoes of the old church are now held in a new church building next to the old one.
- The Church of Saint James in Saint-Jacques follows a very old design. At first a small chapel, it was expanded at the wish of Pope Alexander VI in 1500. Later the rich merchants of the village had it painted, but since it was below street level, a number of floods destroyed the frescoes. Today it has been raised up and it is possible to see the remains of the interior frescoes and the exterior walls. In the same square as this church is found a grotto similar to that of Lourdes with a statue of the Madonna inside.
- The Sanctuary of Barmasc as it is seen today dates to 1744. Originally it was dedicated to Mary Magdalene but the people of Ayas have always called it Notre-Dame de Barmasc. For this reason François-Marie Dandrès asked permission to rename it as a sanctuary and name it after Notre-Dame du Bon-Secours (French for "Our Lady of Good Help"). Inside it there are sacred artworks and the altar with the picture of a folk hero on top.
- The Church of Our Lady of Sorrows in Lignod was expanded in 1777 by Jean-Baptiste Prince. However the Last Judgement on the façade was painted by Franz Curta in the nineteenth century. This fresco is based, according to some people, on the Last Judgement of Michelangelo.

=== Secular architecture ===
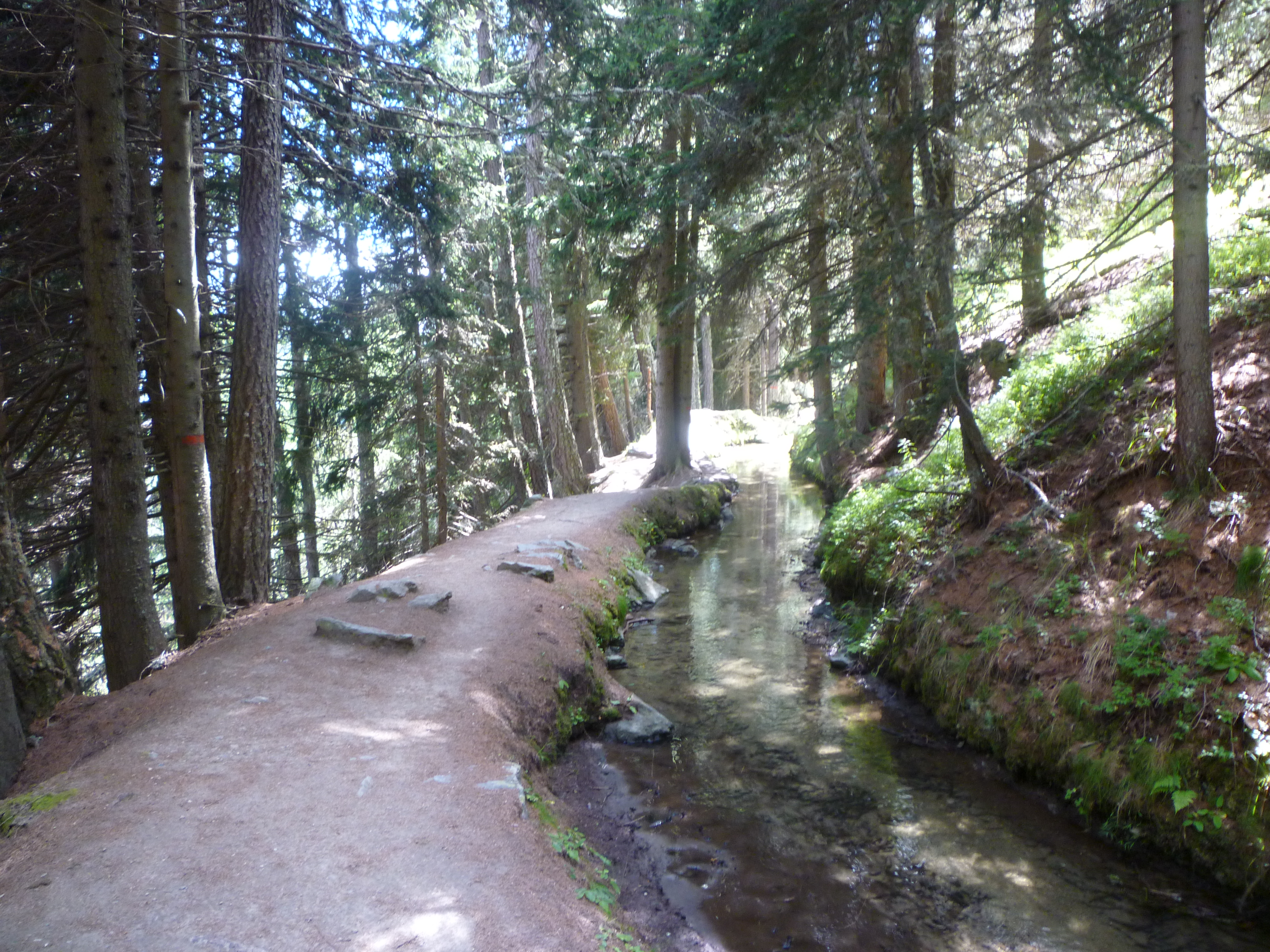
The Rû Courtaud in Ayas, above Barmasc.

As regards popular architecture, the popular building par excellence is the rascard (of Walser origin). The main materials are stone and brick, materials in which the territory is rich. These are combined in the simple, but elegant form of the common house of Ayas, which served as home, stable, and barn. It is characterised by the presence of two or more floors - the lower floor of stone and the upper of wood, separated by an architectural layer of stone mushrooms which serve to keep rats from climbing up to the inhabited floor. The roof with a frame composed of tree trunks is covered over by flagstone - flat stones typical of the Walser landscape. Within this framework there are many characteristic and variable artistic elements, such as the finish of the wood, the round-arched doors, the lattices on the windows. In addition, the people of Ayas painted their houses in the same way as their churches, so it is not unusual for passers-through to encounter representations of the Madonna, Jesus, the Saints and the Sacred Family.

- At Antagnod, the geometric construction of the Maison Merlet and the Maison Challant (or Maison Fournier) on the main street, where a castellan of the ruling Challant family lived in the fifteenth century, is of interest.
- The Villa Rivetti is found in Antagnod. It was designed by the Biellese industrialise Giuseppe Rivetti and built in 1924. Today it is the town hall of Ayas.
- The ancient village of Champoluc is full of traditional buildings and frescoes.
- The Rû Courtaud, an ancient Rû (canal) which carries water from Saint-Jacques to Saint-Vincent.

== Society & culture ==
=== Tradition and folklore ===
The woodwork of the sabotiers d'Ayas is renowned for its sabot shoes, known in the local dialect as tsôques (French: socques).

There are many popular tales which are recounted about the villages and some local places, like the chapel of Salus and the hermitage of Résy.

=== Language and dialects ===
Apart from official French and Italian, in addition to the patois valdôtain, the local population also understand Piedmontese as a result of the geographical proximity and historical links with Canavese.

=== Institutions, entities and associations ===
The Compagnie des guides de Champoluc-Ayas, a society of mountain guides is found in Champoluc.

=== Education ===
There are kindergartens and elementary schools in Ayas. The municipal library is based at Antagnod.

==== Museums ====
- The Museum of Religious Art, located in the Antagnod cemetery chapel, contains some objects which attest the richness of the Church in Ayas.
- The seat of the guides, a building in rascard style called the "Maison des Guides", is located in Champoluc.

=== Sport ===
Tsan, a traditional sport of the Aosta Valley, is played in this municipality.

== Economy ==
The economy of the comune is very different from what it was a century ago. Today it concentrates mostly on tourist activities: hotels, restaurants, bars, shops, chalets, and other tertiary sector activities. The skiing facilities of Monterosa Ski are essential to the economy. There are, however, still some artisanal and agricultural activities.

Based on the tax returns of 2006, published in 2007, Ayas is the richest comune in Italy: on average the citizens earn over €66,000 per year. This result is affected by the fact that the founder of Fastweb, Silvio Scaglia, lives in the comune.

=== Tourism ===
The main activity of Ayas is tourism. Thus in the course of the year the commune and residents offer many activities to holidaymakers to discover the beauty of the territory and culture of Ayas. There are two skiing facilities - one in Antagnod and one in Champoluc. Antagnod was included in the 2008 edition of The most beautiful villages in Italy. Ayas takes part in the Unité des communes valdôtaines de l'Évançon.

=== People connected to Ayas ===
- François-Marie Dandrès (Fontainemore, 4 July 1791 – Ayas, 7 December 1866) was of great importance to Ayas, although a minor individual in the History of the Aosta Valley. Appointed parish pried in 1817, he was particularly concerned with the education of children and adults, having many schools built and expanded for this purpose in Ayas. The schools of Antagnod and Champoluc (1819) were founded by him. In addition, Dandrès had several religious buildings built and restored, as well as expanding the church of Antagnod.

==== Natives of Ayas ====
- Évalde Obert (1912-1990) - nicknamed lo méhtre Tatcha (the Master Tatcha), poet in patois valdôtain.
- Simone Origone, speed skier
- Ivan Origone, speed skier
- Antonio Fosson - Italian senator (2008-2013)
- Louis de Jyaryot - singer/songwriter in patois valdôtain

==== Other individuals ====
- Edmondo de Amicis, writer
- Guido Gozzano, writer
- Giuseppe Saragat, politician and President of Italy

== Gallery ==
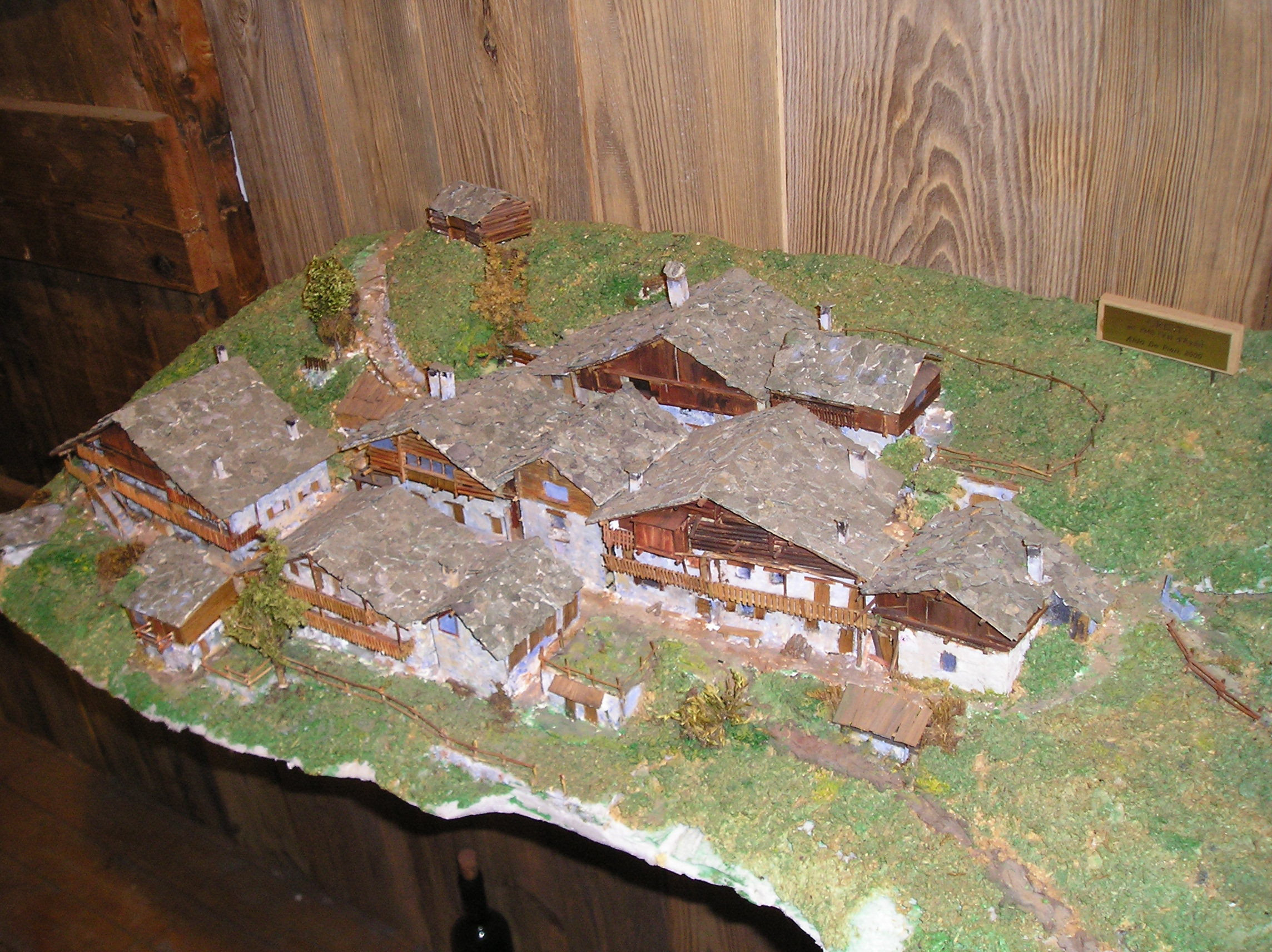
Plastic of Crest, a walser village above Champoluc on the orographic left of the Ayas valley

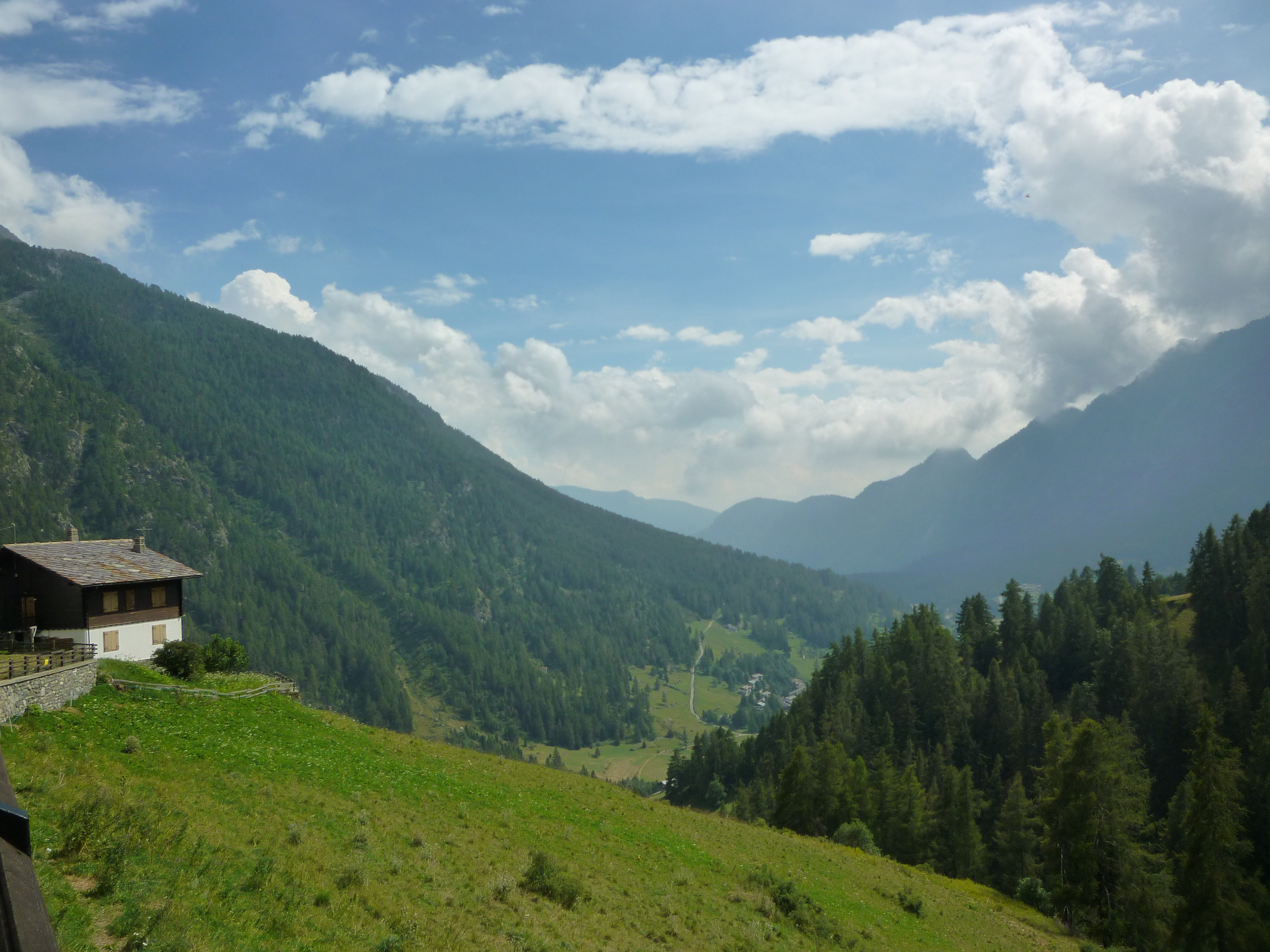
Panorama of the High Ayas valley seen from Bisous hamlet

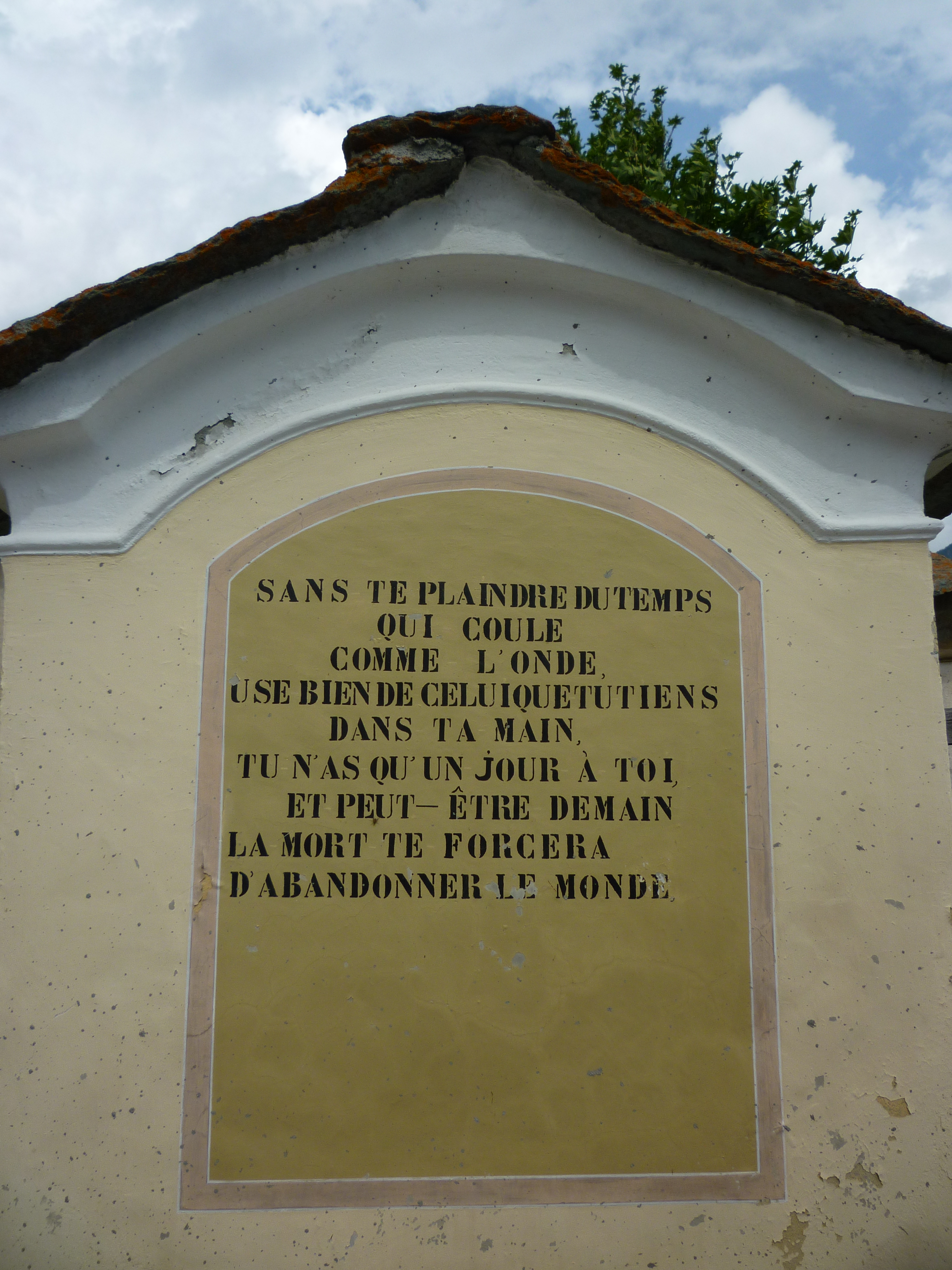
Entrance to the Antagnod Cemetery

== See also ==
- Lake Perrin

== Bibliography ==
- A.A V.V. Ayas: storia, usi, costumi e tradizioni della valle, con fotografie di Gianfranco Bini, Ayas: Società guide Champoluc, vol 1–2, 1968
- A.A. V.V. Guida Rurale della Valle d'Aosta. Comunità Montana Evançon, Assessorato Agricoltura e Risorse Naturali - Regione Autonoma Valle d'Aosta, 2009.
- Mario Aldrovandi (ed.), La Valle di Champoluc: Challant, Brusson, Ayas, Torino: Lattès, 1931
- Pierre-Joseph Alliod, Grammaire du patois d'Ayas, Aoste: Duc, 1998
- Abbé Louis Bonin, Vallée de Challand - Brusson - Guide et folk-lore, Mondovì, Mondovì Tipografia Commerciale, 1928.
- Luigi Capra, Giuseppe Saglio, Immagini di devozione popolare nel territorio di Ayas: pitture murali su abitazioni, cappelle e oratori, dal XVI al XX secolo in un comune della Valle d'Aosta, Ivrea: Priuli & Verlucca, 2005
- Garavoglia Claudio, Ayas ieri e oggi = Ayas iér é ouèi, 2007
- Saverio Favre, Luigi Capra, Giuseppe Scaglio, I sabotier d'Ayas. Mestiere tradizionale di una comunità valdostana, Priuli & Verlucca ed., Ivrea, 1995
- Saverio Favre, Les mystères du jugement et de l'antéchrist dans l'ancien carnaval d'Ayas, Société académique, religieuse et scientifique du Duché d'Aoste, 8, 2003, pp. 73–128
- G. Chiej-Gamacchio, La fabbricazione degli scroi o sabots: nota, Torino: Bona, 1916
- Amé Gorret & Giovanni Varale, Guida illustrata della Valle di Challant o d'Ayas, Biella: Tipografia commerciale, 1899
- Gabriella & Gian Piero Morchio, La memoria storica di Ayas: scritti e testimonianze nel "Canton de Magnea", 2nd edition, Genova, 1997.
- Gabriella & Gian Piero Morchio, Teutsch Aiatzer-Thal: la presenza walser ad Ayas, Genova, 1999.
- Alina Piazza, "Ayas, Pian Portola, roccia a coppelle", Bulletin d'études préhistoriques et archéologiques alpines, vol. 12, 2001, pp. 189–190.
- Cesare Poma, Il dialetto di Ayas, Torino: G. Candeletti, 1884
- Claudine Remacle, Danilo Marco, Giovanni Thumiger, Ayas: uomini e architettura, Saint-Christophe: Duc, 2005
- Claudine Remacle, Construire en montagne: l'exemple d'Ayas à travers les prix-faits du XVIIe et du XVIIIe siècle, Archivum Augustanum, 2, 2002, pp. 59–111.
- Marco Soggetto, "Le Vette della Val d'Ayas", L'Escursionista Editore, Rimini, 2008.
- Ugo Torra, La Valle di Challant-Ayas: le sue antichità, Ivrea: Bardessono, 1958.
- Ornella Vergnano Gambi, Roberto Gabbrielli, La composizione minerale della vegetazione degli affioramenti ofiolitici dell'alta Valle di Ayas, 1981
