= Val Vogna =

Valley in Riva Valdobbia, Italy

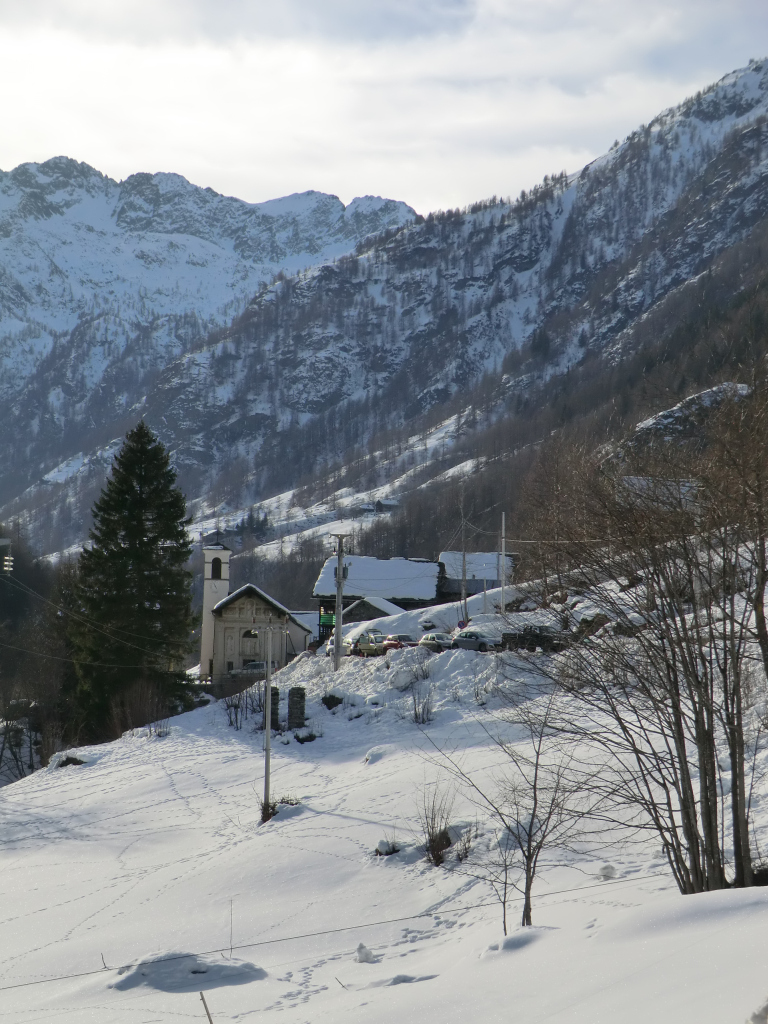
- Sant'Antonio, Val Vogna

- Location within Italy
- Floor elevation: 1100-3200
- Long-axis direction: east-west

Geography
- Population centers: Riva Valdobbia
- Borders on: Valle d'Otro, Valle Artogna, Valle del Lys
- Coordinates: 45°48′52.56″N 7°55′49.4″E
- Rivers: Vogna, Rissuolo
- Interactive map of Val Vogna

Val Vogna (I' Vejin in Walser) is a lateral valley of Valsesia, inside the municipality of Riva Valdobbia, Italy.

West of Riva Valdobbia town, opens the Val Vogna, a side valley just in part served by paved road, on the old so-called Antica via d'Aosta “ancient Aosta Track”, that united Riva Valdobbia to Gressoney-Saint-Jean through the colle di Valdobbia, the Valdobbia Pass.

== Geography ==
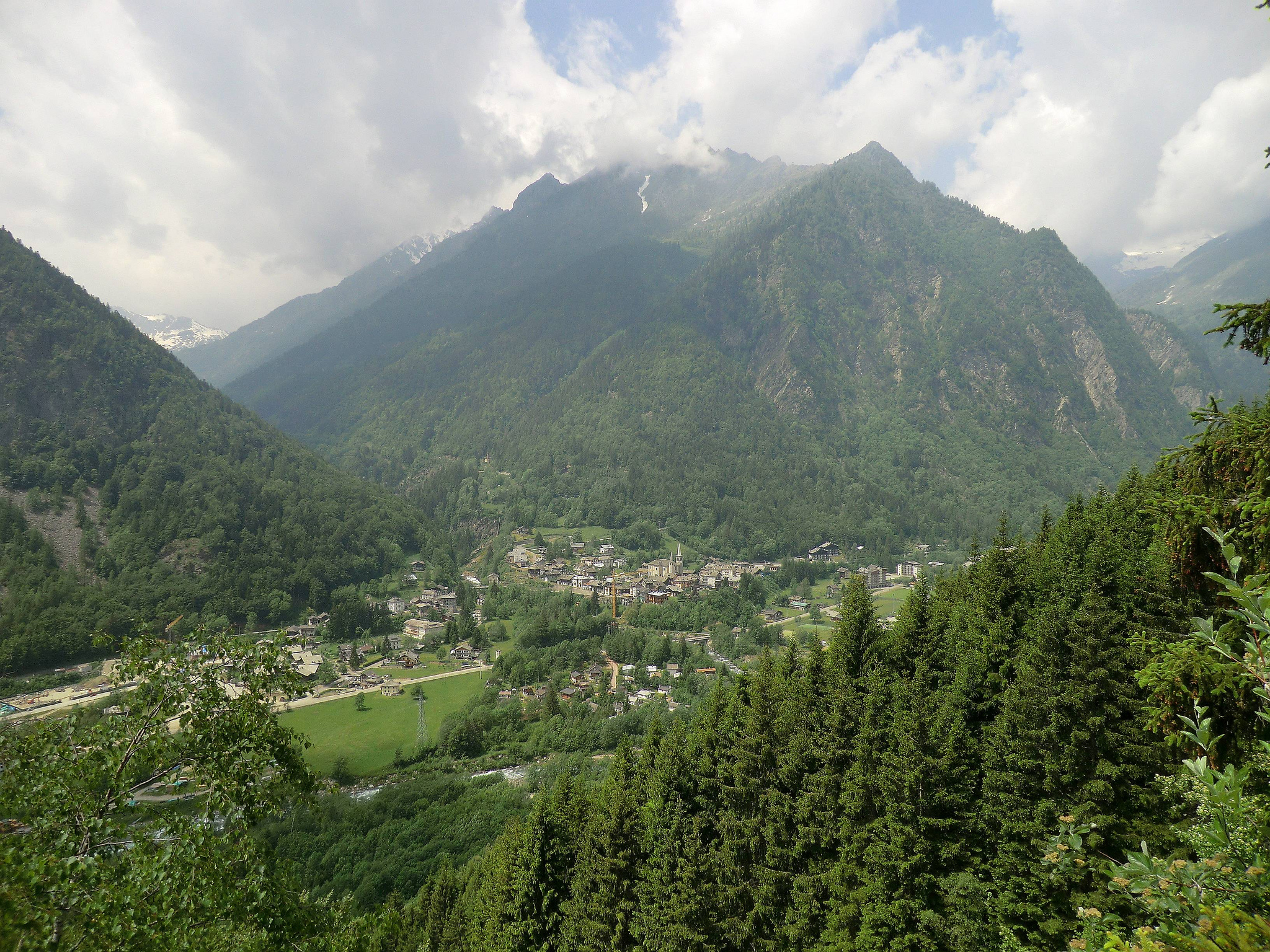
Riva Valdobbia and the plains at confluence of the Sesia river and the Vogna torrent.

Val Vogna opens west of Riva Valdobbia as a tributary of the Sesia Valley, with Val d'Otro north and Valle Artogna south. The general direction of the valley is East to West, with a slight moonshaped round turn pointing southwest at the end. There is only one notable tributary to the Vogna torrent, the Rissuolo torrent from Corno Bianco peak. The Rissuolo torrent makes a sharp cut in the middle of the north slope and reaches the main valley just west of La Peccia Hamlet, passing under the so-called Napoleonic Bridge.

Val Vogna was an emigration route, connecting Valsesia and Val d'Aosta through the colle Valdobbia pass (2480 m.).

The Antica via d'Aosta, later renamed via Regia (Royal path), follows the Vogna Valley up to the Napoleonic Bridge: here, the track leaves the main valley and climbs on the west bulkhead of the Rissuolo torrent valley, up to La Montata Hamlet (m. 1739) and then inside up to Colle Valdobbia and its Ospizio Sottile mountain hut.

On the pass, the rifugio Ospizio Sottile was built in the 19th century to give shelter to people moving in and out the valley.

The “Aosta Track” was a major emigration route for most of the Sesia Valley people going for seasonal works abroad, mostly in France. The Sesia Valley goes basically eastward from the Monte Rosa to Varallo and the plains, so it was much shorter to pass the mountains in this relative safe spot.

As the migrations period were early in spring and late in the autumn, accidents due to bad weather and avalanches were frequent. A small provisional hut was built, then the more substantial Ospizio in stone was built and dedicated to Nicolao Sottile, a priest that worked hard to find the money and volunteers for the building. Today, the Ospizio Sottile is a common destination for hikers and mountaineers.

== Roads ==
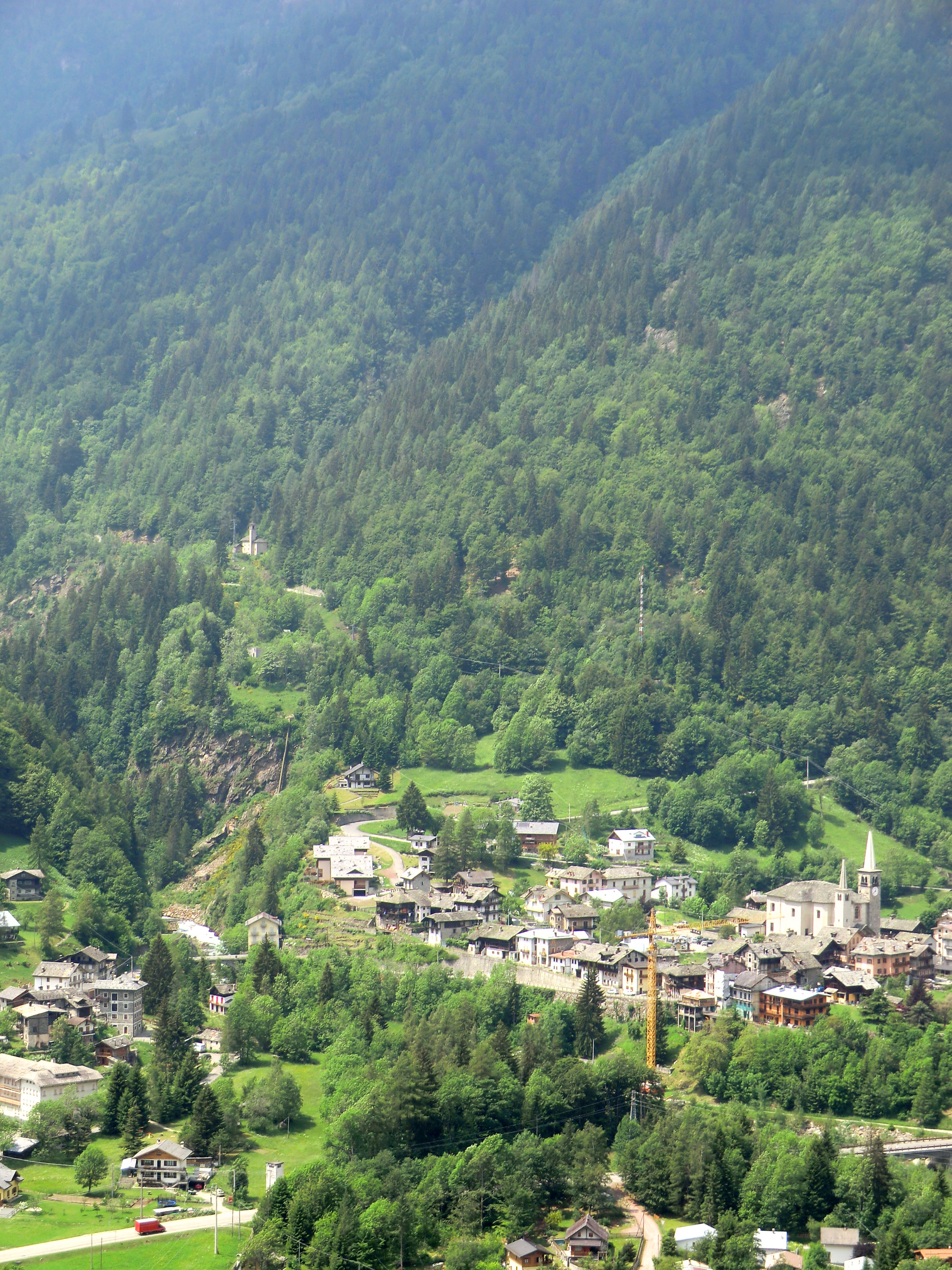
Riva Valdobbia and the road going uphill into Vogna Valley

The valley has a paved road that starts near Riva Valdobbia's cemetery and goes up with few hairpin turns to the frazione (hamlet) Cà di Janzo and then gently uphill to Sant'Antonio Hamlet, obliterating the old tracks.

A dirt road begins from Sant'Antonio school house (now a restaurant and mountain hut in the GTA route) and goes up to just under La Peccia hamlet, but its use by offroad vehicles is restricted to farmers and local inhabitants.

=== Paths and hikes ===
Val Vogna offers many hikes.

The emigration route connecting Valsesia and Val d'Aosta is the Antica via d'Aosta, later renamed via Regia (Royal path): This track is identified as No.201 by Club Alpino Italiano, with a black 1 on a red/yellow/red triparted marking on stones and trees.

The track 1a variant leaves the main one after La Montata and heads west on the woods on a short track to the Alpe Larecchio a former mountain lake basin, now a pasture land of marshes and grassfields, where a small nucleus of few houses is still in use to make Toma cheese.

Track 1c gets a different route, from Alpe Larecchio to the west, up to Lago della Balma lake and then east on the peaks to reach the Colle Valdobbia.

Horace Bénédict de Saussure followed the entire valley on his Great Tour of the Alpes: the GTA (or no.205 path) continued gently uphill from the Napoleonic Bridge following Vogna Torrent up to Alpe Maccagno another ancient pasture land at 2188m with few stone houses: this was the place of the original Toma del Maccagno cheese, while nowadays the name is in use by many producers, mostly on the Biella area that lay behind Passo del Maccagno Pass.

The CAI No.202 path (bold 2 on red/yellow/red) leaves the dirt road midway between Sant'Antonio and La Peccia Hamlet to head up the east bank of the Rissuolo valley to Alpe Pile where the Rifugio Abate Carestia mountain hut is located and then up to Lago Bianco and Lago Nero (White and Black Lake) or the Corno Bianco, 3320 m., the highest peak in the Vogna valley in ma maze of sub-tracks.

No.211 track gets to Corno Bianco in a more direct way, while No.210 starts from the lower hamlet of Ca di' Janzo, on the paved road, and climbs directly to Selveglio Hamlet and then the Cima Mutta peak 2135, the north bulkhead of the Vogna Valley overlooking Riva Valdobbia.

=== The frazioni Alte or Via della Fede ring ===
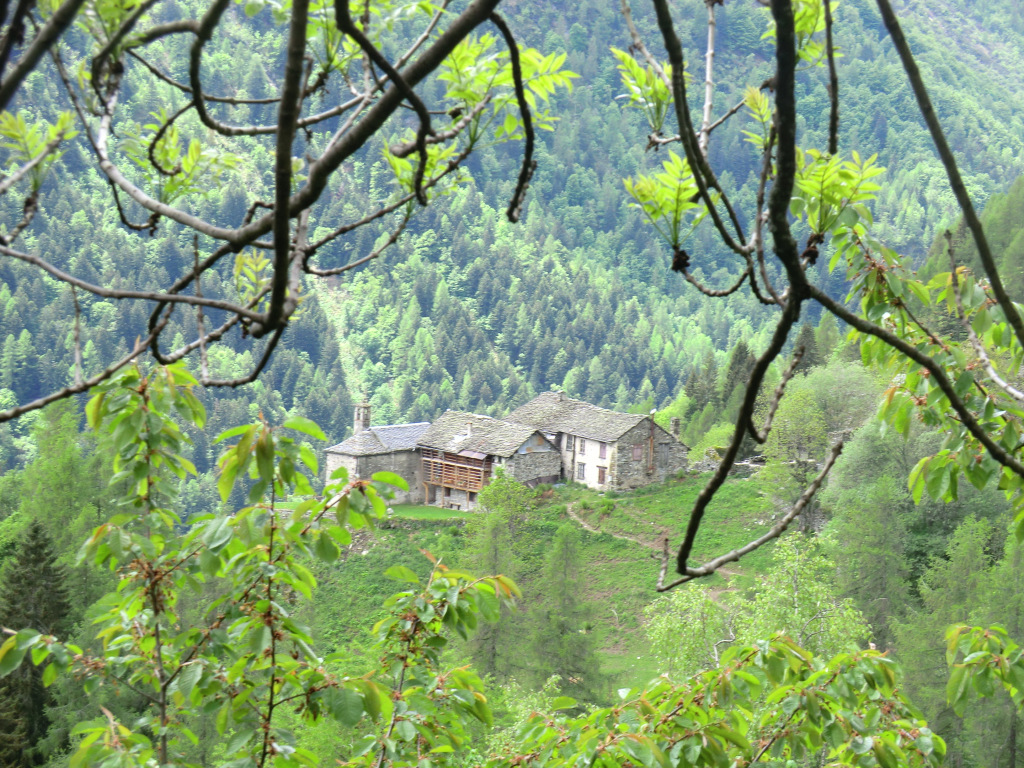
Oro hamlet in Vogna Valley seen from Selveglio hamlet along the "frazioni alte" trial

The above-mentioned tracks are mostly for experienced or dedicated hikers. A less strenuous but more interesting walk is the so-called giro delle Frazioni Alte, the Higher Hamlets ring. This ring is also marked as Via della Fede (Faith path) or "via dell'Arte" by separate organizations, making some confusion in signs and names.

Basically, the tour touches all the hamlets of the lower Vogna valley, in an in-depth exploration of how Walsers lived up to the 19th century.

Each hamlet is a self-sufficient nucleus, with a fountain, a community oven and a small chapel, but they are few hundred meters away from one another creating a larger sparse community.

The ring has a roughly triangular fixed route, with the lower road (the above-mentioned No.1 track) from Ca' di Janzo and the higher path from Selveglio converging on La Peccia. The steep slope between the two paths doesn't allow to easily connect the lower and the higher hamlets, except for the Sant'Antonio-Rabernardo shortcut.

== Gallery ==
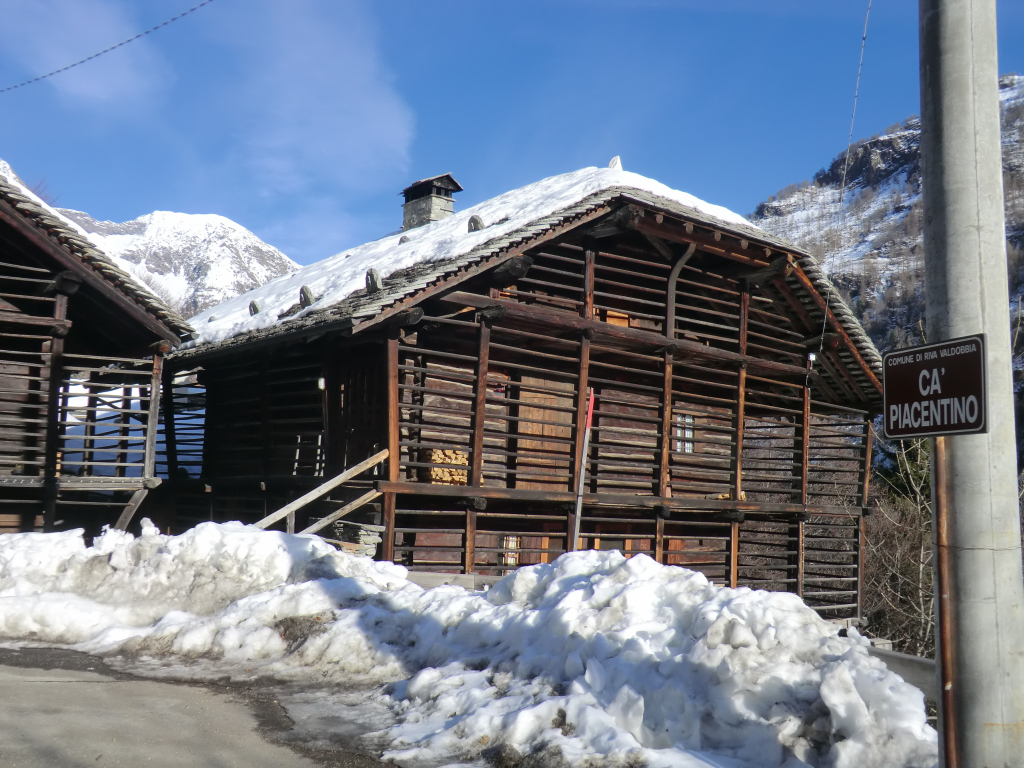
Ca' Piacentino Hamlet, Val Vogna

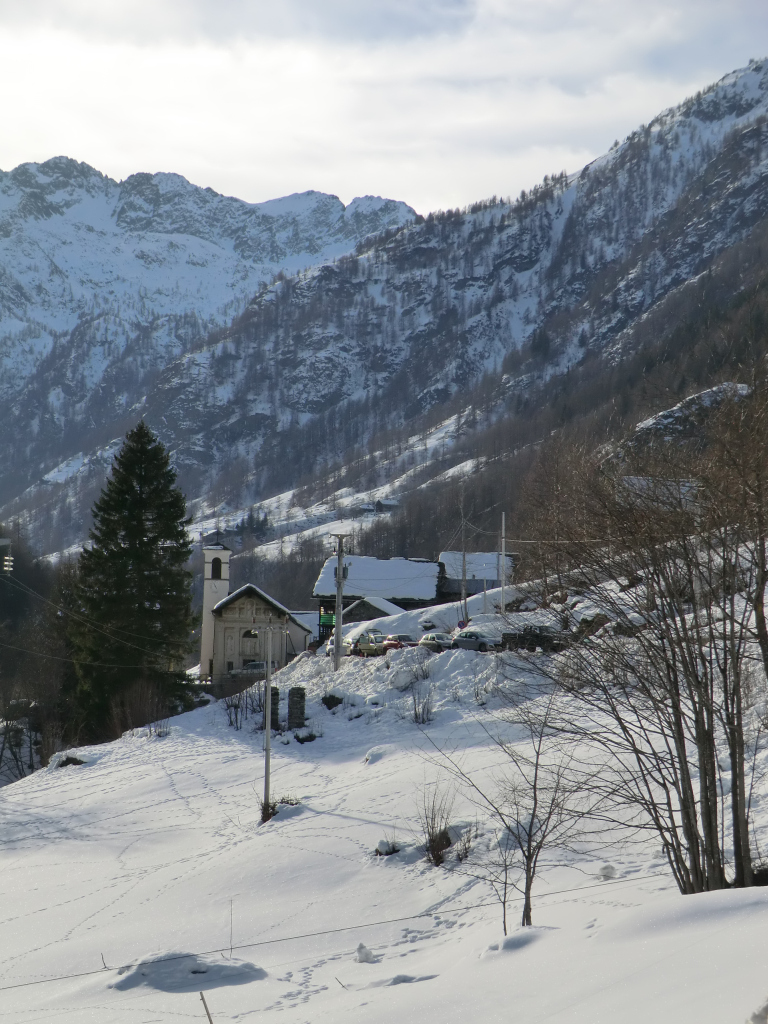
Sant'Antonio Hamlet, Val Vogna
