= Corno d'Olen =

Mountain in Italy

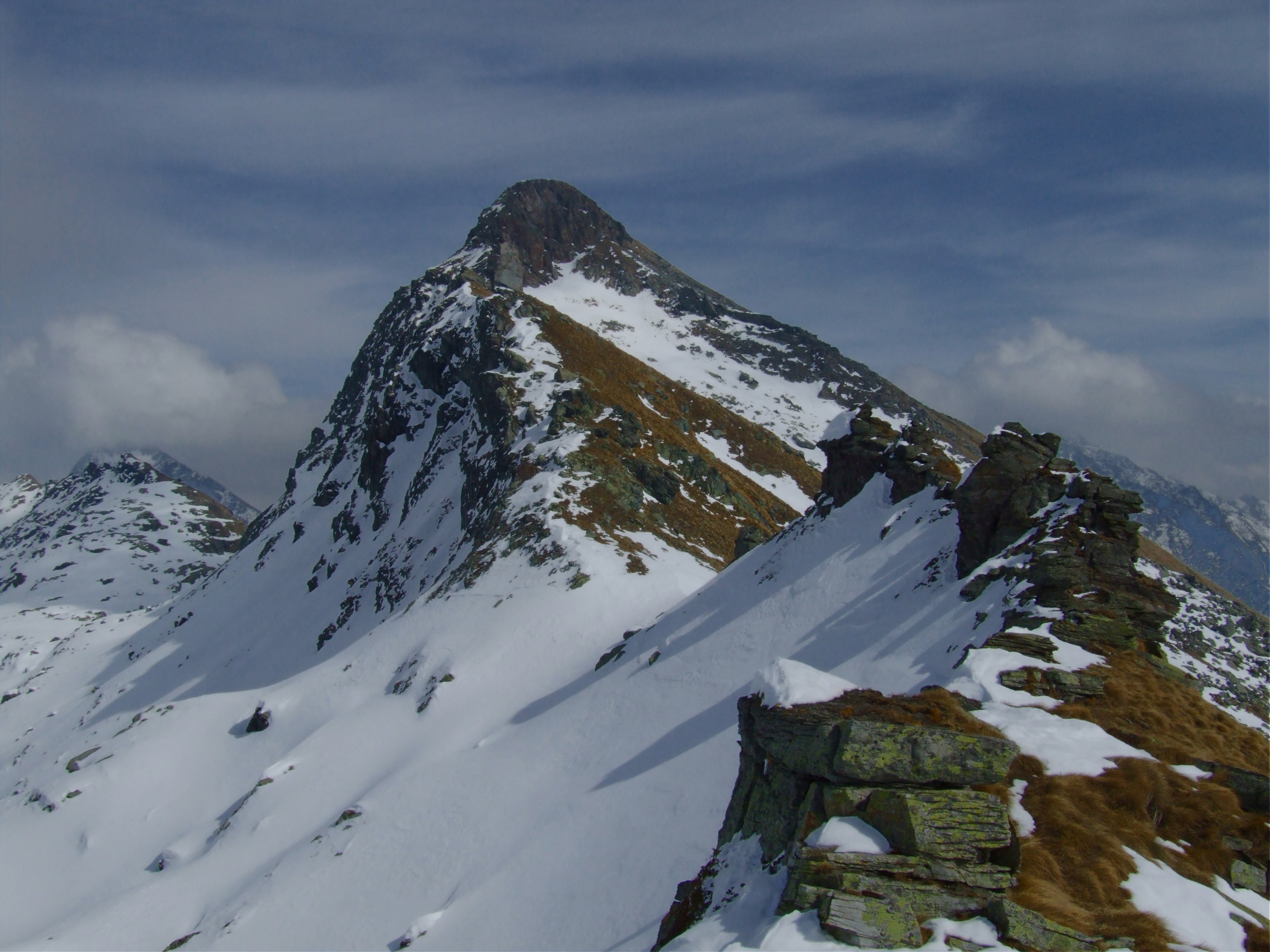

Highest point
- Elevation: 2,556 m (8,386 ft)
- Prominence: 162 m (531 ft)
- Coordinates: 45°52′29″N 7°54′38″E

Geography
- Location: Piedmont, Italy
- Parent range: Pennine Alps

Corno d'Olen (Olenhoure in Walser) is a mountain of Piedmont, Italy, with an elevation of 2,556 metres (8,386 ft). It is located in the Pennine Alps, in the Province of Vercelli.

Part of the Monte Rosa group, the Corno d'Olen overlooks the village of Alagna Valsesia. A small alpine lake is located about two hundred meters below its peak.
