= Rifugio Guglielmina =

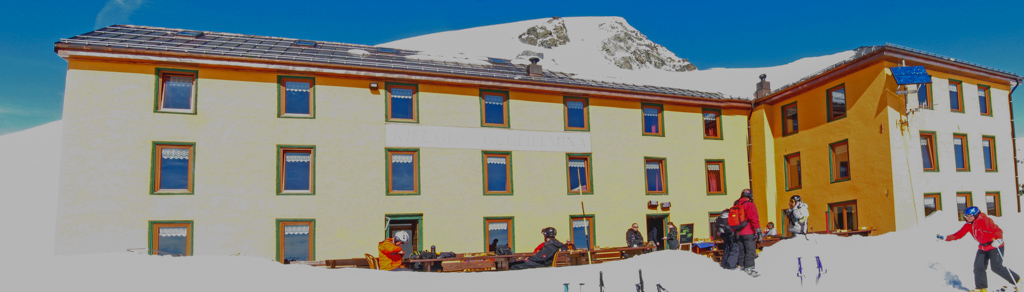
- Rifugio Guglielmina, March 2009
- Interactive map of the Rifugio Guglielmina area

General information
- Location: Passo dei Salati
- Coordinates: 45°52′14.3″N 7°52′20.7″E
- Elevation: 2,880 m (9,450 ft)
- Year built: 1878
- Owner: Alberto Calaba

Rifugio Guglielmina was an historic alpine hut on the South side of the Monte Rosa range at 2880 m above sea level, situated in the commune of Alagna Valsesia, Piedmont, Italy. Built in 1878 (or the 1860s according to one source), it was destroyed by fire on 22 December 2011.

It had been described as "Europe’s highest hotel", and until its destruction it was run by the great-grandson of the original builder.

In January 2013 the owners, the families Guglielmina and Calaba, announced that they could not afford to reconstruct the building.

== Bibliography ==
- Baedeker, Karl (1928). Switzerland (27 ed.). Leipzig: Karl Baedeker. p. 433.. 27th edition ( Hinrichsen No. E093) of classic guidebooks. Probably referred to passim in all post 1880 editions of this guide.
