= Corno Bianco =

Mountain in Italy

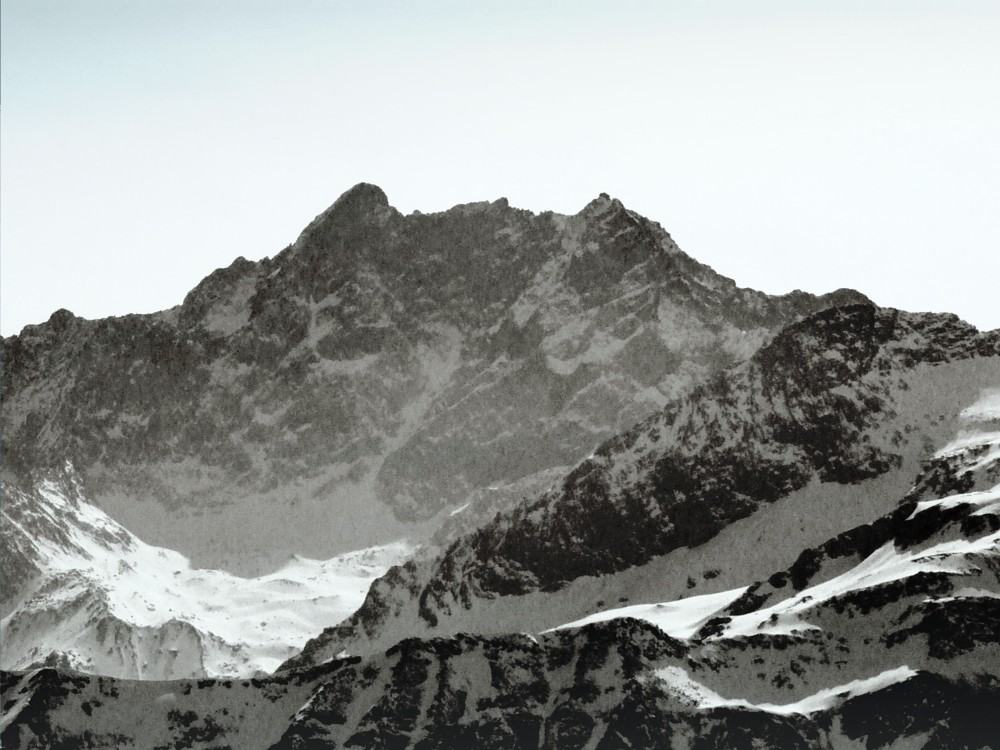
- View from Bocchetta delle Pisse

Highest point
- Elevation: 3,320 m (10,890 ft)
- Prominence: 470 m (1,540 ft)
- Isolation: 7.75 km (4.82 mi)
- Listing: Alpine mountains above 3000 m
- Coordinates: 45°49′22″N 07°52′47″E

Geography
- Location within Alps
- Location: Piedmont, Italy
- Parent range: Pennine Alps

Climbing
- First ascent: captain Albert (1831)
- Easiest route: from Riva Valdobbia

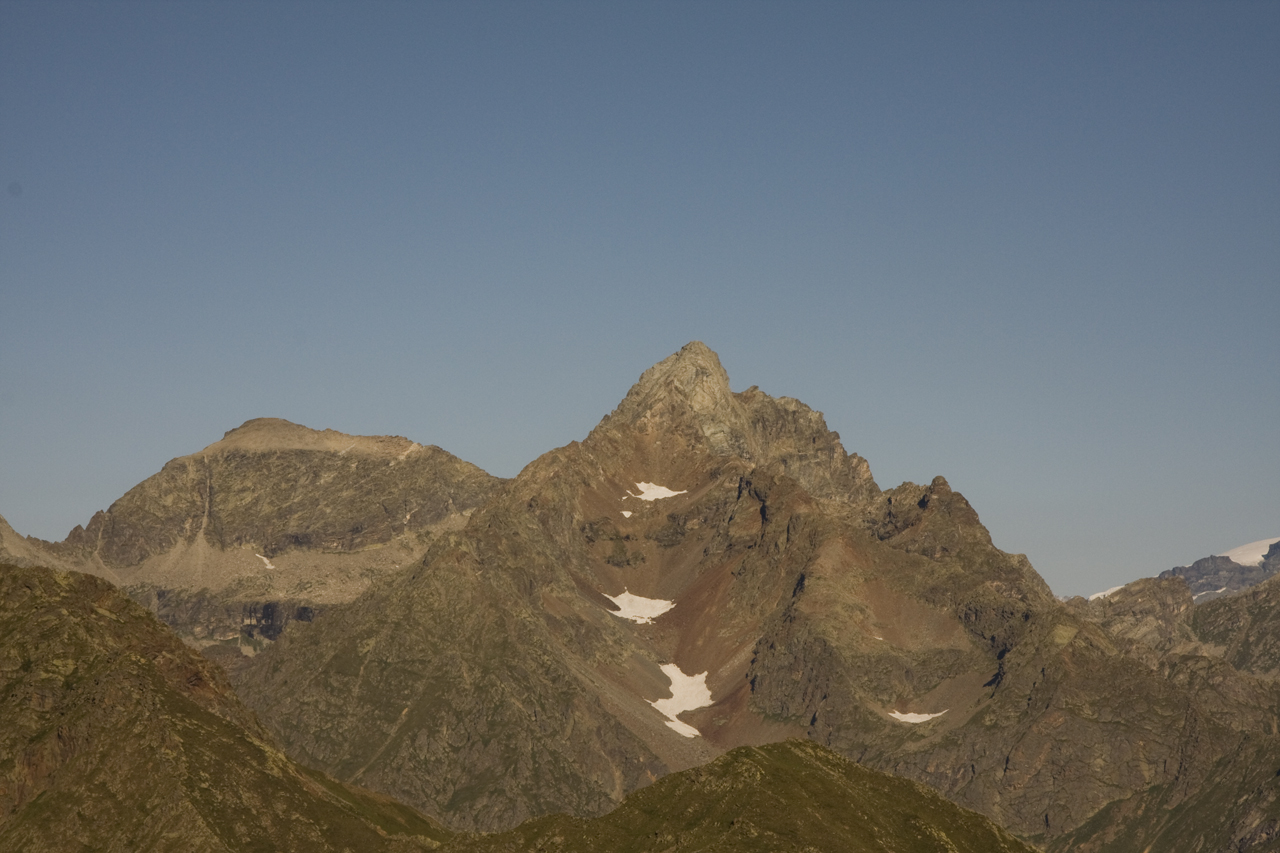
The summit seen from Punta Sivella

Corno Bianco (Weisshorn in German) is a mountain of the Pennine Alps. It's a popular climbing destination of Valsesia.

== Etymology ==
The literal English translation of Corno Bianco is White Horn.

== Geography ==
The mountain is located around 500 m east from the Dora Baltea/Sesia water divide and is totally included in Valsesia (VC, Italy). Administratively it belongs to the comunes of Alagna Valsesia and Riva Valdobbia.

=== SOIUSA classification ===
According to the SOIUSA (International Standardized Mountain Subdivision of the Alps) the mountain can be classified in the following way:

- main part = Western Alps
- major sector = North Western Alps
- section = Pennine Alps
- subsection = Southern Valsesia Alps
- supergroup = Contrafforti valsesiani del Monte Rosa
- group = Costiera del Corno Bianco
- subgroup =
- code = I/B-9.III-C.6

== Access to the summit ==
The easiest route for the summit starts from rifugio Abate Carestia (a CAI mountain hut) and follows the southern face and ridge of the mountain passing by Lago Bianco and Lago Nero. It requires some climbing skills.

== Maps ==
- Italian official cartography (Istituto Geografico Militare - IGM); on-line version: www.pcn.minambiente.it
- Istituto Geografico Centrale - Carta dei sentieri e dei rifugi scala 1:50.000 n. 10 Monte Rosa, Alagna e Macugnaga
