= Mollia =

- Comune
- Comune di Mollia
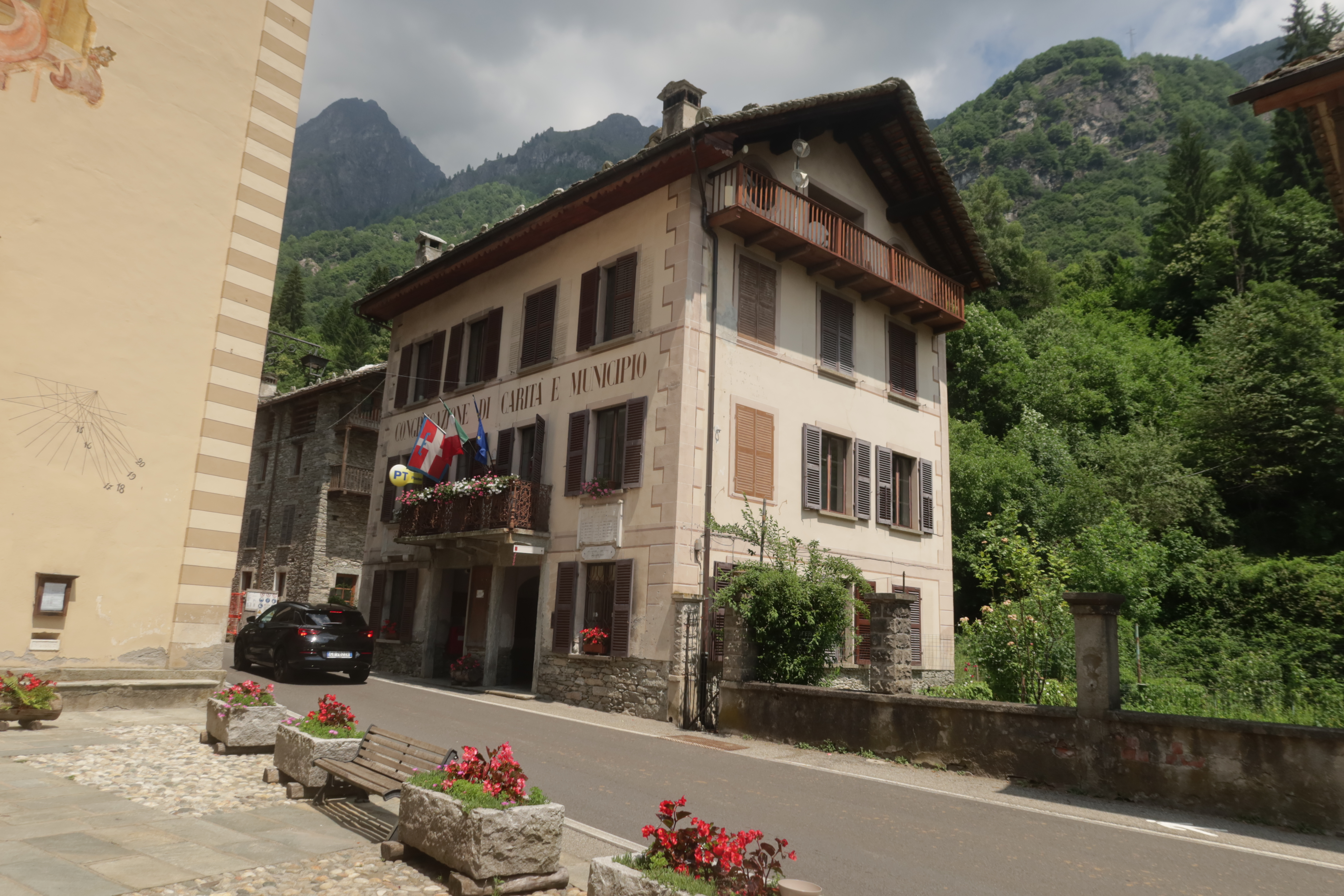

- Location within Italy Location within Piedmont
- Coordinates: 45°49′N 8°2′E
- Country: Italy
- Region: Piedmont
- Province: Vercelli (VC)
- Frazioni: Casa Capietto, Casacce, Curgo, Goreto, Grampa, Otra Sesia, Piana Fontana, Piana Toni, Piana Viana

Government
  - Mayor: Marilena Carmellino

Area
  - Total: 13.92 km^{2} (5.37 sq mi)
- Elevation: 880 m (2,890 ft)

Population (28 February 2017)
  - Total: 93
  - Density: 6.7/km^{2} (17/sq mi)
- Demonym: Molliesi
- Time zone: UTC+1 (CET)
  - Summer (DST): UTC+2 (CEST)
- Postal code: 13023
- Dialing code: 0163
- Website: Official website

Mollia is a comune (municipality) in the Province of Vercelli in the Italian region Piedmont, located about 90 kilometres (56 mi) northeast of Turin and about 60 kilometres (37 mi) northwest of Vercelli.

Mollia borders the following municipalities: Alto Sermenza, Boccioleto, Campertogno and Riva Valdobbia.
