= Monterosa Ski =

Ski area in the Alps

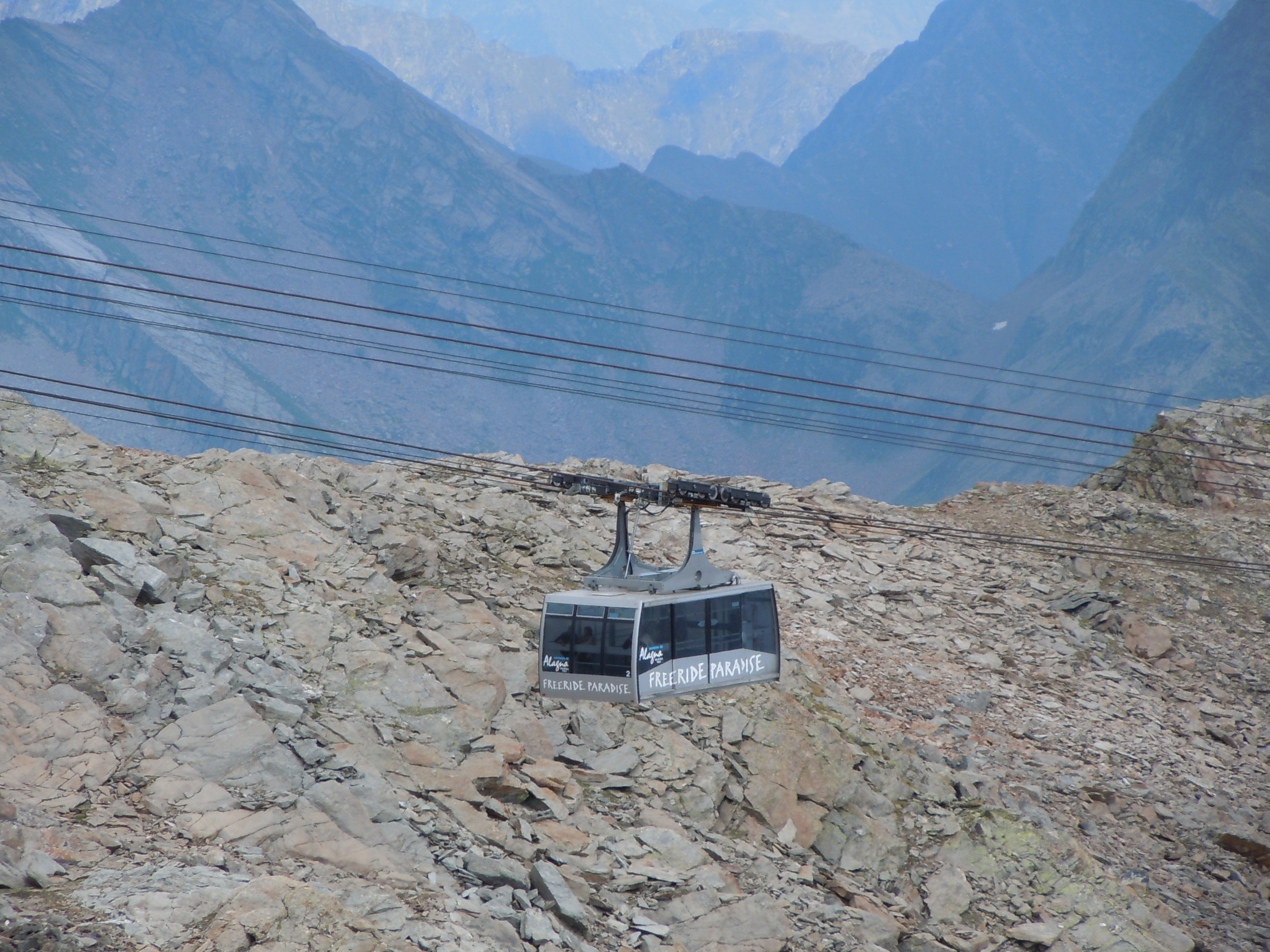
- Interactive map of Monterosa Ski
- Location: Aosta Valley, Piedmont, Italy
- Nearest city: Aosta
- Top elevation: 3,275 m (10,745 ft)
- Base elevation: 1,212 m (3,976 ft)
- Skiable area: 180 km of runs
- Trails: 66 (easy 19, intermediate 41, difficult 6)
- Longest run: 5.05 km (3.14 mi)
- Lift system: 37 lifts
- Terrain parks: 2
- Snowmaking: yes
- Website: www.monterosa-ski.it

The Monterosa Ski is an Italian ski resort, at the foot of Monte Rosa the second tallest mountain in the Alps, which links three valleys, located largely in the Aosta Valley and the remainder in Piedmont. Much of the area consists of easy and intermediate skiing, but the area around the Passo dei Salati and especially the steep slopes in Alagna Valsesia are a major and very famous destination for freeride skiers and snow-boarders.

== Description ==
The area takes its name from the huge and spectacular Monte Rosa massif as the heads of its three constituent valleys are located within this group. These valleys are the Val d'Ayas and the Lys Valley, located within the Aosta Valley, and Alagna Valsesia in the Valsesia Valley, in Piedmont.

The connections between the valleys are at the Bettaforca Pass (Ayas and Lys), and the Passo dei Salati (Lys and Valsesia). These connections are susceptible to closure in the case of high winds.

Since 2010, most of the lift system is open in summer for mountain bikers and hikers. One can reach Frachey (Ayas), then Alagna Valsesia and back within the same day using only the lifts.

== Ski Pistes and Lifts ==
There are approximately 180 km of ski slopes (almost all equipped with snow-making), from the most simple to the more technical (19 blue runs, 41 red runs and 6 black runs, including, in Gressoney-Saint-Jean, the most difficult of the whole Aosta Valley), and 38 lifts that start at a minimum altitude of 1212 m above sea level Alagna Valsesia and reach up to 3275 m s.l.m. at Indren Peak. The overall uplift capacity of the lift system is about 50,000 people per hour. The Alagna Valsesia part of the district is world-famous for its many off-piste skiing and ski mountaineering like Balma and Malfatta.

The ski area is operated jointly by two companies: Monterosa S.p.A. and MONTEROSA 2000 S.p.A. (of Alagna). They operatate a diverse range of ski lifts: funicular, funifor (Funifor Pianalunga - Passo dei Salati), cable car, ski lift, treadmill and chairlift (two-seater, three-seater, fixed-grip quad chairlift or automatic) are the different types of plants lifts that make up the district.

== Constituent Resorts ==
The individual villages and hamlets that are resorts within the ski area are :

- Ayas - Antagnod
- Ayas - Champoluc
- Brusson
- Gressoney-La-Trinité
- Gressoney-Saint-Jean
- Alagna Valsesia

Of these only Champoluc, Gressoney-La-Trinité and Alagna are directly connected by ski lifts and routes. This interconnected area forms the largest part of the available skiing. The Alpe di Mera was part of the Monterosa Ski for the seasons 2007-2008 and 2008-2009.
