= Passo dei Salati =

Mountain pass in Italy

Coordinates: 45.8761°N 7.868°E

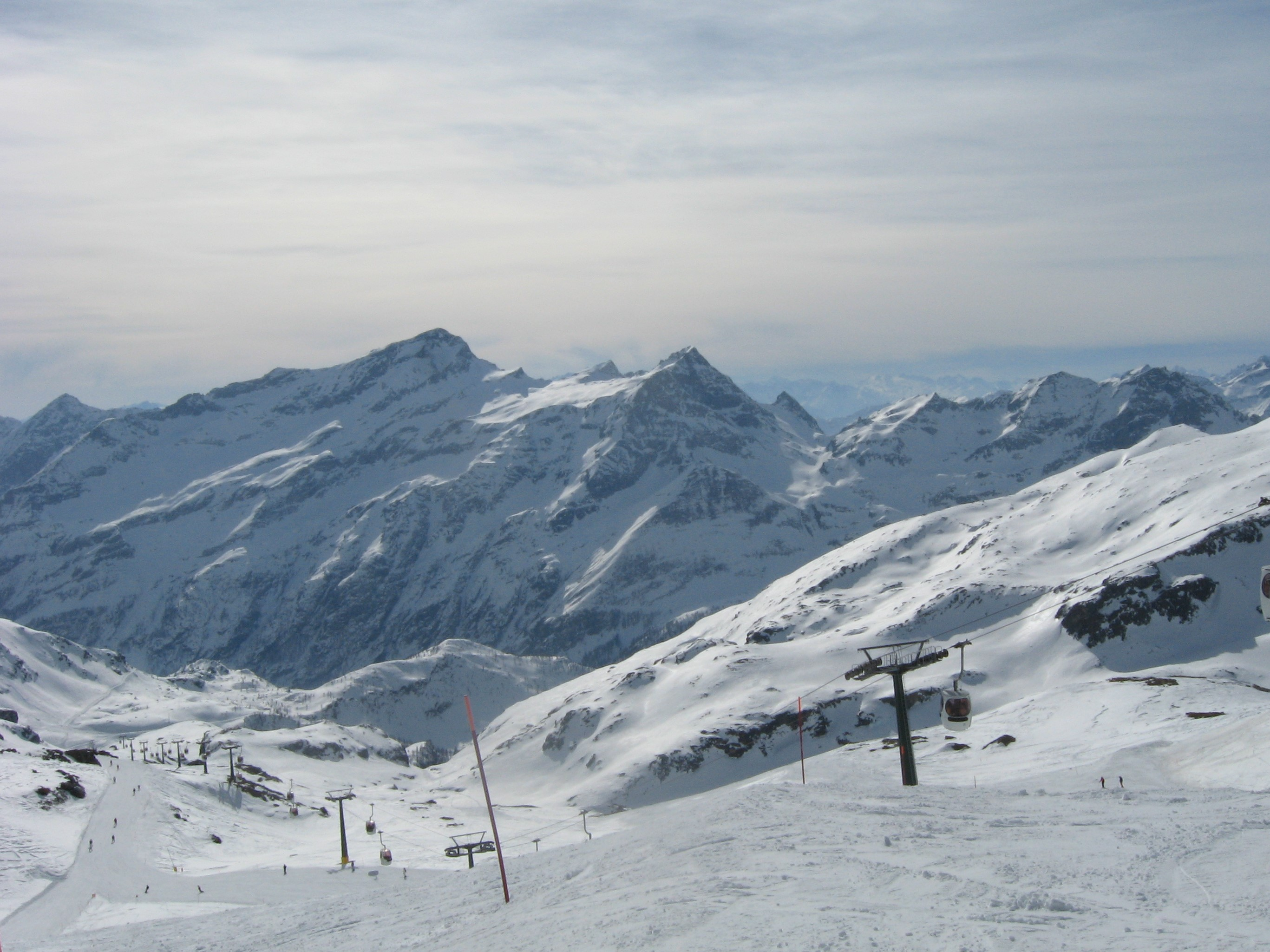
View west into Valle del Lys

The Passo dei Salati (2,980 m) is a mountain pass that lies between the Valsesia (Piedmont) and the Valley of Lys (Val de Aosta). It connects the villages of Alagna Valsesia and Gressoney-La-Trinité. The pass has also been known as the Colle Inferiore de Pisse. The term salati recalls an ancient passage of Roman soldiers.

== Description ==
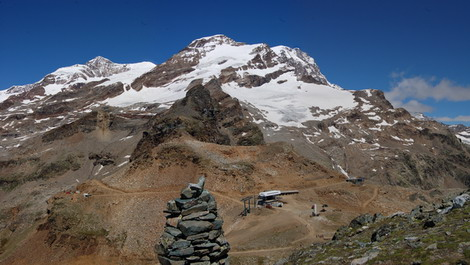
View of the pass from Col del Olen

It is reached by two modern cableways, a gondola from Gabiet above Gressoney-La-Trinité and a cable car from above Alagna, and is an important link for the Monterosa Ski area, which is one of the largest in Italy. A new cable car of the Funifor type was opened in 2010. This rises from just above the pass to the Indren Glacier extending the size of the ski area and providing a high altitude departure point for ski mountaineers.

From there it spread a lot of ski slopes : the one on the side of Olen Valsesiano ( Passo Salati - Pianalunga ), and that of the Salati slope in Val d'Aosta ( Passo Salati - Gabiet ) .

In the summer time the pass is accessible by a dirt track that connects the two sides. Although situated at nearly 3000 m above sea level, during the summer there is no perpetual snow.

In the immediate vicinity of the pass are a number of buildings. These include an physiological research station, the L'Istituto "Angelo Mosso" and two mountain huts (Rifugio Guglielmina and Rifugio Città di Vigevano ). The first two of these have both been seriously damaged by fires.

Extensive heliski operations occur near the two mountain huts during the later part of the winter.
