= Riva Valdobbia =

Riva Valdobbia Riifu, La Riva
- Frazione
- Comune di Riva Valdobbia
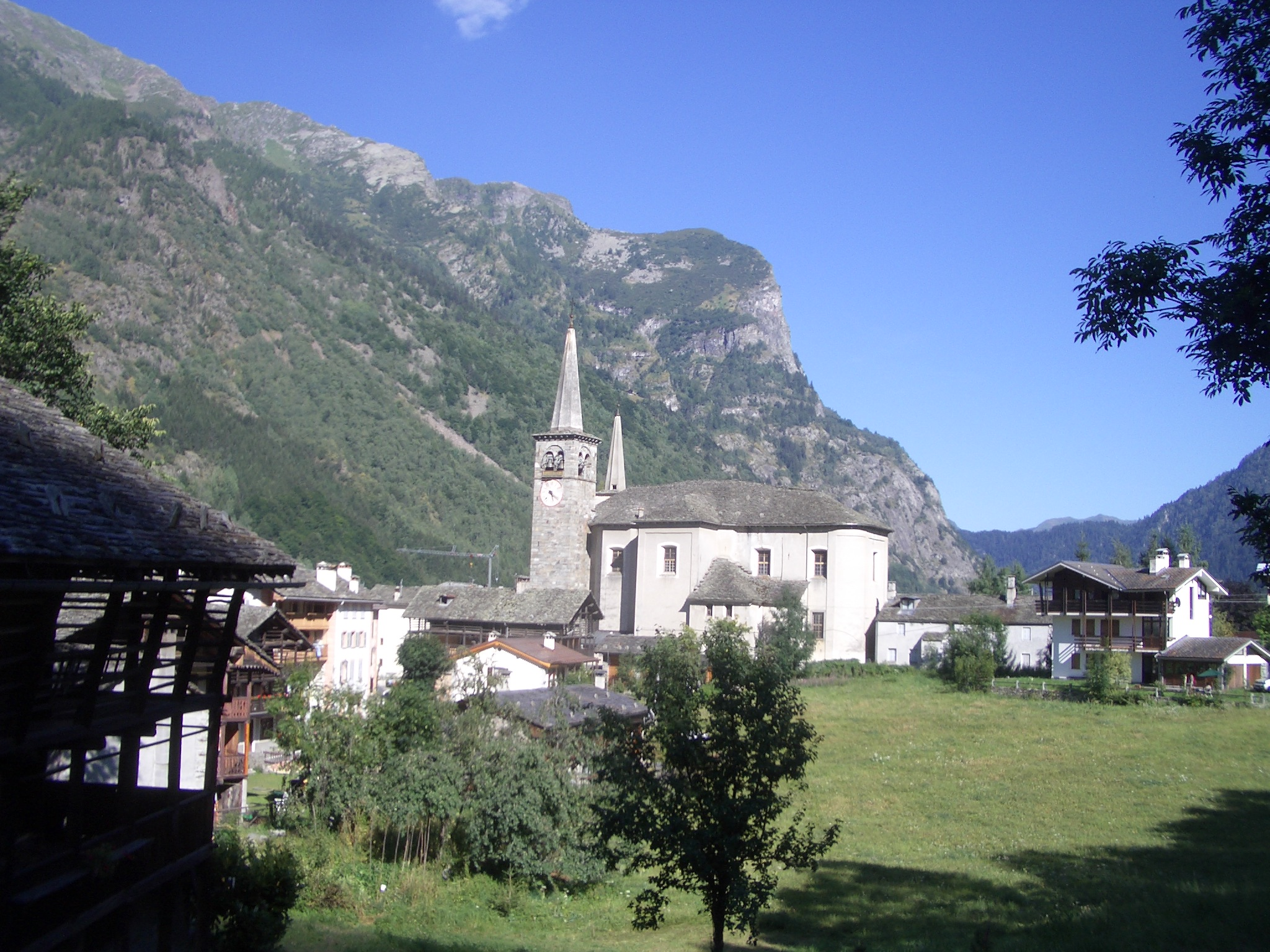

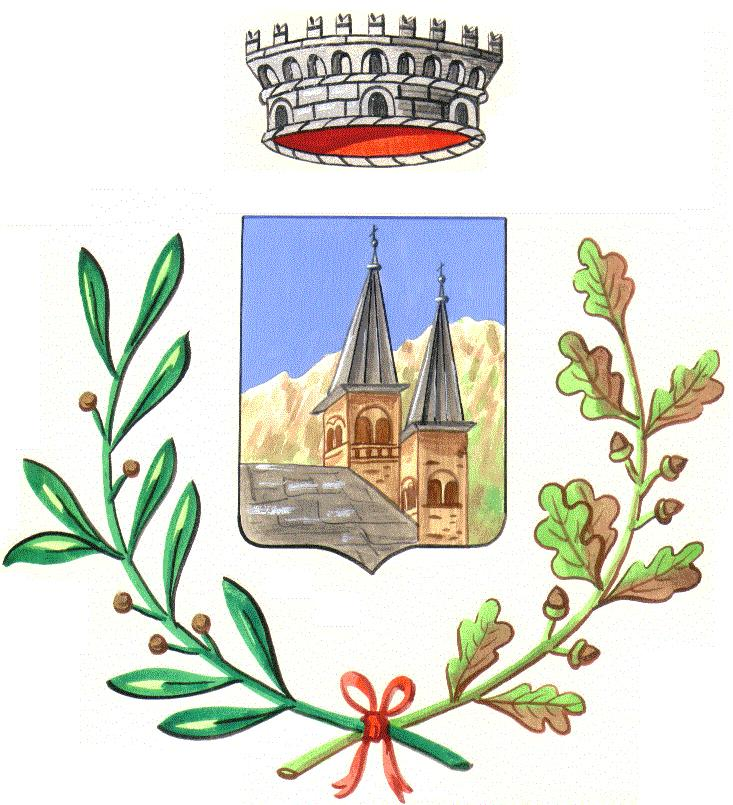
- Coat of arms

- Location of Riva Valdobbia in Italy
- Coordinates: 45°49′58.6″N 7°57′13.5″E
- Country: Italy
- Region: Piedmont
- Province: Vercelli (VC)
- Comune: Alagna Valsesia

Area
  - Total: 61.14 km^{2} (23.61 sq mi)
- Elevation: 1,112 m (3,648 ft)

Population (28 February 2017)
  - Total: 265
  - Density: 4.33/km^{2} (11.2/sq mi)
- Demonym: Rivesi
- Time zone: UTC+1 (CET)
  - Summer (DST): UTC+2 (CEST)
- Postal code: 13020
- Dialing code: 0163
- Patron saint: Saint Michael the Archangel
- Saint day: September 29 (Fair usually moved to nearest Sunday)
- Website: Official website

Riva Valdobbia (Walser German: Riifu, Piedmontese: La Riva) is a fraction in the Province of Vercelli in the Italian region Piedmont, located about 90 kilometres (56 mi) north of Turin and about 70 kilometres (43 mi) northwest of Vercelli. It's an Italian town of 265 inhabitants located in the upper Valsesia, in the province of Vercelli, in Piedmont.

From 1 January 2019 it ceased to exist for the incorporation in the neighboring municipality of Alagna Valsesia.

== Geography ==
The fraction of Riva Valdobbia is near the end of the Valsesia, the main Sesia Valley. It is a touristic place with a cross-country ski ring and an ice car track during the winter.

It is known to be the only town where the south-east side of the Monte Rosa. Mollia, the town downriver, is behind a bend of the valley.

West of Riva Valdobbia town, opens the Val Vogna, a side valley just in part served by paved road, on the old so-called Antica via d'Aosta "ancient Aosta Track", that united Riva Valdobbia with Gressoney-Saint-Jean through the colle di Valdobbia, the Valdobbia Pass.

=== Etymology of toponymics ===
The name Riva is a common toponymic in Italy and easy to explain: the main town is on the edge of a cliff overlooking the crossing of the Sesia river and the Vogna torrent; thus it is on a steep slope, a Riva

It is a popular belief that Valdobbia came from emigration traditions of seasonal works in France through the "Ancient Aosta Track". Families went up the Vogna Valley as Vanno in obbia, going to the balcony (obbia=Lobbia=Loggia), to see if the head of their household was coming back through the pass: hence the Valdobbia pass. That tradition was even supported by Tonetti, a local historian, while "Valdobbia" name existed well before the local people started to move regularly through the valley.

De Saussure supposed the name val-dobbia came from the French doubler, overpass. Before that, Amé Gorret offered the translation of Val Dubbia, the valley in doubt, contended between the people of Gressoney and Valsesian—the border between the two went back and forth during history.

The most ancient document so far found about the places gave probably the easiest answer: in 1251, Walser pioneers got permission to colonize the ground they could find going behind the mountain pass above 'Valdobbia', the still existing hamlet of Verdobio just downriver on the opposite side of the main town of Gressoney-Saint-Jean.

== History ==
Riva Valdobbia was a seasonal pasture area in the summer from ancient time and vaguely named Pietre Gemelle, the Twin Stones, as the main landmark of the plain are two blocks, still there at the north end of Riva.

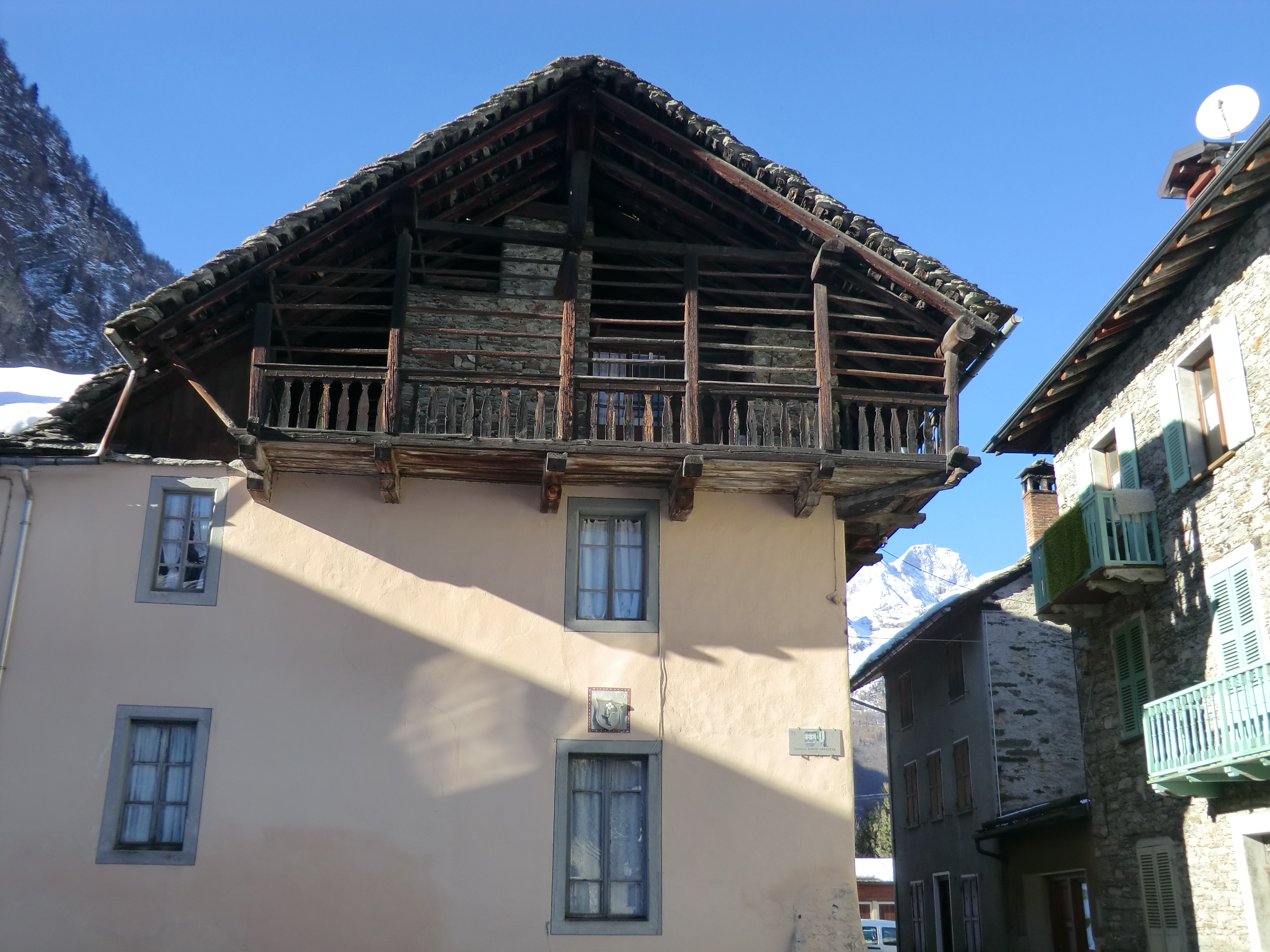
Example of mixed architecture: "Italian" stone house with typical Walser "Lobbia" balconies on top.

The settlement became permanent and finally was detached from Scopa administration to form an independent parish in 1326, dedicated to Saint Micheal.

In that century, the first Walser colonizations took place: from Macugnaga and Gressoney, populations of German language got permission to settle in the higher ground of the area with their typical small independent hamlets of few houses with community oven, fountain and a small chapel. Those hamlets was (still are) a short distance one from the other, forming a sort of larger community both in the Vogna Valley and in the area nowadays named Alagna as a modification of "Im-land", "the country/land".

Soon after, the Walsers pretended to have a priest in their own language instead of attending to the "Italian" parish church in Riva: the St.John church was built in the center of Alagna and created as a separate parish in 1475.

Riva Valdobbia was on the border of those two cultures and two languages, in a melting pot that did not work up too much between the Italians and the Germans, while the two communities were divided in separate administrations or consolidated in the old “Pietre Gemelle” back and forth during centuries.

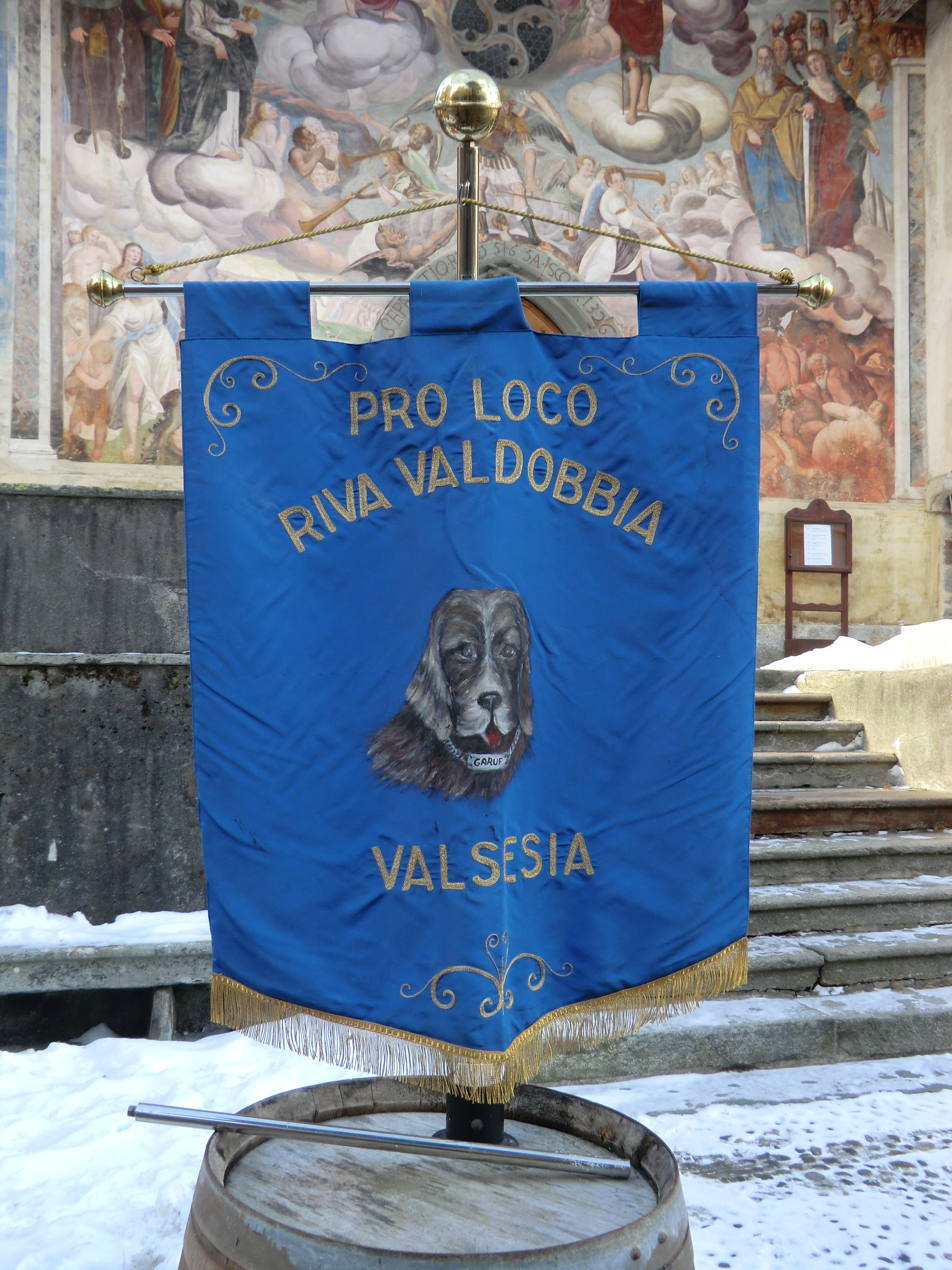
The "Garuf", the hunting dog symbol of Riva Valdobbia community, on an old banner/standard of the Pro Loco organization.

The well-known distrust between the two communities is still there in local traditions: an old saying is that the Riva's dog guards the Alagna's pig to get to and eat the Vogna Savoy cabbages—in other versions, to get to the Mollia's Raviciooin, another kind of cabbage.

The heraldic symbol of dog, vigilant and loyal to the power, was associated to Riva but was never official—the seal of the municipality bears the two belfries of the church - but it is still present in local popular culture as the Garuf, the local term for "hunting dog", mainly shown as symbol of the local carnival opposed to the "Swine", Alagna's mask, a pig.

=== Plague ===
Riva Valdobbia was largely on the fringe of the main history, and the few armed clashes over the Valdobbia pass were mostly tied to small local lords, while the overlord changed and acquired or lost power of that obscure portion of their domain with few real effects on population.

In 1630 Riva was hit hard by the plague—the only town in Valsesia. With 240 deaths in 17 months, several Rivesi became Monatti, corpse carriers and their services were required also in the area around Biella.

=== Napoleonic Wars ===
On 20 May 1800, about 400 Austrian soldiers cut out by the Napoleon's Army thrust via the Aosta Valley run away through the Colle Valdobbia pass. Few days later, 27 May 1800 a French unit of 2,561 soldiers and cavalrymen followed the same path, stopped briefly at "La Peccia" than stormed south down the valley to clash with a small Austrian rearguard (the so-called "Battle of Varallo") and then rejoined their main force coming down Simplon Pass, via Orta and Sesto Calende.

From those days, the small stone bridge over the Rissuolo torrent was the "Napoleonic bridge", or "Napoleon's bridge"—while for sure not built by that recon force in hot pursuit, the bridge was probably one of the works done in the brief Napoleonic administration of the north of Italy—the same that moved the cemetery out of town.

== Main sights ==
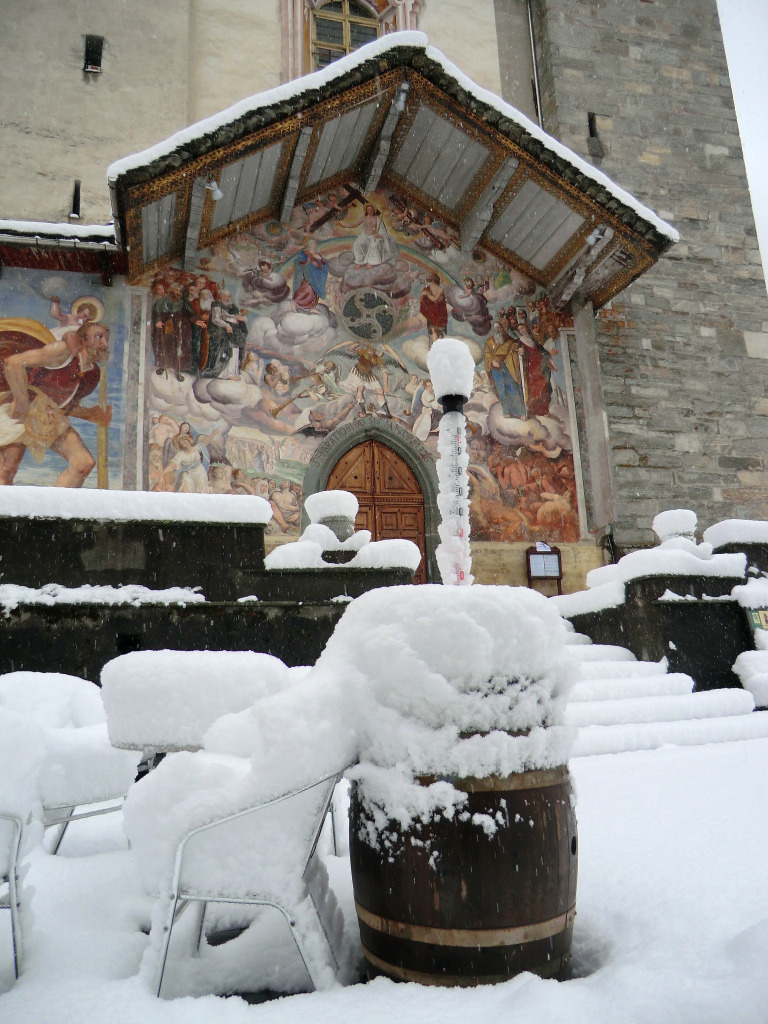
The Universal Judgement fresco on Saint Micheal parish church.

The Saint Michael the Archangel parish church is unique with the two belfries on a prominent position on the Riva, the knob overlooking the valley.

The Universal Judgement fresco was a National Monument.
