= Silvio Mondinelli =

Italian mountaineer

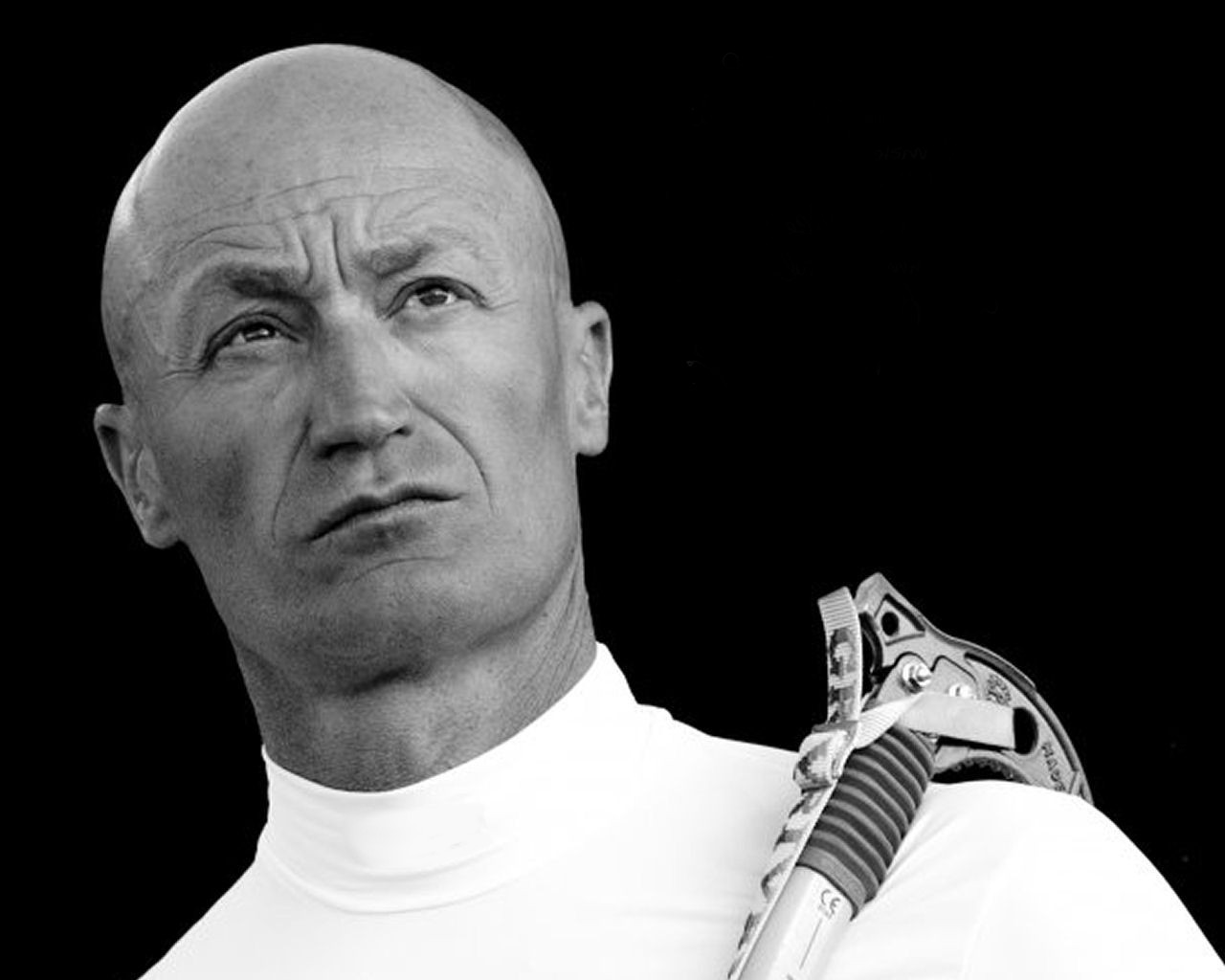
Mondinelli in 2012

Silvio Mondinelli (born 24 June 1958) is an Italian climber. In 2007, he became the 13th person to climb the 14 eight-thousanders. He is the 6th person to achieve that feat without using supplemental oxygen and the first mountaineer to climb the Seven Summits and the 14 eight-thousanders.

Broad Peak was the last peak he conquered.

== Career ==
In five months in 2001, he climbed four 8,000 meter peaks: Everest, Gasherbrum I, Gasherbrum II and Dhaulagiri. On 25 July 2004 he reached the peak of K2 (8611 m) and declared the success of the "K2 2004–50 years later" expedition.

During Mondinellil's expeditions he has rescued other climbers, often risking the success of his own expedition.

Mondinelli, along with a team of expert mountaineers, climbers and researchers, founded High Mountain University in Alagna Valsesia, Piedmont, the first high mountain school open to all upland aficionados.

== Notable summits ==
- 1979. Mount Kosciuszko, (2228m)
- 1981. Kilimanjaro, (5895m)
- 1984. Puskan T'urpu, North Face (6090m)
- 1990. Elbrus (5642m)
- 1993. Manaslu, South Face (8163m)
- 1994. Denali (6194m)
- 1996. Shisha Pangma (8013m)
- 1997. Aconcagua (6962m) – Cho Oyu (8201m)
- 2000. Ama Dablam (6812m)
- 2001. Mount Everest South slope (8848m) – Gasherbrum II (8035m) – Gasherbrum I (8068m) – Dhaulagiri (8156m)
- 2002. Makalu (8463m)
- 2003. Kanchenjunga (8586m)
- 2004. K2 (8611m)
- 2005. Nanga Parbat (8125m)
- 2006. Shisha Pangma Main (8027m) – Lhotse (8516m) – Annapurna (8091m)
- 2007. Broad Peak (8047m).
- 2008. Puncak Jaya (4884m)
- 2010. Mount Everest North slope (8848m).
- 2011. Vinson Massif (4892m)

== Honors ==
- 5th Class / Knight (Cavaliere) Order of Merit of the Italian Republic.
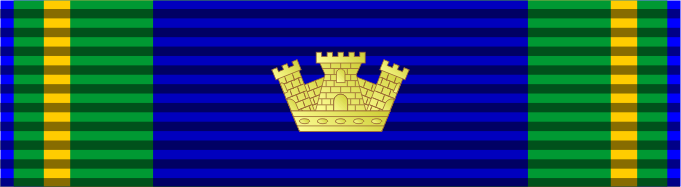
- Gold Cross / Order of Merit of the Guardia di Finanza.

== See also ==
- List of climbers, alpinists and mountaineers
- List of Mount Everest summiters by number of times to the summit
