= Alagna Valsesia =

- Comune
- Comune di Alagna Valsesia
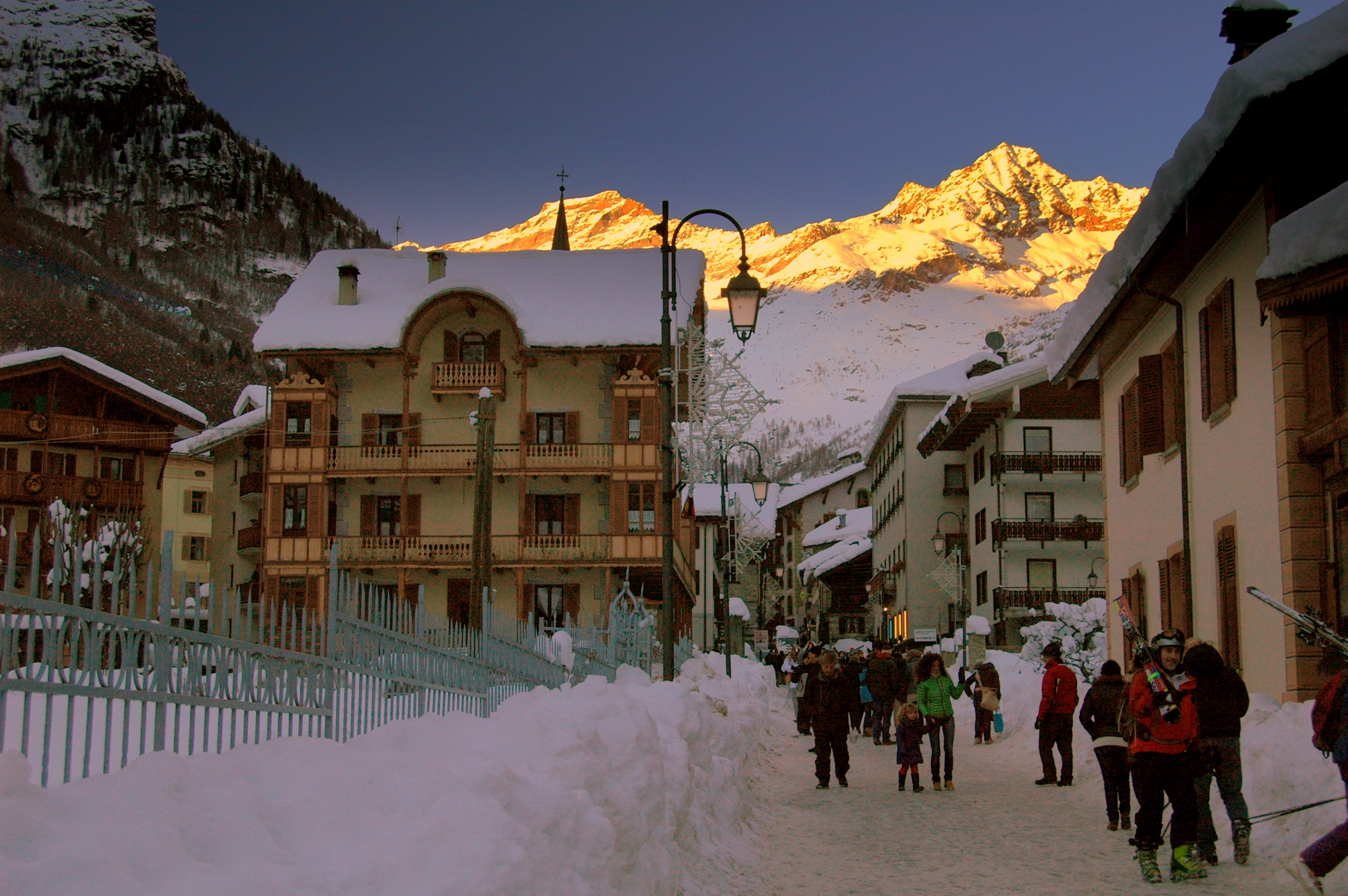
- Alagna Valsesia's main street

- Coat of arms

- Location of Alagna Valsesia in Italy Alagna Valsesia (Piedmont)
- Coordinates: 45°51′14″N 7°56′14″E
- Country: Italy
- Region: Piedmont
- Province: Vercelli (VC)
- Frazioni: Dorf, Fum d'Boudma, Fum Diss, Fum Tschukke, Fun d'Rùfinu, Im Adelstodal, Im Felleretsch, Im Garrài, Im Oubre Grobe, Im Oubre Rong, Im Rong, Im Undre Grobe, Im Wold, In d'Bundu, In d'Ekku, In d'Follu, In d'Mèrlette, In d'Stütz, In d'Weng, In d'Wittine, Purratz Hus, Scarpia, Uttershus, Wittwosma, Z'am Steg, Zar Chilchu, Zar Sogu, Z'Jakmuls Hus, Z'Kantmud, Z'Pudelenn, Z'San Niklòs, Z'Yuassis Hus

Government
  - Mayor: Roberto Veggi

Area
  - Total: 72.04 km^{2} (27.81 sq mi)
- Elevation: 1,154 m (3,786 ft)

Population (28 February 2017)
  - Total: 432
  - Density: 6.00/km^{2} (15.5/sq mi)
- Demonym: Alagnesi
- Time zone: UTC+1 (CET)
  - Summer (DST): UTC+2 (CEST)
- Postal code: 13021
- Dialing code: 0163
- Patron saint: St. John the Baptist
- Website: Official website

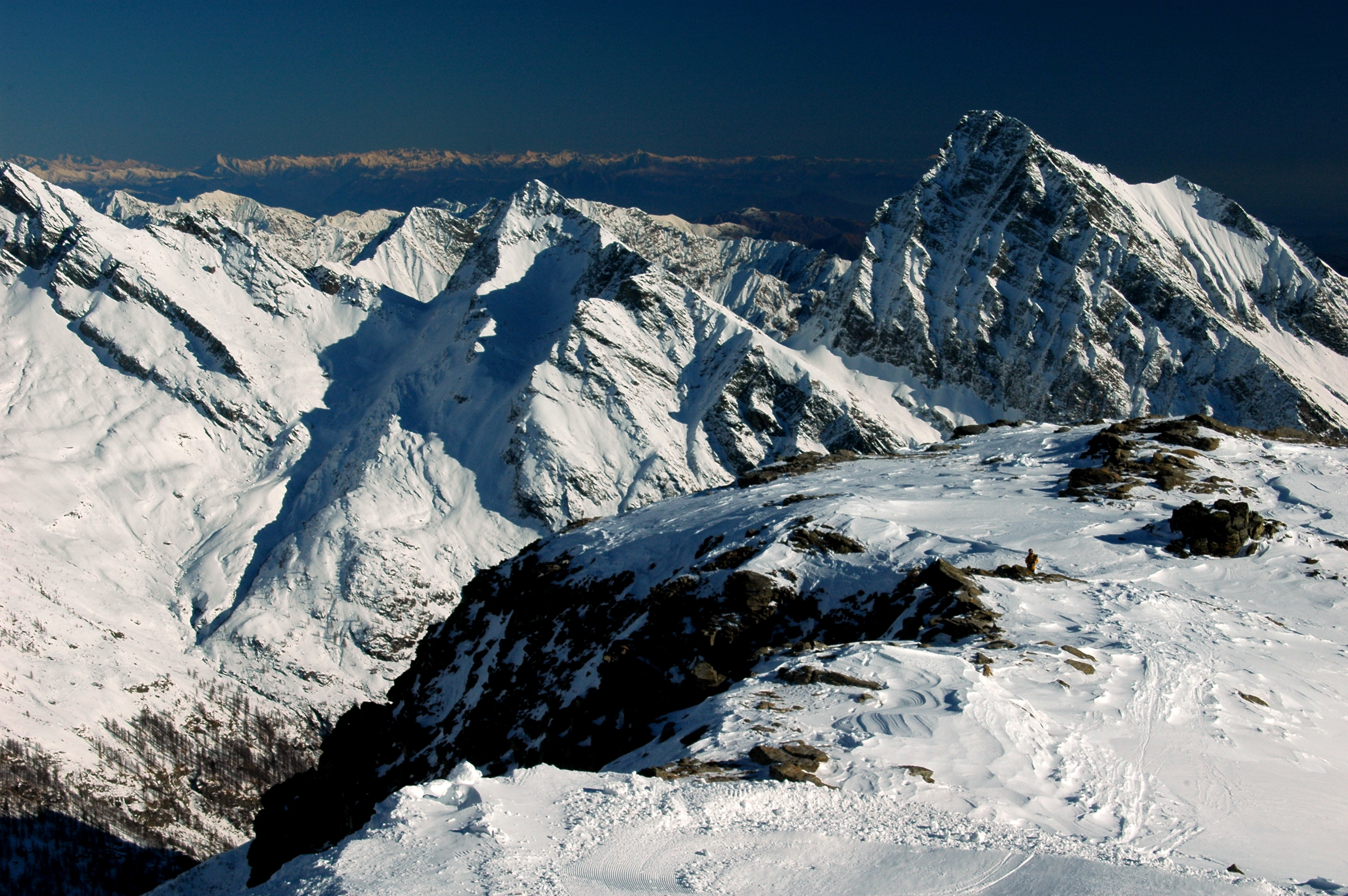
Tagliaferro 2,964 metres (9,724 ft) from passo dei Salati

Alagna Valsesia (Walser German: Im Land, Piedmontese: Alagna, Valsesiano: Lagna) is a comune and small village high in the Valsesia alpine valley in the province of Vercelli, Piedmont, northern Italy, a UNESCO World heritage site since 2013. It is a tourist place for mountaineering and winter sports, and it is internationally renowned for the freeride off-piste skiing. It is also the traditional starting point for the Margherita Hut climb, at 4,554 metres (14,941 ft) above sea level, the highest building in Europe. It was originally settled by Walser at the beginning of the 12th century. It is located at an elevation of 1,191 metres (3,907 ft) just south of the Monte Rosa, elevation 4,638 metres (15,217 ft) (the second tallest peak in the Alps); It is very close to Milan (130 kilometres (81 mi)) and to the international Milan–Malpensa Airport (106 kilometres (66 mi)).

Since December 2005 a cable car connects Alagna with Gressoney (AO) through the Passo dei Salati.

== History ==
Founded in the 13th century by a German population ("Walser") who arrived from the north and settled in the Italian alpine areas around Monte Rosa, the settlements preserved today include several traditional buildings built around 1500–1600 in a pure "Walser Style", still in perfect condition, built using local wood and stones (called 'Piode'). This vernacular architecture has been totally preserved: the wooden rails around the building was in fact invented for hanging and drying the hay.

== Main sights ==
The Church of Saint John the Baptist was built in 1511 and it has preserved many sculptures by Giovanni d'Enrico a famous Italian artist (1559–1644).

At the entrance of the town, there is the native house of Tanzio da Varallo (1575–1633), brother of Giovanni d'Enrico and one of the most famous Italian artists. His works are in the most prestigious art gallery in the world.

== Mountaineering ==
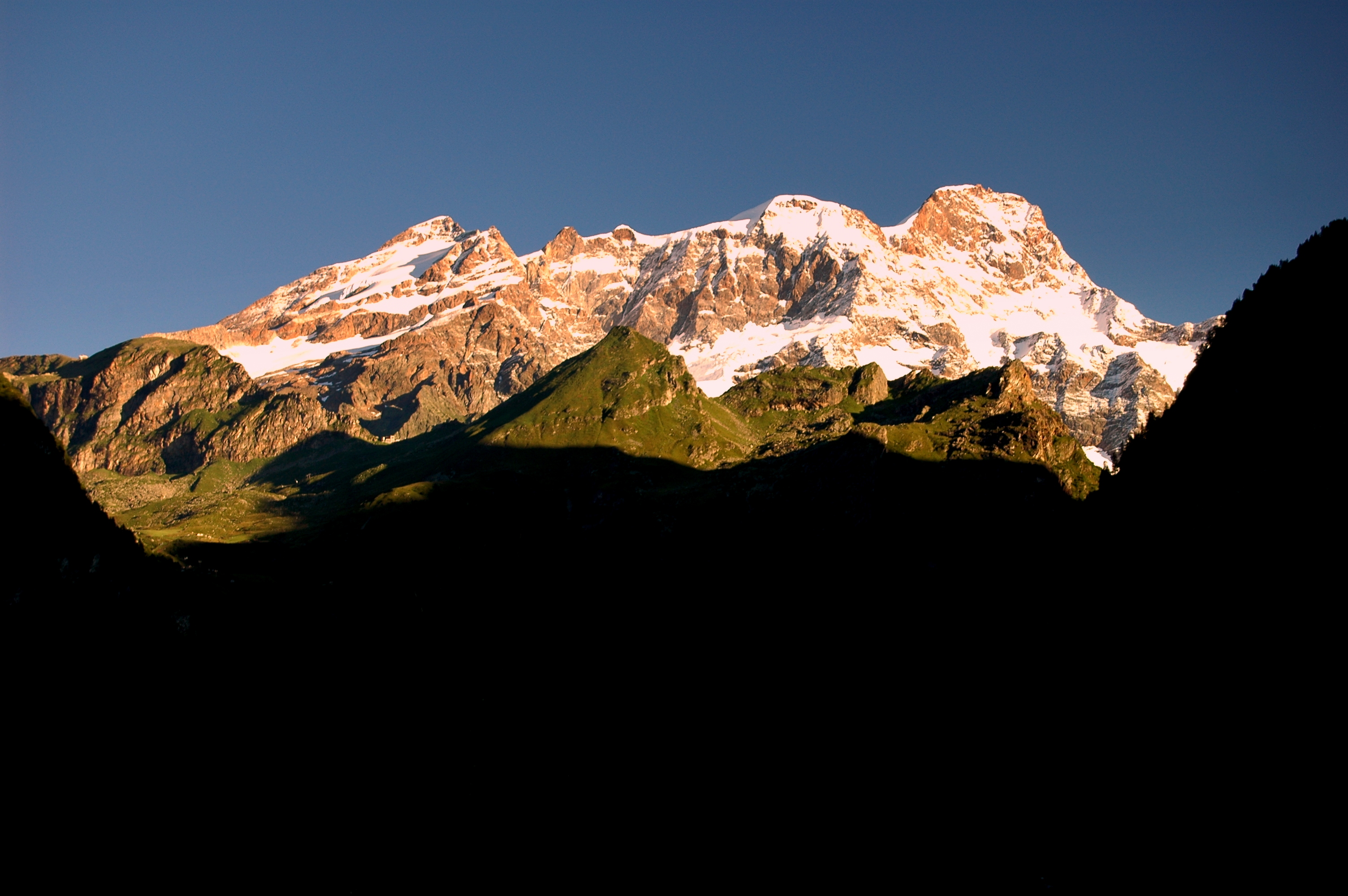
The Monte Rosa just before Alagna

Alagna is one of the Alpine towns which have played a crucial role in the history of mountaineering. The Guides Association was founded in 1872 and it is the oldest in Italy second only to that of Courmayeur (1868). From the town started all the first expeditions on the close Monte Rosa; the first one was on 23 July 1801 when Pietro Giordani, a native of Alagna, reached the summit of the peak which now is called by his name (Giordani peak, 4,046 metres (13,274 ft)). In 1819 Zumstein reached the third-highest Monte Rosa peak (Zumstein peak, 4,563 metres (14,970 ft)). Finally between August the 8th and the 9th, the Alagna parish priest, reached, after three attempts, the fourth tallest peak of Monte Rosa and the highest in the Alagna Valley, the today called Gnifetti Peak (4,559 metres (14,957 ft)).

The mountaineering tradition is still alive: Silvio Mondinelli, the second Italian climber to reach all the 14 8,000 metres (26,000 ft) peaks of the world, has done several climbs on the Alagna side of Monte Rosa. In September 2011, Hervè Barmasse and his father opened a new route on the south-east face of the Gnifetti peak 4,559 metres (14,957 ft), which is at the moment the most difficult route on this side of the massif and one of the most challenging in the entire group (800+ metres (2,600+ ft), VI, ED). Finally, Alagna is the starting point for reaching the Margherita hut, the highest hut in Europe, on the Gnifetti Peak top (4,559 metres (14,957 ft)).

== Freeride world capital ==
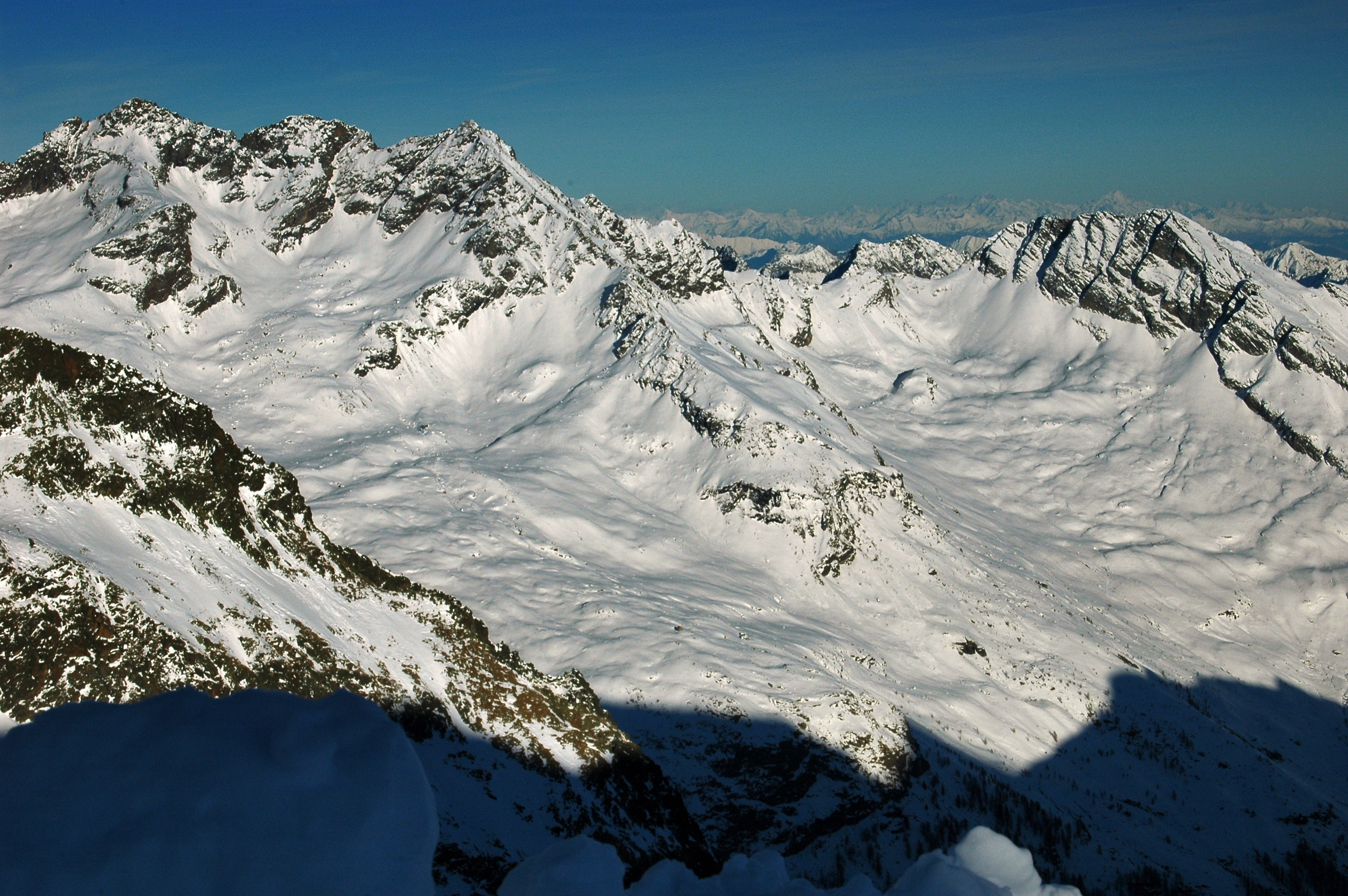
Valsesia Valley seen from the Passo dei Salati 2,980 metres (9,780 ft).

Alagna is internationally known for being the freeride capital of the Alps. The reason for this great quantity of routes is in the particular morphological shape of the main valley, steep but at the same time with several lateral smaller valleys "Comb shape" which permit huge exploitation of the territory. Plus, thanks to the difference in height from the top of the ridges (Monte Rosa is 4,634 metres (15,203 ft)) to the bottom of the valley (Alagna itself is only at 1,191 metres (3,907 ft)), most routes cover a huge slope. The landscape is wild, severe and very impressive. The majority of the itineraries are around the Punta Giordani 4,046 metres (13,274 ft) and the wild area of the Malfatta 2,914 metres (9,560 ft). Rides include that of Balma, which crosses the entire Bors Valley from Indren (3,260 metres (10,700 ft)) to Pastore Hut 1,575 metres (5,167 ft), and the alternatives routes starting from Passo dei Salati (2,979 metres (9,774 ft)): Canale a Y, Canale Rettilineo, Canale Obliquo, Canale Longhez, all around the 45°. There are other itineraries in the Otro Valley (Passo Zube S3+, Passo della Coppa S3+, Canale Jschechette S4+), close to Corno Bianco (3,320 metres (10,890 ft)). By Eliski itineraries include Il Cavallo (starting point around 3,600 metres (11,800 ft)), Rizzetti and Il Turlo. Extreme rides are Perazzi Couloir along Punta Parrot (4,436 metres (14,554 ft), 55°) and Sesia Couloir (60° and 65° close to the ridge) between Punta Gnifetti (4,559 metres (14,957 ft)) and Punta Parrot.

== Skiing in Alagna Valsesia: the Monterosa ski resort ==
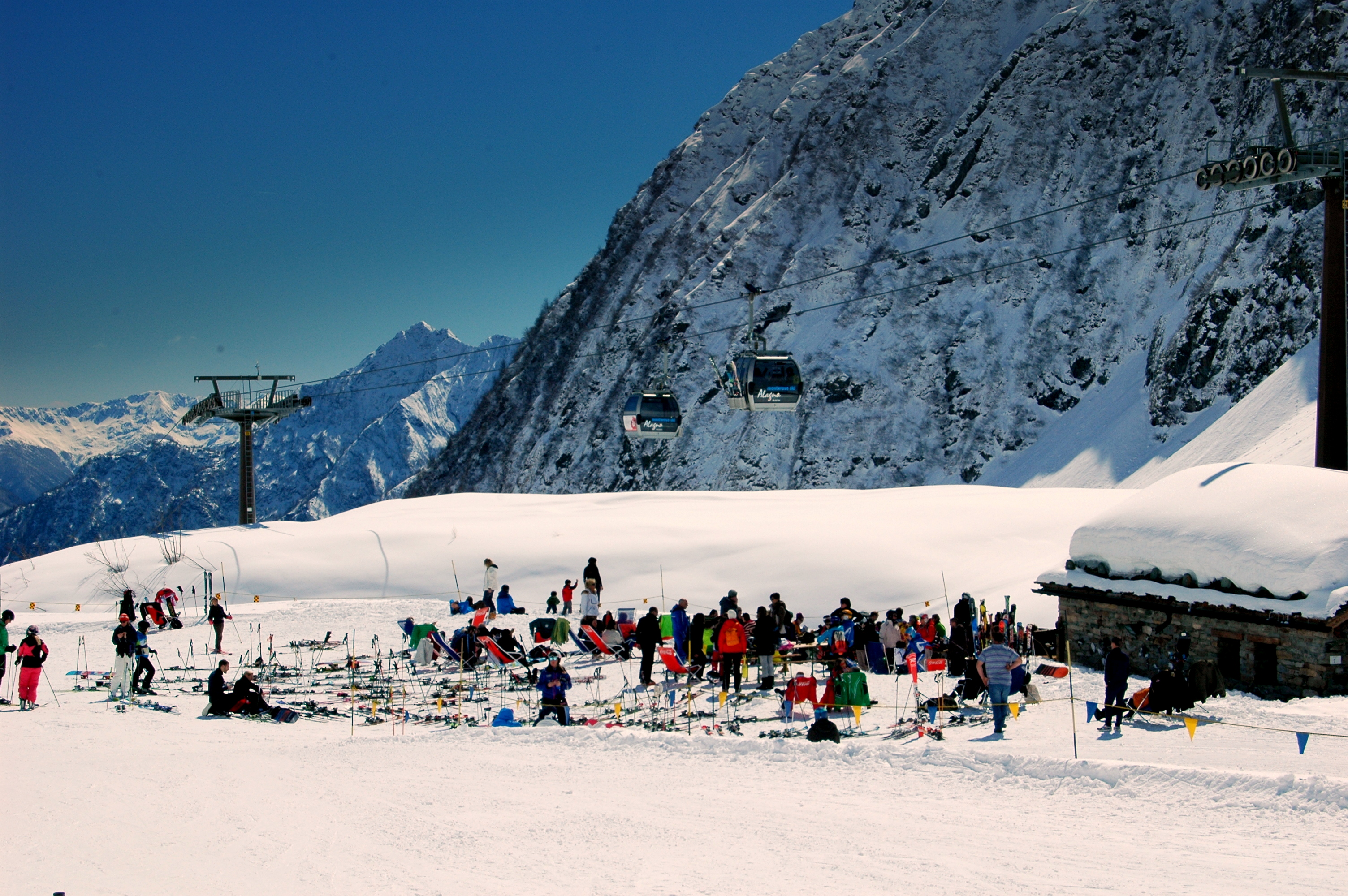
Telecabina Alagna Valsesia 1200m - Pianalunga 2050m

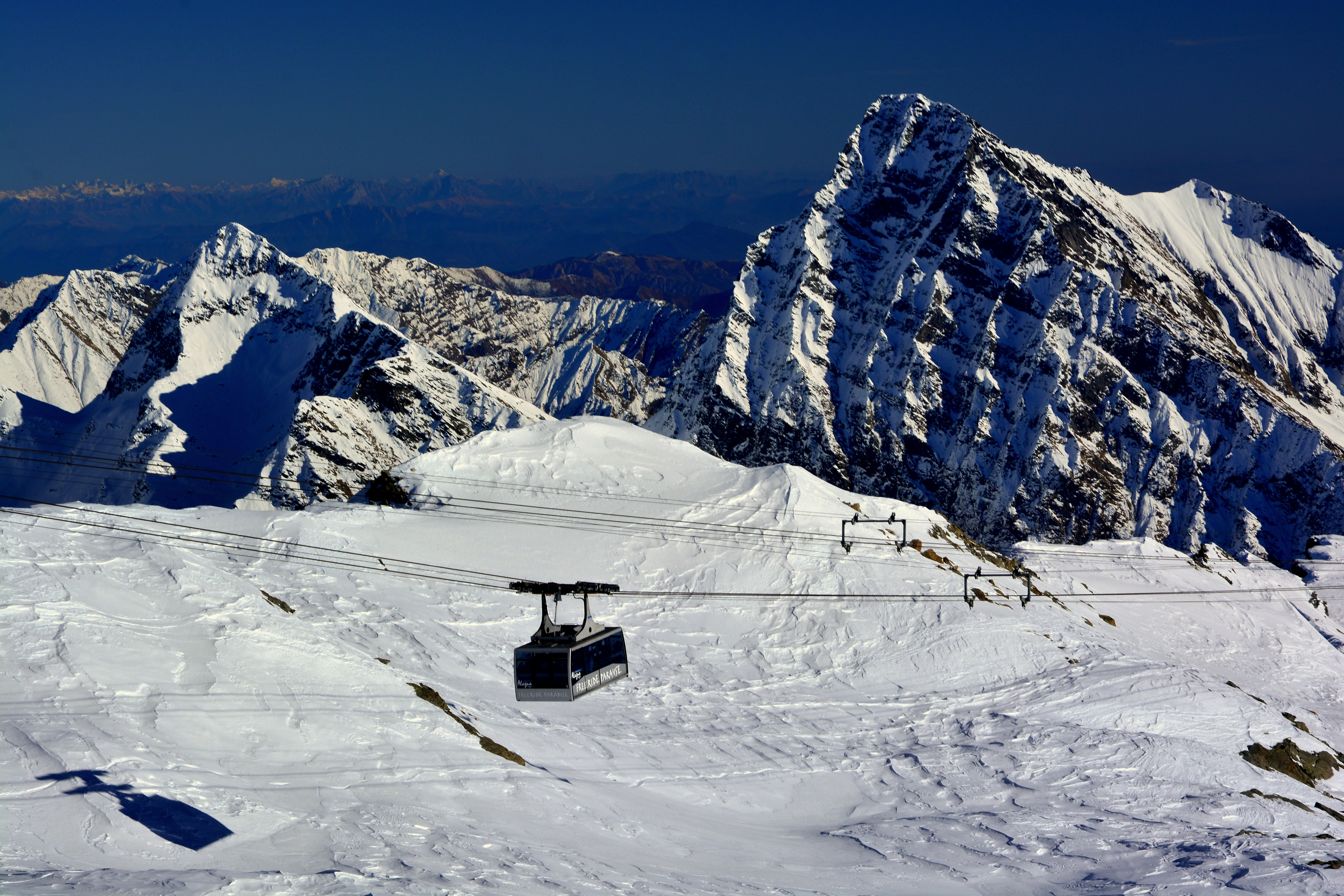
Alagna Valsesia, Funifor Salati

Alagna Valsesia is part of the huge Monterosa Ski area, a ski-resort at the feet of Monte Rosa which connects three different valleys in Piedmont and in Aosta Valley, with 180 km of runs. Through Passo dei Salati at an elevation of 2,980 metres (9,780 ft), Alagna is connected with Gressoney-La-Trinité and Champoluc. Since 2017, a new chair lift, brings from Cimalegna at an elevation of 3,030 metres (9,940 ft) just above the Passo dei Salati permitting direct access to the freerides routes in the Vallone delle Pisse.
