= Buisson =

Buisson is a French surname and place name. It may refer to:

== People ==
- Ada Buisson (1839–1866), English author and novelist
- Alexandre Buisson (1886–1939), French World War I flying ace
- Émile Buisson (1902–1956), French gangster
- Ferdinand Buisson (1841–1932), French academic and Radical-Socialist politician
- François Albert-Buisson (1881–1961), French entrepreneur, economist, politician, historian
- Henri Buisson (1873–1944), French physicist
- Irène du Buisson de Longpré (died 1767), French noble, mistress to Louis XV of France
- Jean-François Buisson de Saint-Cosme (1667–1706), Canadian missionary,
- John Du Buisson (1871–1938), English Anglican priest
- Louis Léon Marie André Buisson (1889–1945), French Major General
- Marion Buisson (born 1988), French pole vaulter
- Patrick Buisson (born 1949), French historian, journalist and political advisor
- Robert du Mesnil du Buisson (1895–1986), French historian, soldier, and archaeologist
- Suzanne Buisson (1883–1944), French political activist and résistante
- Virginie Buisson (born 1969), French tennis player

== Places ==
- Buisson (crater), lunar crater on the far side of the Moon named after physicist Henri Buisson
- Buisson, Vaucluse, commune in the Vaucluse department, France
- Canton of Le Buisson-de-Cadouin, former canton in the Dordogne department, France
- Le Buisson (disambiguation), any of several communes in France
- Verrières-le-Buisson, commune in the southern suburbs of Paris
- Villons-les-Buissons, commune in the Calvados department, France
