= Canton of Le Buisson-de-Cadouin =

Coordinates: 44°49′N 0°53′E

Le Buisson-de-Cadouin
- Former canton
- Interactive map of Le Buisson-de-Cadouin
- Country: France
- Region: Nouvelle-Aquitaine
- Department: Dordogne
- No. of communes: {{{nbcomm}}}
- Disbanded: 2015
- Area: 127.49 km^{2} (49.22 sq mi)
- Population (2012): 3,849
  - Density: 30.19/km^{2} (78.19/sq mi)

The Canton of Le Boussin-de-Cadouin is a former canton of the Dordogne département, in France. It was disbanded following the French canton reorganisation which came into effect in March 2015. It consisted of 8 communes, which joined the canton of Lalinde in 2015. It had 3,849 inhabitants (2012).

The lowest point is 35 m in the commune of Badefols-sur-Dordogne, the highest point is in Le Buisson-de-Cadouin at 248 m, the average elevation is 85 m. The most populated commune was Le Buisson-de-Cadouin with 2,086 inhabitants (2012).

== Communes ==
The canton comprised the following communes:

- Alles-sur-Dordogne
- Badefols-sur-Dordogne
- Bouillac
- Le Buisson-de-Cadouin
- Calès
- Molières
- Pontours
- Urval

== Population history ==
Year	Population
1962	3,596
1968	3,730
1975	3,517
1982	3,504
1990	3,521
1999	3,629

== See also ==
- Cantons of the Dordogne department
