= Arslan Tash amulets =

Talisman excavated in Syria

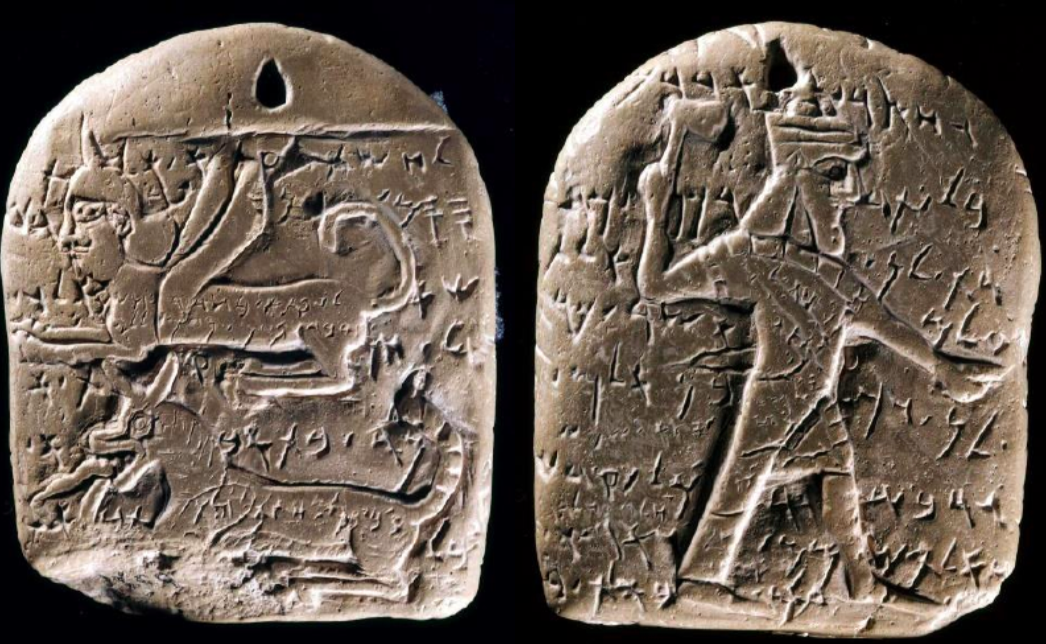
Arslan Tash amulet

The Arslan Tash amulets are Assyrian talismans found at Arslan Tash (Turkish: Arslan Taş, literally "Lion Stone") in northwest Syria, the site of ancient Hadatu. They are to be distinguished from larger finds such as the Arslan Tash reliefs. The inscriptions on the tablets are known as KAI 27.

== Discovery ==
In 1933, Robert du Mesnil du Buisson purchased from a peasant two inscribed limestone plaques "Arslan Tash 1" ("AT1") and the smaller "Arslan Tash 2" ("AT2") which are now in the National Museum of Aleppo. His drawings and photographs of AT1 were published in 1939. Count du Mesnil du Buisson made gypsum casts of the tablets, though these are now lost.

== Description ==
Since the small rectangular plaque had a hole in one end it was identified as an amulet. On the obverse is a lamassu (a winged lion with a human head, a talismanic figure) standing over a she-wolf with a scorpion's tail (a demonic figure) devouring a male or female figure. On the reverse is a marching god with late-Assyrian headgear carrying an axe instead of the expected lightning bolt.

The limestone plaque "AT1" includes incantations meant to deter demons from entering the household, and then appeals to such deities as Assur, Baal, Horon, and to Heaven and Earth.

Nevertheless, rather than 'Assur', some scholars interpret the inscription as referring to the female deity Asherah.

"Although other scholars like T. Caster (1942) proposed reading the first god-name as Asur rather than Asherah, Cross and Saley (1970:46) support the "Asherah" reading..."

Mesnil du Buisson and Caquot published AT2 in 1971. It shows a male demon, "m-z-h". It measures 53 by 33 mm. and contains short inscriptions on both sides that are written in the same language and script as the first amulet.

The two tablets were dated to the 7th century BC and they call upon the sons of Im to protect the amulet wearers from the male stragglers (Lamassu) and the female fliers (Lilith).

== Translations ==
Working from du Mesnil du Buisson's photographs, and in some cases casts, the text on the plaque "AT1" was translated from the Phoenician by Dupont-Sommer (1939), Albright (1939), Gaster (1942) (1947) Torczyner (1947), Cross and Saley (1970), Texidor (1971), Caquot (1973), and Röllig (1974).

The text includes a broken word lly- which with the addition of -t could possibly be analogous to the Hebrew Lilith, or ll wyn "night and day".

=== AT1 ===
Per Sperling.

(1)	LḤŠT Lʿ(P)Tʾ ʾLT	Incantation against the Fl(ye)rs: Conjuration of
(2)	SSM BN PDR	Sasom, son of Pidar,
(3)	Šʾ ʾLT	Pronounce the conjuration,
(4)	WLḤNQT ʾ-	and to the Stranglers, s-
(5)	-MR BT ʾBʾ	-ay, "(The) house I enter,
(6)	BL TBʾN	"you shall not enter.
(7)	WḤṢR ʾDRK	"The court I tread,
(8)	BL TDRKN K-	"you shall not tread.
(9)	-RT LN[W] ʾLT	"Eternal covenants were made for us
(10)	ʿLM ʾŠR KRT	"Aššur made them with
(11)	LN[W] WKL BN ʾLM	"u[s], as did every divinity
(12)	WRB DR KL QDŠN[W]	"and great one, (the) council of all o[ur] holy ones.
(13)	BʾLT ŠMM WʾRṢ ʿ-	"By the conjuration of (the) Heavens and the Earth, for-
(14)	-(D) ʿLM BʾLT BʿL	"-ever, by the conjuration of Baal,
(15)	(ZB)L ʾRṢ, BʾL(T)	"(princ)e of the Earth, by the conjurat(ion)
(16)	(ʾ)ŠT ḤWRN ʾŠ TM PY	"of Hauron's (w)ife, whose Word is true,
(17)	WŠBʿ ṢRTY WŠM-	"and her seven rivals too, and the ei-
(18)	-NH ʾŠT[M] BʿL Q(D)Š	"-ght wi[ves] of Ho(l)y Baal!"

Though Sperling ends his transcription at line 18, Häberl notes that the AT1 inscription continued for several more lines, which he transcribed as:

(19)	LʿPTʾ BḤDR ḤŠK	"To the Fliers in the dark chamber,
(20)	ʾBR PʿM PʿM LL Z	"pass by immediately this night!
(21)	...(B)BTY ḤṢ(T) HLK	"...(in) his house, destro(yer), go!
(22)	M(Nʿ)T LPY	"I have de(nied access) to the opening of
(23)	PTḤ-	"this doorway of h-
(24)	-Y Wʾ-	"-is, and lig-
(25)	-WR L-	"-ht to the
(26)	-MZZT YṢʾ ŠMŠ	"doorpost. The Sun is rising;
(27)	(K)SSM	"(like) a moth,
(28)	ḤLP WLD(R)	"vanish, and forever
(29)	ʿP	"fly!"

=== AT2 ===
Per Belnap:

(1)	LḤŠT LMZH BʿL	Incantation against the Splatterers: Baal
(2)	ʾŠR MRKBTY WRBʿN	harnessed his chariot, and "Great Eye"
(3)	ʾTY ʾLŠYY (Y)Ṣ[ʾ]	with him, ʾL ŠYY (we)nt out,
(4)	(K)ʾŠ BŠDH WGLʿN	(like) fire in the field, and "Round Eye" was
(5)	BŠDH ʾY ʾL-	in the field. Where is ʾL
(6)	-ŠYY QRŠ	ŠYY, (the) devourer/crusher?
(7)	NʿLT MNʿL	I bolted the bolt!
(8)	BRḤ ʿYN	Flee, Eye!
(9)	BDD BRʾŠ MGMR	Retreat from the head of the accomplisher of
(10)	BNT BRʾŠ ḤLM KY	understanding, from the head of the dreamer! For
(11)	HLMT ʿN BTM ʿNY YT-	whenever I strike the eye, in the destruction of the eye, destro-
(12)	-M ʿ(YN) NM	-yed are the two e(yes).
(13)	MNTY KMGLT	My incantations correspond to the scroll.

== Authenticity ==
The authenticity of the amulets AT1 and AT2 has been questioned, particularly by J. Teixidor and P. Amiet (1983), who examined the originals in the National Museum of Aleppo. However Jacobus van Dijk (1992) defends the tablets as genuine. Dennis Pardee (1998) leaves the matter open to question.

== See also ==
- Asherah
- Canaanite and Aramaic inscriptions

== Literature ==
- Willett, E. A. R. 1999. Women and household shrines in ancient Israel. PhD dissertation, University of Arizona.
