= Bouillac =

Bouillac is the name of several communes in France:

- Bouillac, Aveyron, in the Aveyron département
- Bouillac, Dordogne, in the Dordogne département
- Bouillac, Tarn-et-Garonne, in the Tarn-et-Garonne département
