= Le Buisson =

Le Buisson may refer to several communes in France:

- Le Buisson, former commune of the Calvados department, now part of Merville-Franceville-Plage
- Le Buisson, former commune of the Dordogne department, now part of Le Buisson-de-Cadouin
- Le Buisson, Lozère, in the Lozère department
- Le Buisson, Marne, in the Marne department
- Le Buisson-de-Cadouin, in the Dordogne department

== See also ==
- Buisson (disambiguation)
