= Vesalius (crater) =

Crater on the Moon

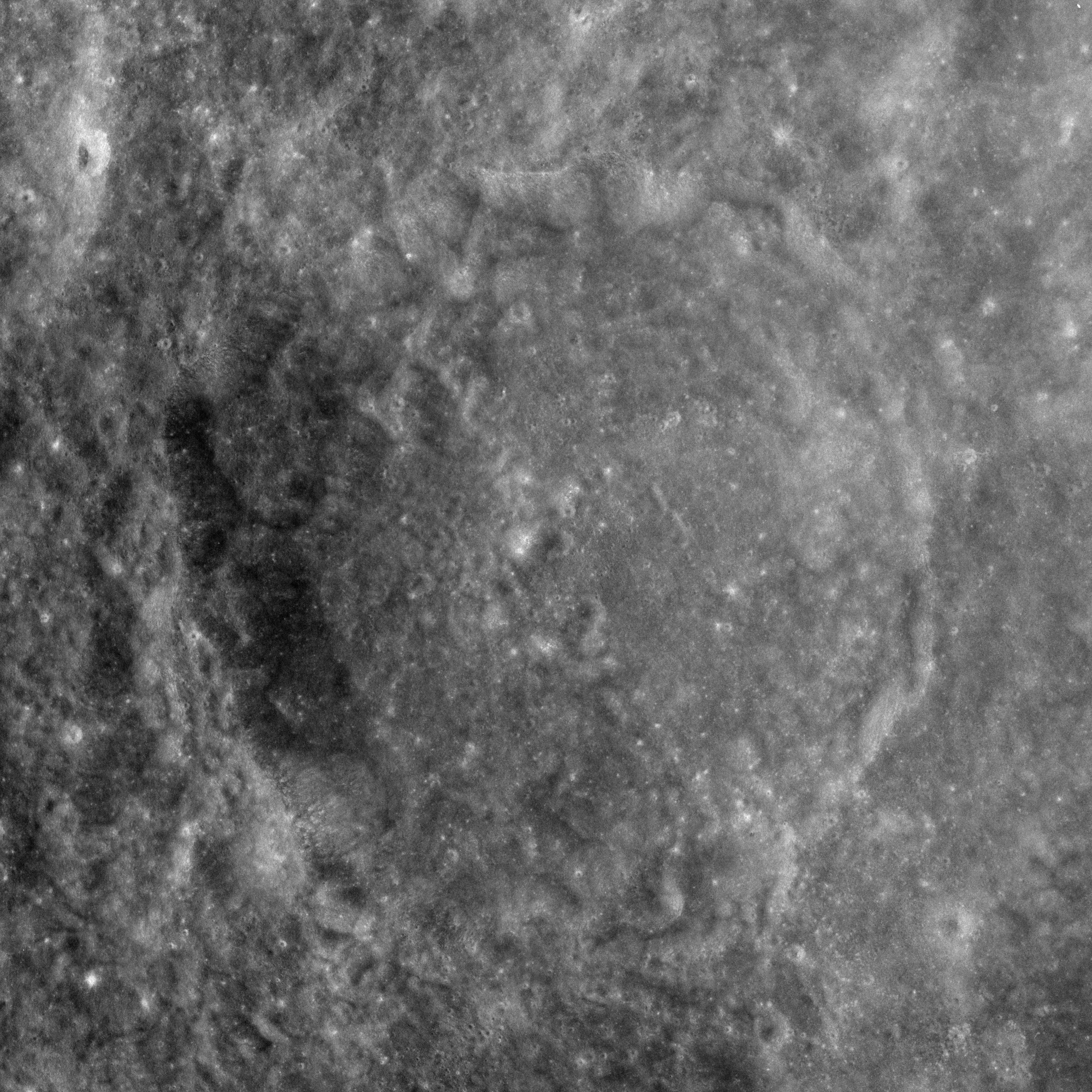
- Apollo 17 Mapping camera image
- Coordinates: 3.1°S 114.5°E
- Diameter: 61 km
- Colongitude: 246° at sunrise
- Eponym: Andreas Vesalius

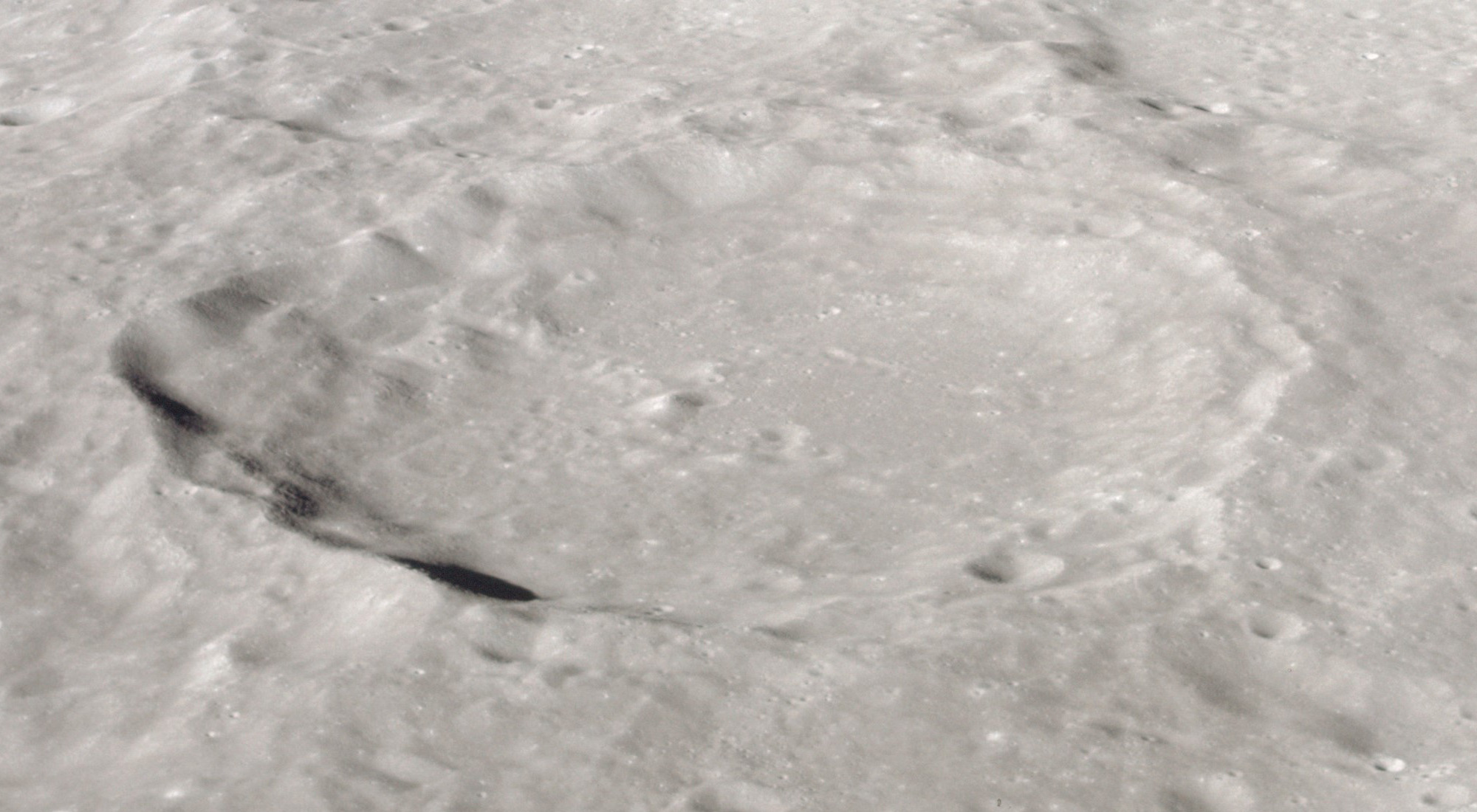
Oblique view from Apollo 12

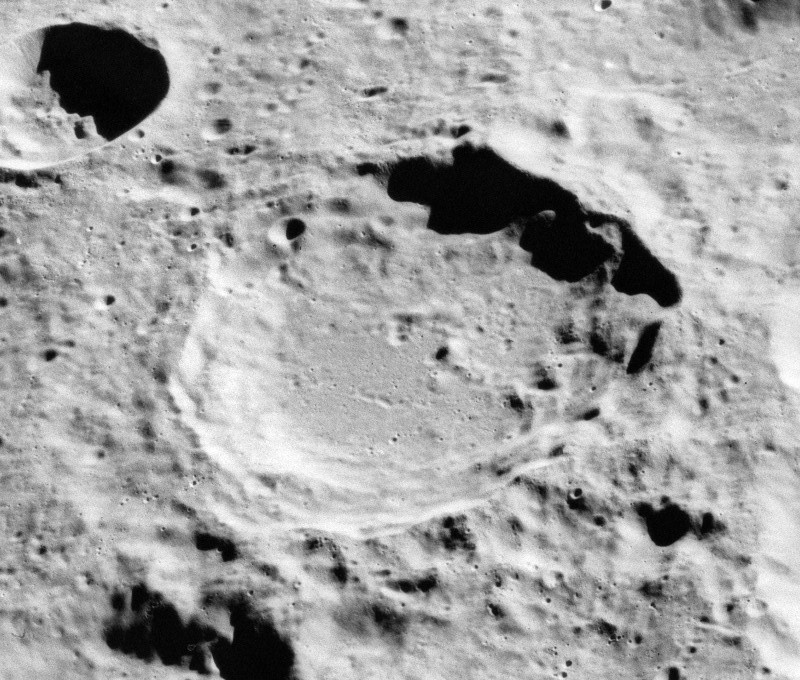
Oblique view from Apollo 16

Vesalius is a lunar impact crater that lies on the far side of the Moon, less than 100 kilometers south of the lunar equator. It was named after Flemish anatomist and physician Andreas Vesalius. Just to the northwest is the slightly smaller crater Buisson. Farther to the west-southwest lies the prominent crater Einthoven.

The outer rim of Vesalius is generally circular but somewhat irregular. There is an outward bulge at the southern extremity and a low rim at the northern end. The inner wall displays some slight terracing. On the interior floor the central peak is offset to the north, suggesting that the crater was formed by a low-angle impact.

== Satellite craters ==
By convention these features are identified on lunar maps by placing the letter on the side of the crater midpoint that is closest to Vesalius. The name Eskola was proposed for Vesalius M crater, and it is shown as such in some publications, but the name was not approved by the IAU.

| Vesalius | Latitude | Longitude | Diameter |
|---|---|---|---|
| C | 0.8° S | 116.7° E | 22 km |
| D | 2.2° S | 116.9° E | 50 km |
| G | 3.7° S | 117.3° E | 14 km |
| H | 3.9° S | 119.0° E | 36 km |
| J | 4.8° S | 119.1° E | 25 km |
| M | 5.7° S | 114.5° E | 31 k |

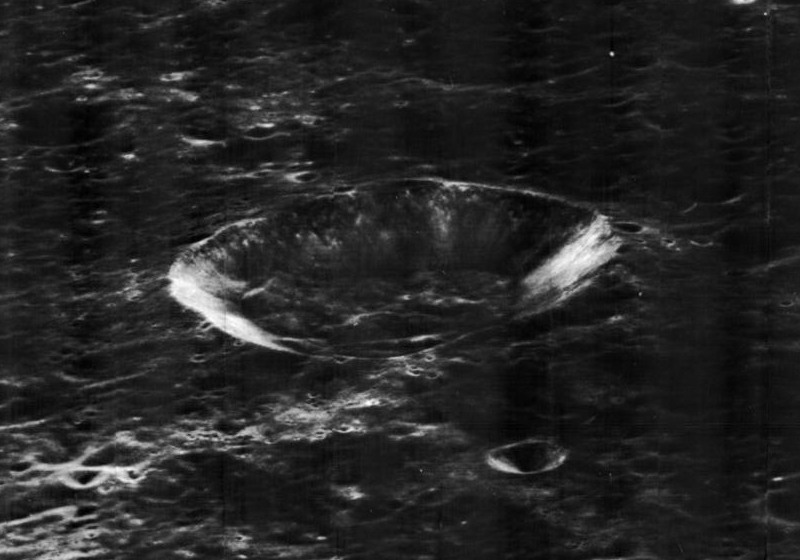
Oblique Lunar Orbiter 1 view of Vesalius M

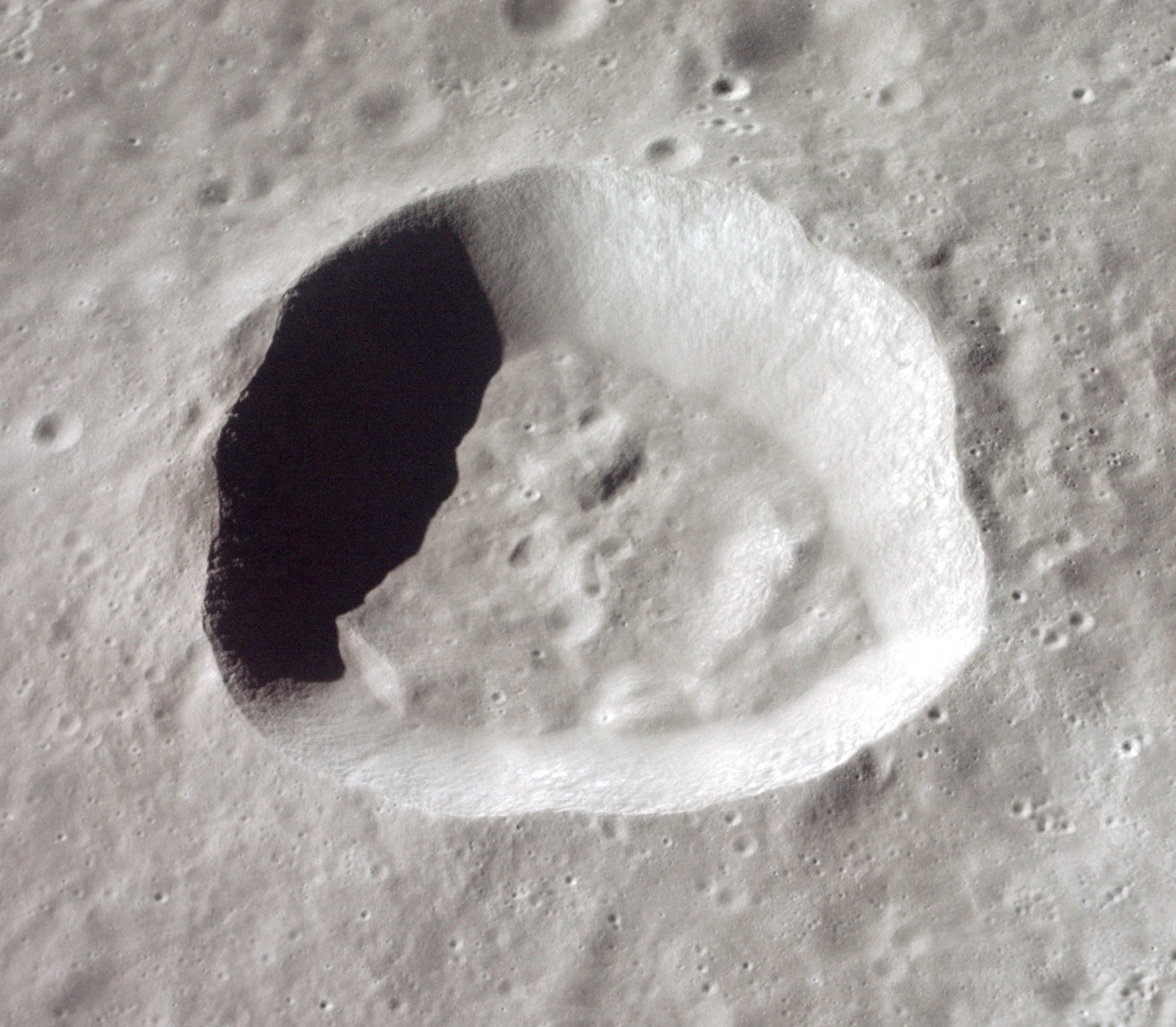
Apollo 12 image of Vesalius M

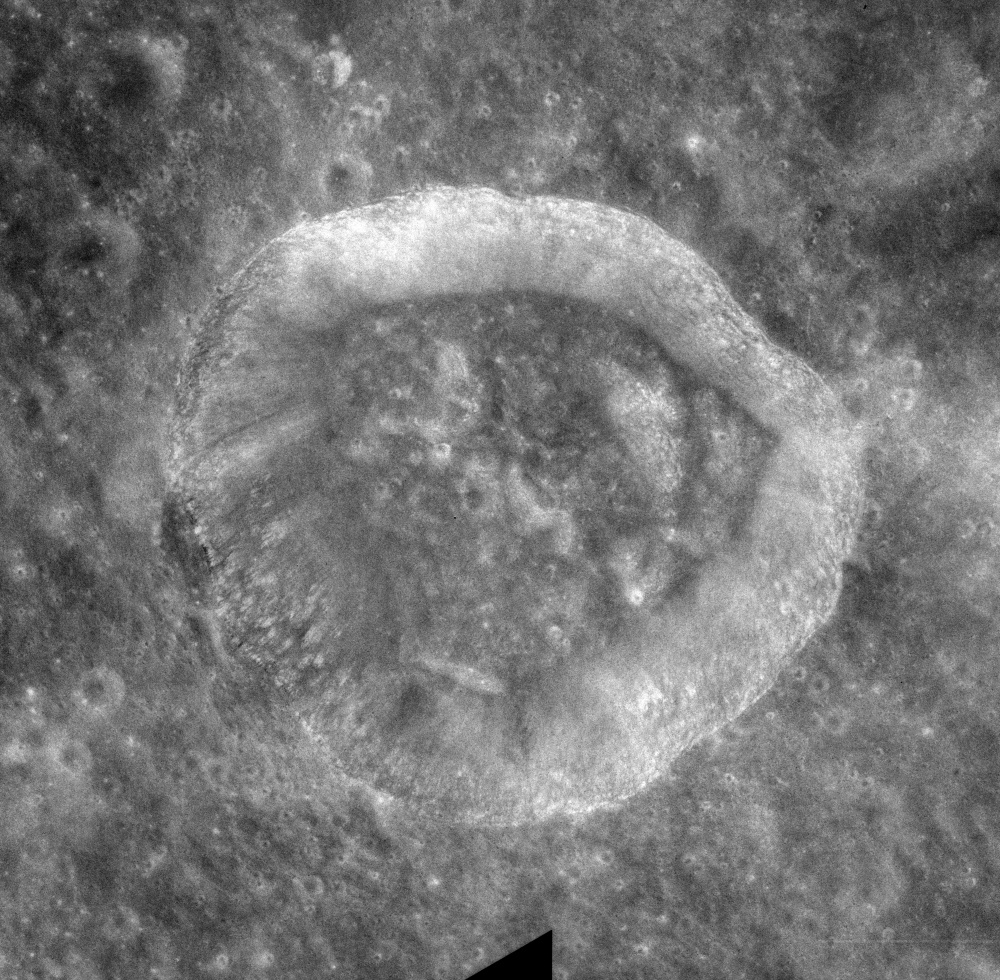
Apollo 17 Mapping camera image of Vesalius M
