= Buisson (crater) =

Lunar impact crater

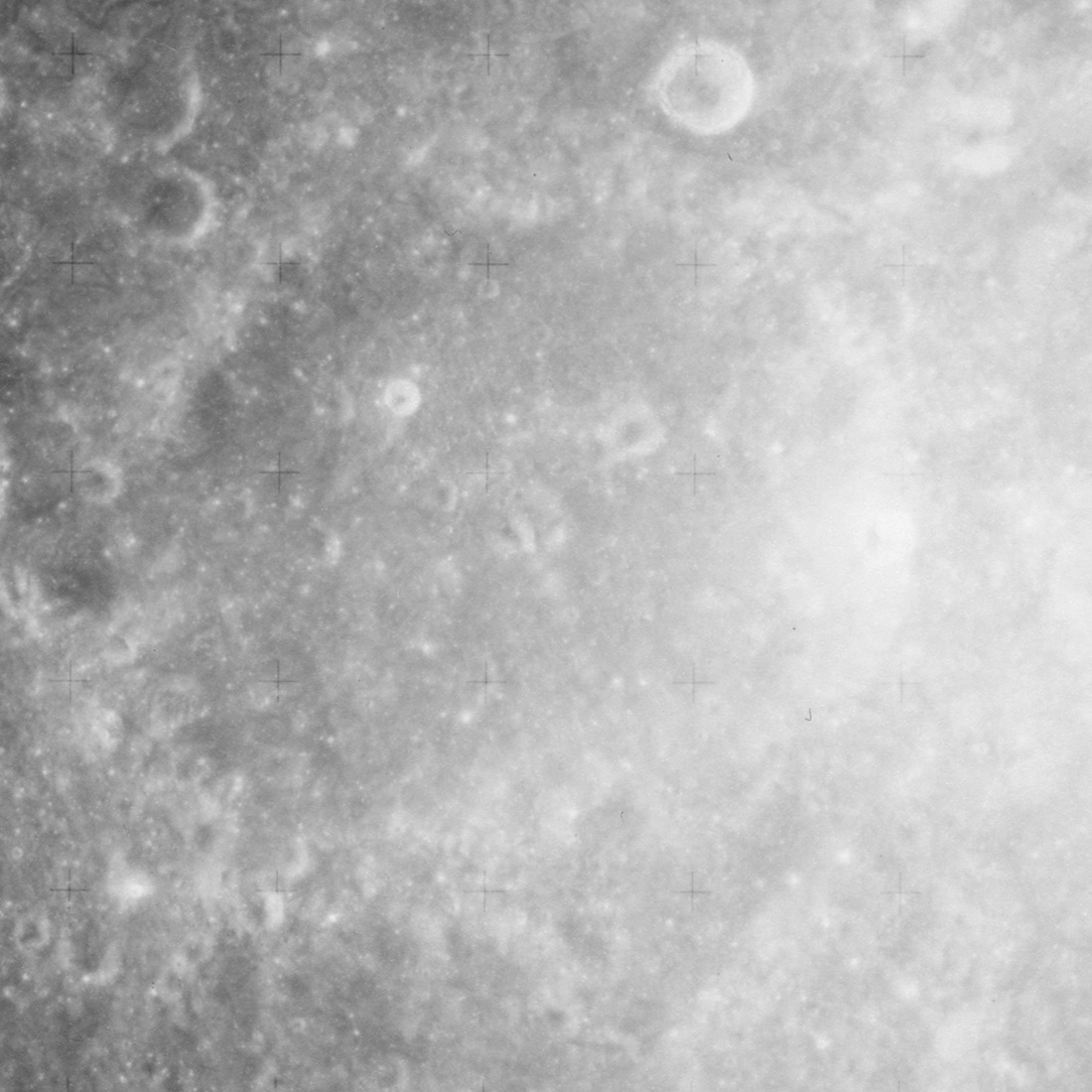
- Apollo 17 Mapping camera image
- Coordinates: 1.4°S 112.5°E
- Diameter: 61.27 km (38.07 mi)
- Colongitude: 248° at sunrise
- Eponym: Henri Buisson

Buisson is a lunar impact crater that is located on the far side of the Moon, just to the south of the equator. Nearly attached to the southeast rim is the crater Vesalius. To the southwest is Einthoven.

The rim of Buisson is circular and somewhat worn. It is lowest in the northern half where it overlays the southern rim of the larger satellite crater Buisson Z. The rim bulges outward to the west, perhaps the result of an overlapping impact. There is a low central ridge across the midpoint of the floor.

This crater is named after the French physicist Henri Buisson (1873–1944). Its designation was officially adopted by the International Astronomical Union in 1970.

== Satellite craters ==
By convention these features are identified on lunar maps by placing the letter on the side of the crater midpoint that is closest to Buisson.

Buisson	Latitude	Longitude	Diameter
V	0.6° S	110.8° E	22 km
X	1.6° N	111.6° E	21 km
Y	1.4° N	112.6° E	36 km
Z	0.0° S	112.5° E	98 km

== Gallery ==
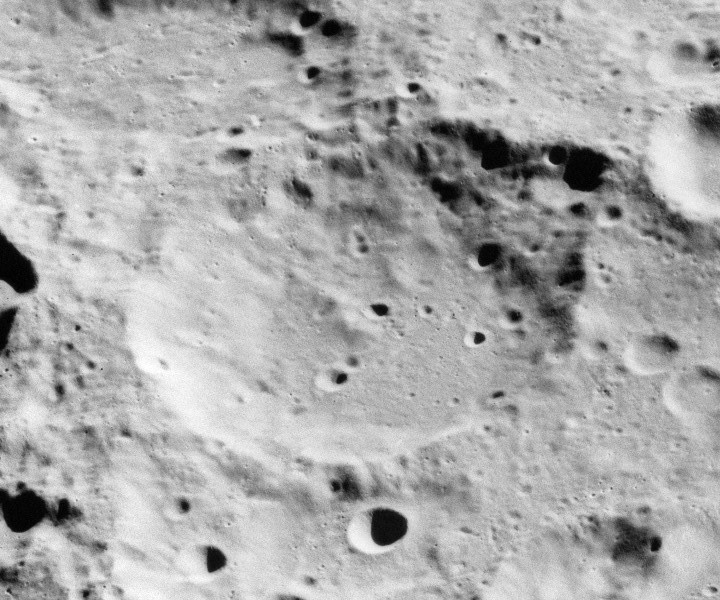
Oblique view from Apollo 16

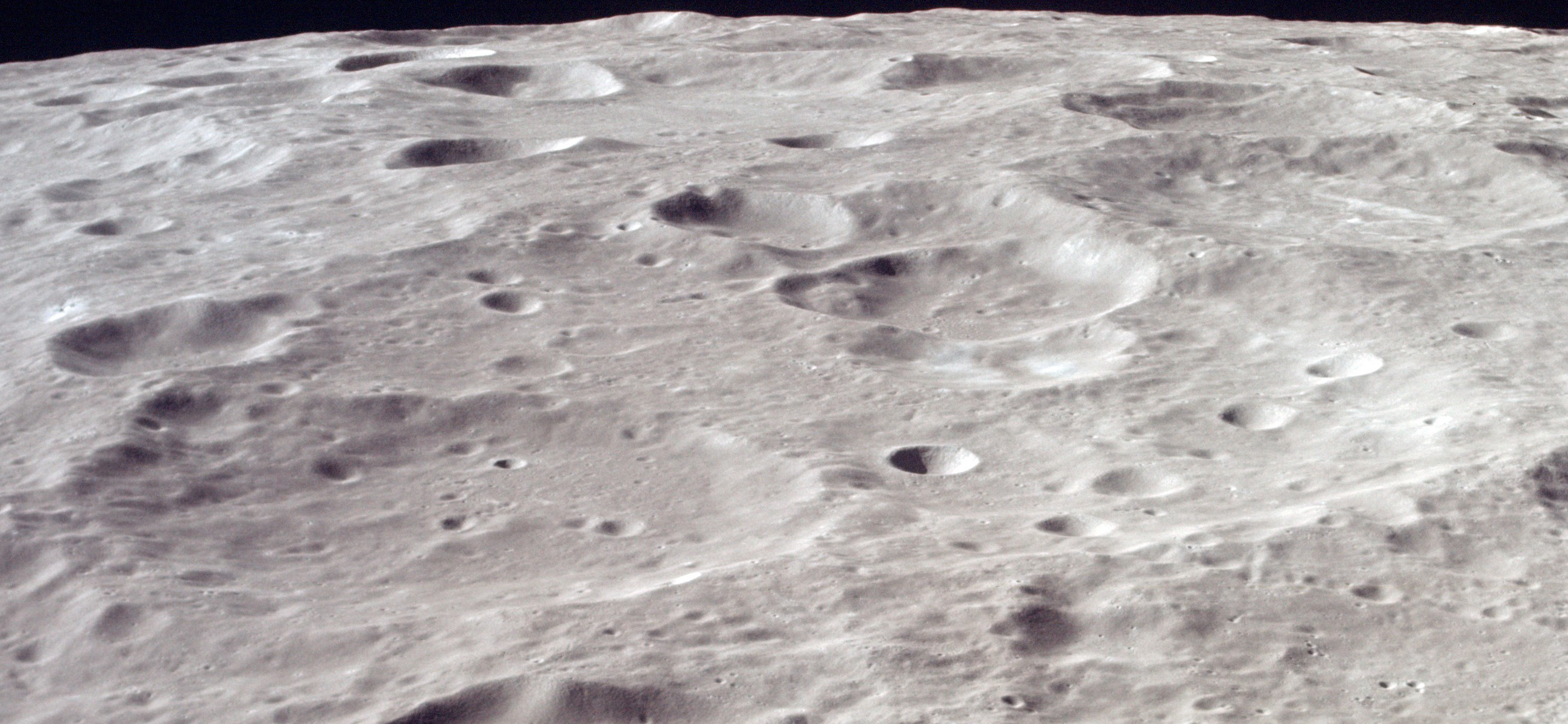
Oblique view from Apollo 12. Buisson is in lower left.

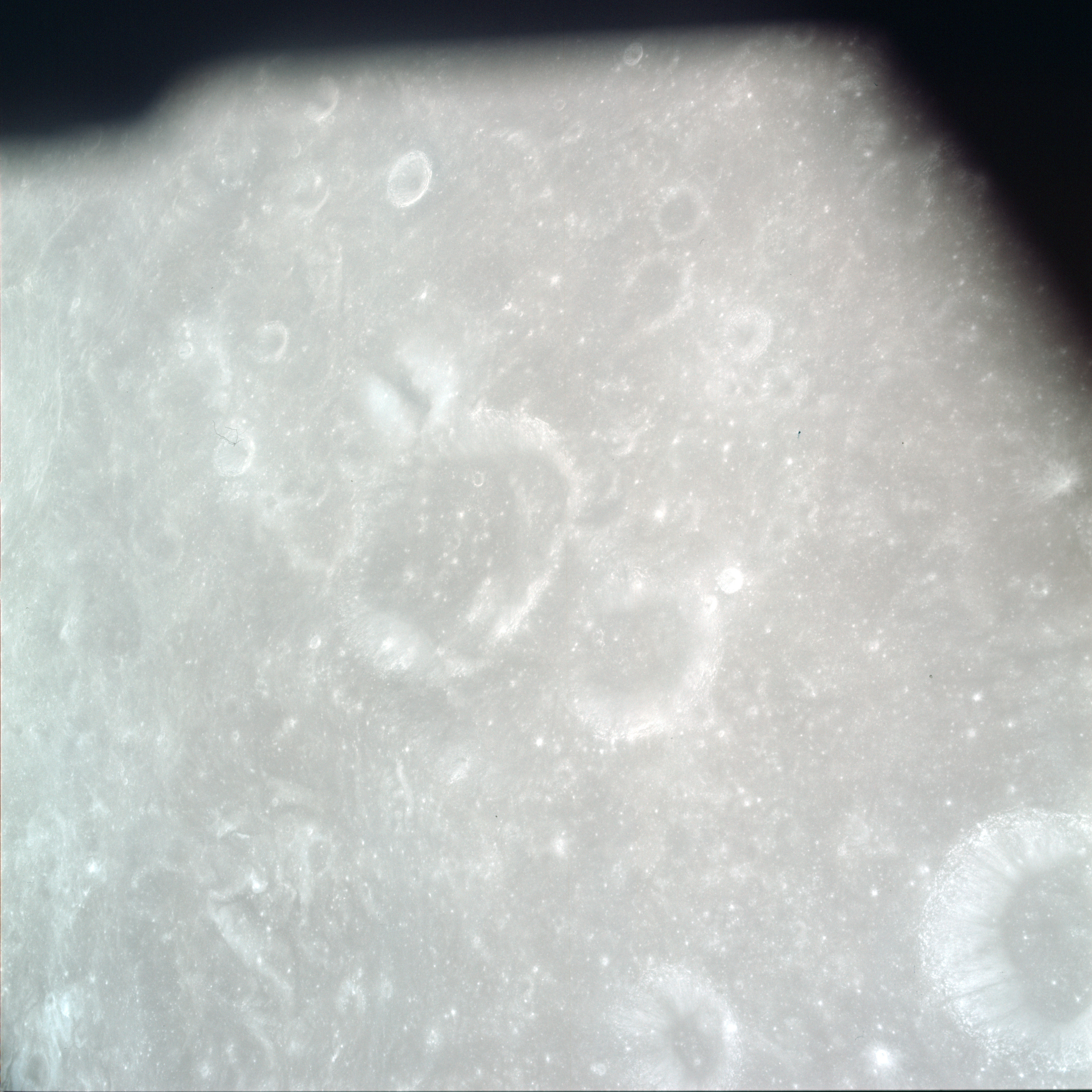
Buisson X and Y craters at a high sun angle showing albedo differences and the presence of small lunar swirls
