= Urval =

- Commune
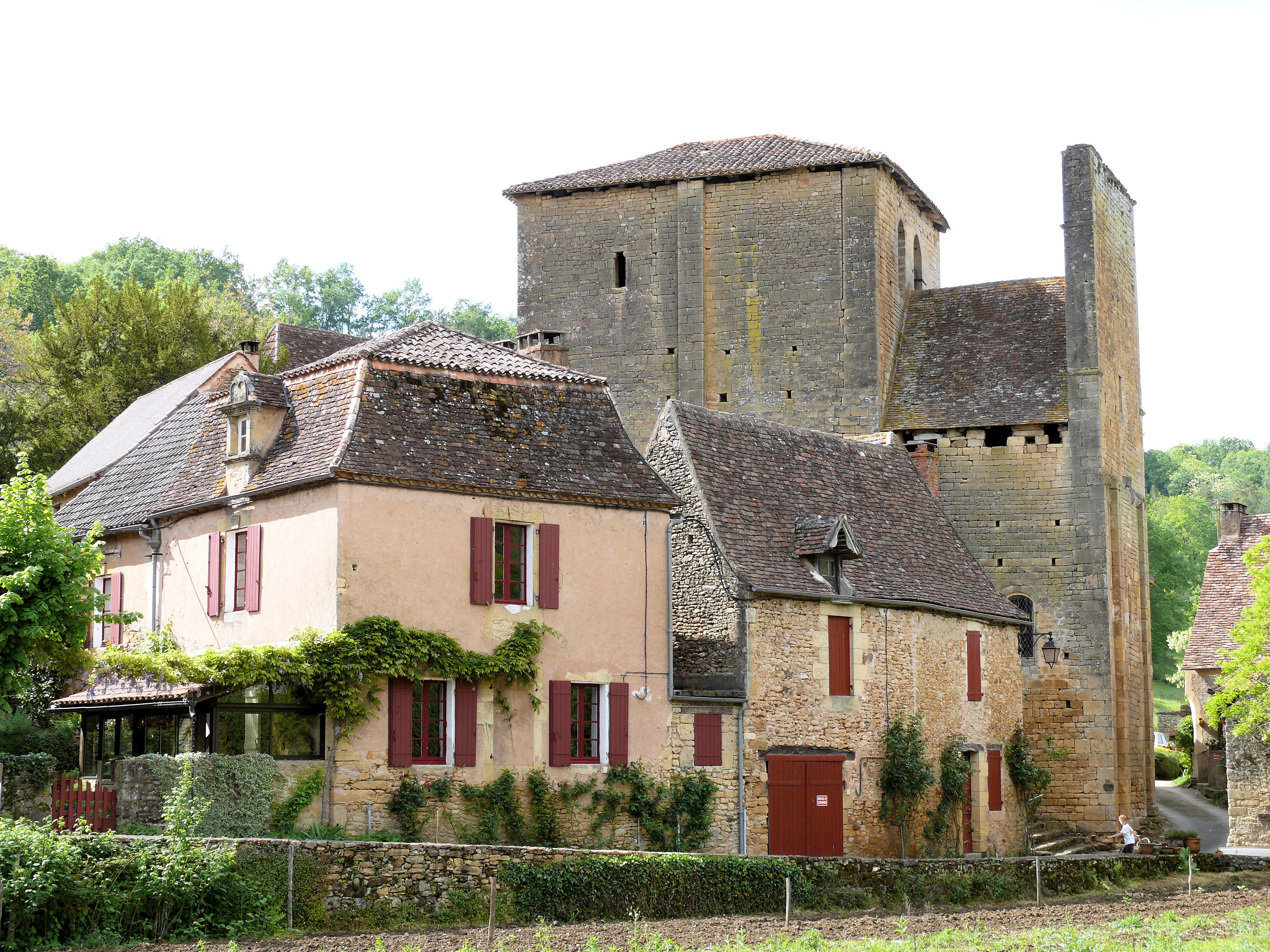
- The church in Urval

- Coat of arms
- Location of Urval
- Location within France Location within Nouvelle-Aquitaine
- Coordinates: 44°48′46″N 0°56′56″E
- Country: France
- Region: Nouvelle-Aquitaine
- Department: Dordogne
- Arrondissement: Bergerac
- Canton: Lalinde
- Intercommunality: Bastides Dordogne-Périgord

Government
  - Mayor (2020–2026): Éloi Compoint
- Area^{1}: 13.38 km^{2} (5.17 sq mi)
- Elevation: 64 m (210 ft)
- Highest elevation: 245 m (804 ft)
- Lowest elevation: 55 m (180 ft)
- Population (2023): 116
  - Density: 8.67/km^{2} (22.5/sq mi)
- Time zone: UTC+01:00 (CET)
  - Summer (DST): UTC+02:00 (CEST)
- INSEE/Postal code: 24560 /24480
- ^{1} French Land Register data, which excludes lakes, ponds, glaciers > 1 km^{2} (0.386 sq mi or 247 acres) and river estuaries.

Urval (French pronunciation: [yʁval]) is a commune in the Dordogne department in Nouvelle-Aquitaine in southwestern France. It is situated near the left bank of the river Dordogne, southeast of Le Buisson-de-Cadouin. It was part of the commune of Le Buisson-de-Cadouin between 1974 and 1989.

== Sights ==
- Château de la Bourlie, with French formal garden

== Population ==
Historical population
Year	Pop.	±% p.a.
1968	159	—
1975	109	−5.25%
1982	121	+1.50%
1990	123	+0.21%
1999	163	+3.18%
2007	152	−0.87%
2012	126	−3.68%
2017	114	−1.98%
2023	116	+0.29%
Source: INSEE

== See also ==
- Communes of the Dordogne department
