= Robert du Mesnil du Buisson =

French soldier & archaeologist (1895-1986)

Count Robert du Mesnil du Buisson (9 April 1895, Champobert, Bourges – 8 April 1986, Caen) was a French historian, soldier, and archeologist. He was noted for his early use of geophysical survey for archaeology. He was the son of Auguste, comte du Mesnil du Buisson and Berthe Roussel de Courcy, and married Jeanne Leclerc de Pulligny (1898-1964) on 26 June 1923. He was the nephew of the geologist Geoffroy d'Ault du Mesnil. He named one of his daughters Ita after the Sphinx found at Ita (in Qatna).

== Soldier ==
Mesnil du Buisson volunteered in 1914, before the call-up, and was lieutenant in the 6th Regiment of chasseurs à cheval. He was awarded the chevalier de la Légion d'Honneur for his bravery.

He volunteered again in 1939, as commander of a squadron of the cavalerie de réserve, fighting in Belgium and France in 1940 then joining the resistance in Normandy. He was elevated to commandeur de la Légion d'Honneur and commandeur de l'ordre des Arts et des Lettres. His other medals included the croix de guerre 1914-1918 and 1939–1945, croix du combattant volontaire, with battle honors for Verdun, Syria and the Resistance.

== Archeologist ==
He was director of excavations at Qatna (el-Mishrifeh: 1924, 1927–29), Til-Barsip (Tell el-Ahmar: 1927, 1929–31) and Hadatu (Arslan Tash, 1928). He was also vice-director of the excavations at Dura-Europos from 1932 to 1937 coordinated between Yale University led by Clark Hopkins and the French Académie des inscriptions et belles-lettres.

During 1932-1933, Count Robert du Mesnil du Buisson had conducted excavations in various locations in Syria and served as a captain in the French army. He participated in the expedition of Dura-Europos acting as a representative of the French Academy. He also conducted research and explored various facets of ancient archaeology in the Lebanese city of Beirut, including the city's defenses and topography.

He discovered the Synagogue of Dura Europos and published on the synagogue's frescos in 1939. Among his other archeological finds were the Baalshamin and the Arslan Tash amulets. He also published accounts of the Temple of Onias and the Camp of Hyksos which he had come across while excavating Tell el-Yahudiya.

In 1947, he had used a metal detector to predict and map what excavations would unearth in Senlis.

== Conservation work ==
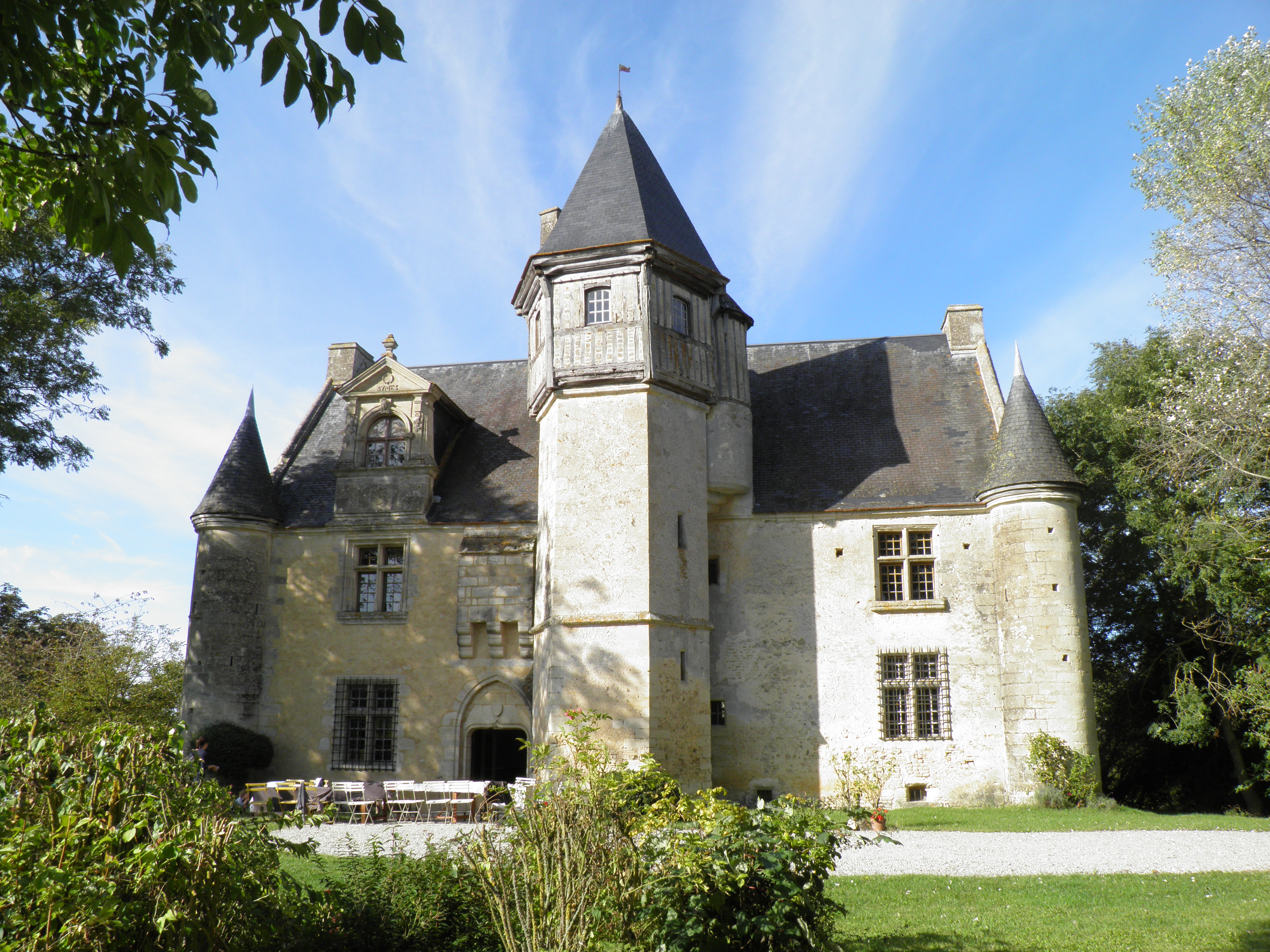
Le manoir d'Argentelles at Villebadin

From 1969 he became actively involved in work to preserve the Le manoir d'Argentelles at Villebadin. He died of injuries sustained in a car accident in 1986.

== Publications ==
- La Technique des fouilles archéologiques. Les principes généraux, Paris, 1934
- La Basilique chrétienne du quartier Karm el-Arabis à Homs, Beirut, 1930
- Le Site archéologique de Mishrifé-Qatna, Paris, 1935
- Les Noms et signes égyptiens désignant des vases ou objets similaire, Paris, 1936
- Les peintures de la Synagogue de Doura-Europos, 245-246 après J.-C., Rome, 1939
- Le sautoir d'Atargatis et la chaîne d'amulettes 1947
- Le Manoir d'Argentelles: Sauvetage d'une œuvre d'art en péril, éd. Gallier, 1969
- Etudes sur les dieux phéniciens hérités par l'Empire romain 1970
- Nouvelles études sur les dieux et les mythes de Canaan 1973
