= Jardin de Planbuisson =

Botanical garden in France

Coordinates: 44°50′46″N 0°54′37″E

The Jardin de Planbuisson (1.5 hectares), also known as Bambous de Planbuisson, is a private botanical garden specializing in grasses and bamboo, located on Rue Montaigne, Le Buisson-de-Cadouin, Dordogne, Aquitaine, France. It is open daily in the warmer months and weekend afternoons year round; an admission fee is charged.

The garden was begun by Michel Bonfils in 1989 near the confluence of the rivers Dordogne and Vézère. It contains some 430 Poaceae species, described as the most extensive collection of grasses in Europe, as well as 264 species and cultivars of bamboo. It also includes a dry Zen garden and a commercial nursery.

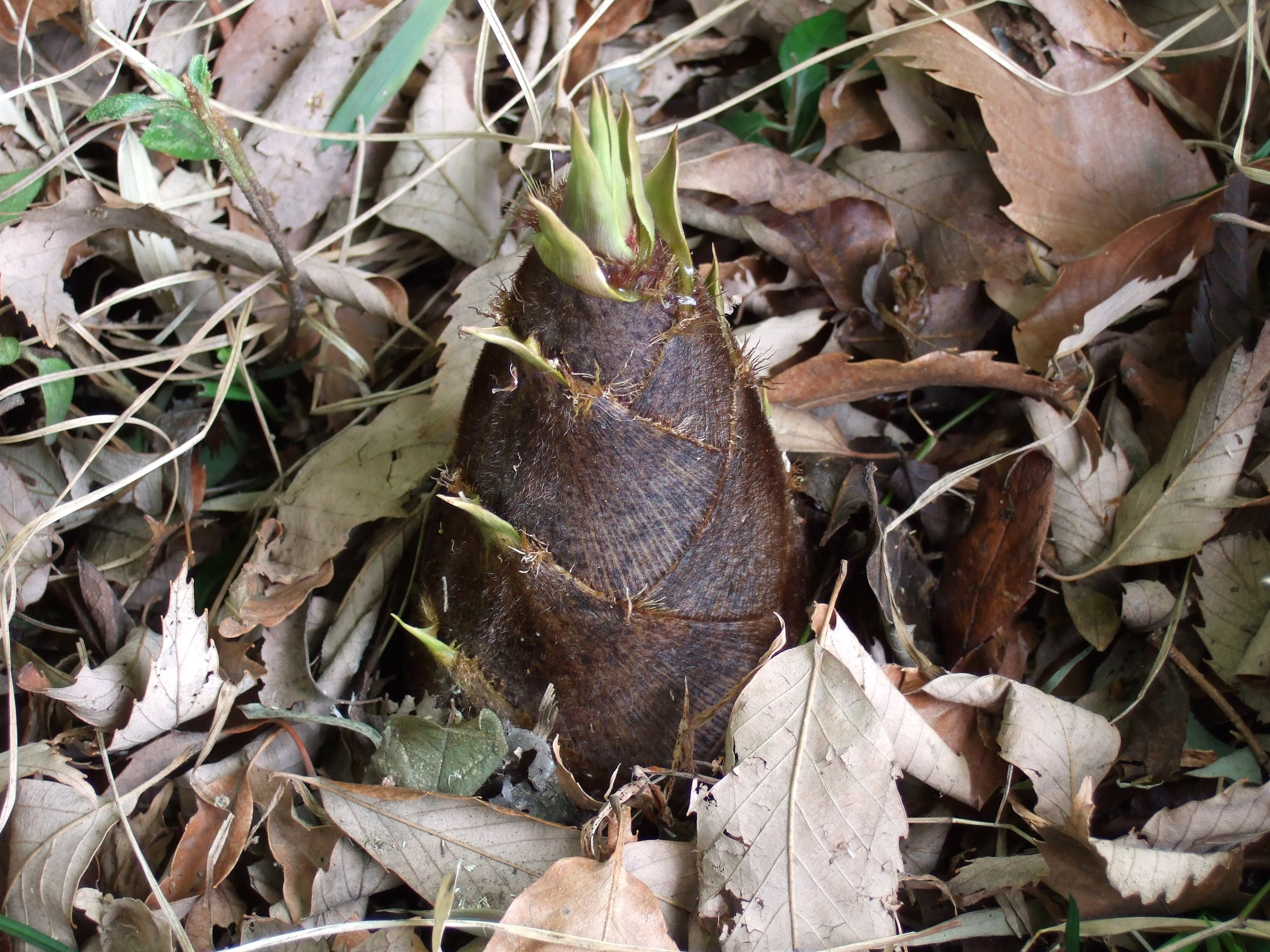
Jardin de Planbuisson

== See also ==
- List of botanical gardens in France
