= Molières, Dordogne =

Molières
- Commune
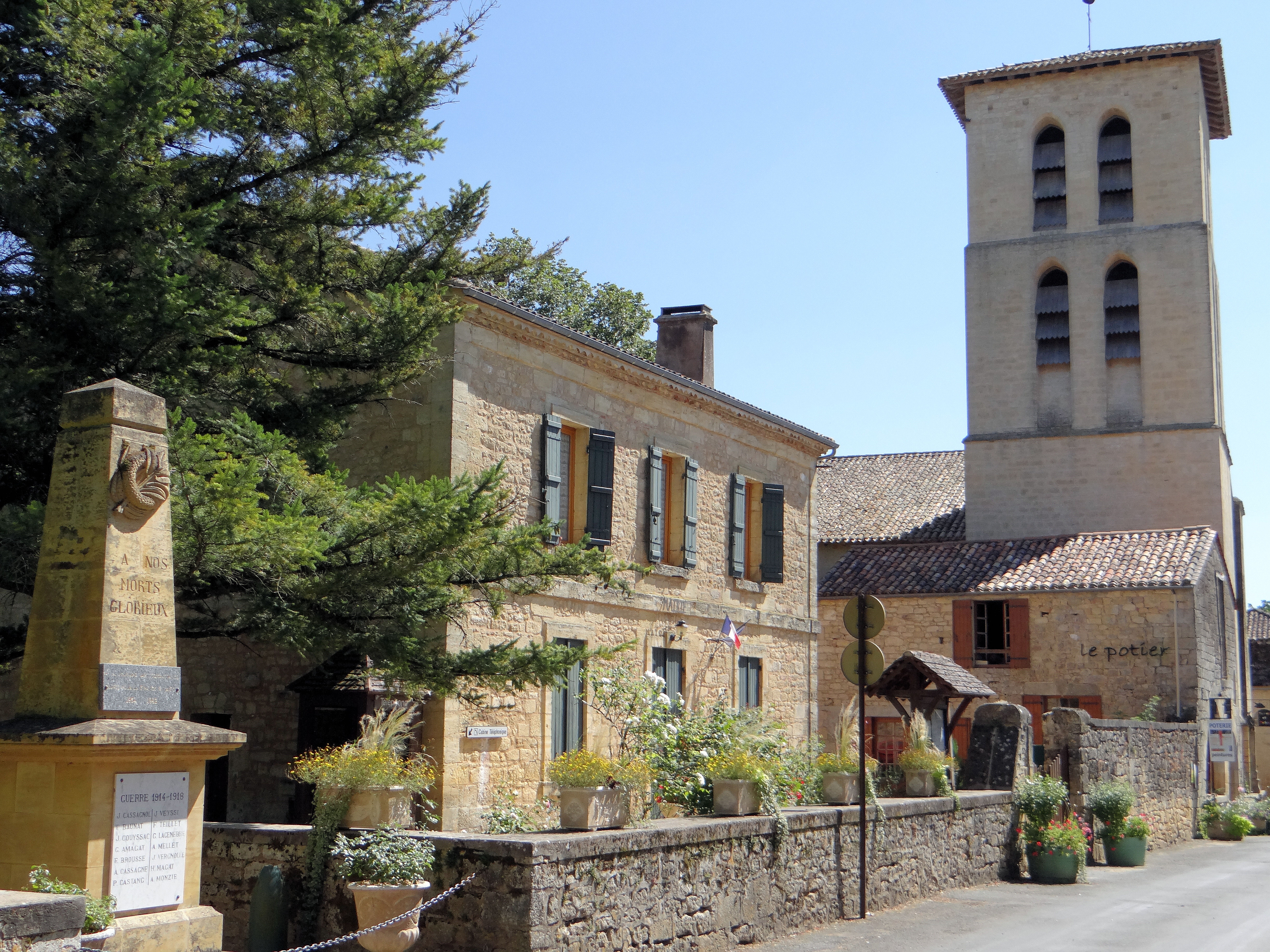
- The town hall and church in Molières

- Coat of arms
- Location of Molières
- Location within France Location within Nouvelle-Aquitaine
- Coordinates: 44°48′41″N 0°49′29″E
- Country: France
- Region: Nouvelle-Aquitaine
- Department: Dordogne
- Arrondissement: Bergerac
- Canton: Lalinde
- Intercommunality: Bastides Dordogne-Périgord

Government
  - Mayor (2020–2026): Alexandre Lacoste
- Area^{1}: 21.22 km^{2} (8.19 sq mi)
- Elevation: 140 m (460 ft)
- Highest elevation: 205 m (673 ft)
- Lowest elevation: 65 m (213 ft)
- Population (2023): 370
  - Density: 17/km^{2} (45/sq mi)
- Time zone: UTC+01:00 (CET)
  - Summer (DST): UTC+02:00 (CEST)
- INSEE/Postal code: 24273 /24480
- ^{1} French Land Register data, which excludes lakes, ponds, glaciers > 1 km^{2} (0.386 sq mi or 247 acres) and river estuaries.

Molières (French pronunciation: [mɔljɛʁ]; Occitan: Molièras) is a commune in the Dordogne department in Nouvelle-Aquitaine in southwestern France.

== Population ==
Historical population
Year	Pop.	±% p.a.
1968	347	—
1975	283	−2.87%
1982	294	+0.55%
1990	315	+0.87%
1999	292	−0.84%
2007	315	+0.95%
2012	323	+0.50%
2017	330	+0.43%
2023	370	+1.93%
Source: INSEE

== See also ==
- Communes of the Dordogne department
