= Château de la Bourlie =

Castle in France

Coordinates: 44.8018°N 0.9501°E

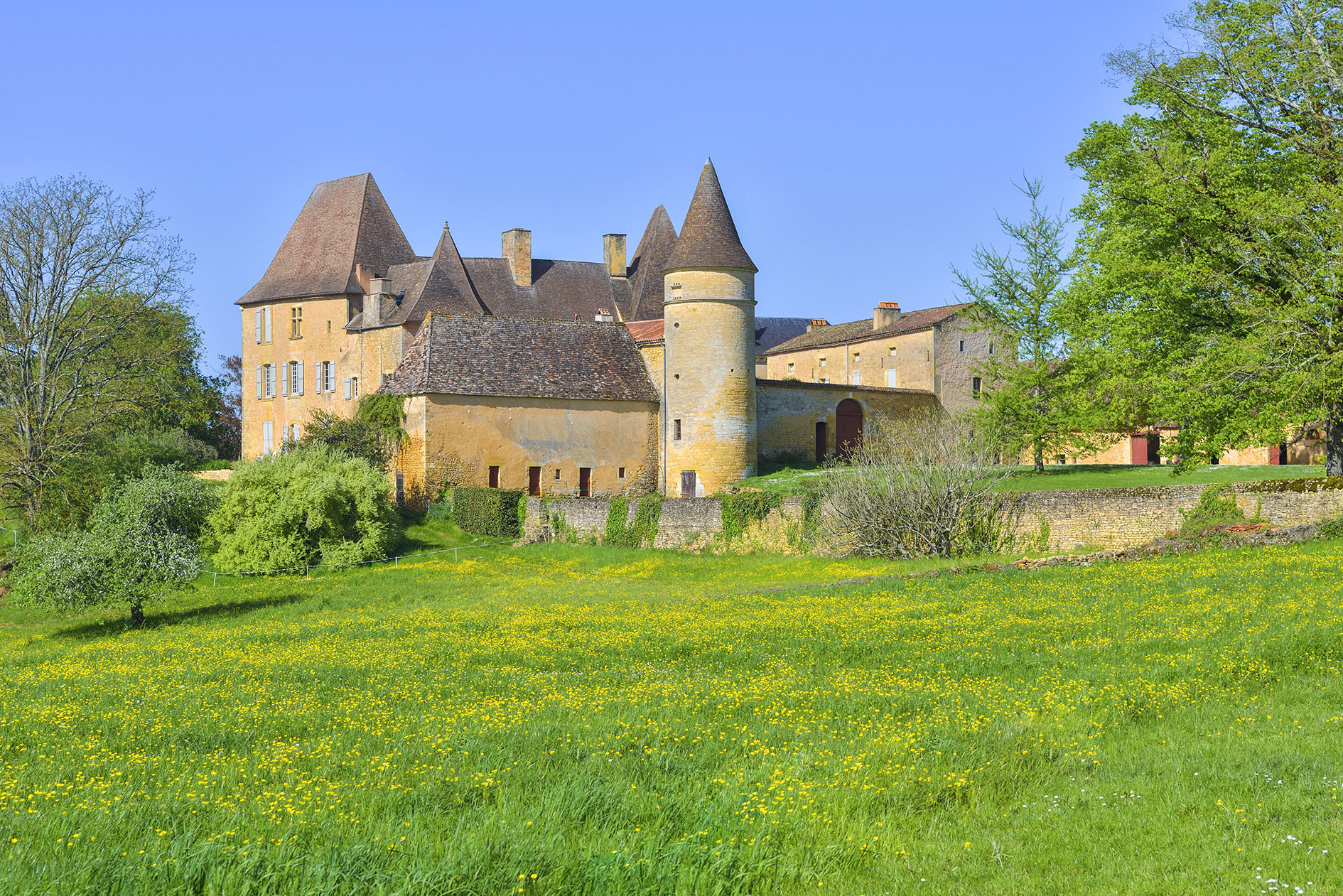
Le chateau de La Bourlie, commune d'Urval, Dordogne, France

The Château de la Bourlie is a castle in Urval 24480, in the Dordogne Department of France. It has a garden à la française, listed by the Committee of Parks and Gardens of the French Ministry of Culture as one of the Notable Gardens of France.

== History ==
The gardens surround the château of a noble family of Périgord, built in the 14th century. The first gardens, created in the 17th century, were kitchen gardens and a walled ornamental garden. Later, in the 18th century, a Garden à la française was created. A grand axis between the village and woods was laid out, an alley linden trees was planted, along with yew trees trimmed into topiary forms. In the nineteenth century an English landscape garden was added. The garden also has many varieties of old roses and fruit trees.
