= Henri Buisson =

French physicist

Henri Buisson (French: [ɑ̃ʁi bɥisɔ̃]; 1873–1944) was a French physicist. Buisson and Charles Fabry discovered the ozone layer in 1913.

Buisson was born on 15 July 1873 in Paris and died on 6 January 1944 in Marseille, at age 70.

The lunar crater Buisson was named after him in 1970.
