= Arslan Tash reliefs =

The Arslan Tash reliefs are bas-reliefs of human figures and animals which adorned the city gates and temple portals of ancient Hadatu; the modern archeological site of Arslan Tash, literally "the Stone Lion". (Turkish; Arslan - Lion, Taş - Stone)

The bas-reliefs may have been carved by different artists in different periods, but an inscription carved across the body of one bull dates the inscription to the reign of Tiglath-Pileser III (745-727 BC) however artistic considerations suggest the conclusion that the reliefs were originally carved sometime between the reigns of Shalmaneser III (858-824 BC) and Sargon II (721-705 BC).

In February 2015, in the Syrian city of Raqqa, the Islamic State of Iraq and the Levant (ISIL) publicly ordered the bulldozing of a colossal ancient Assyrian gateway lion sculpture from the 8th century BC. Another lion statue was also destroyed. Both statues originated from the Arslan Tash archaeological site. The destruction was published in the ISIL magazine, Dabiq.

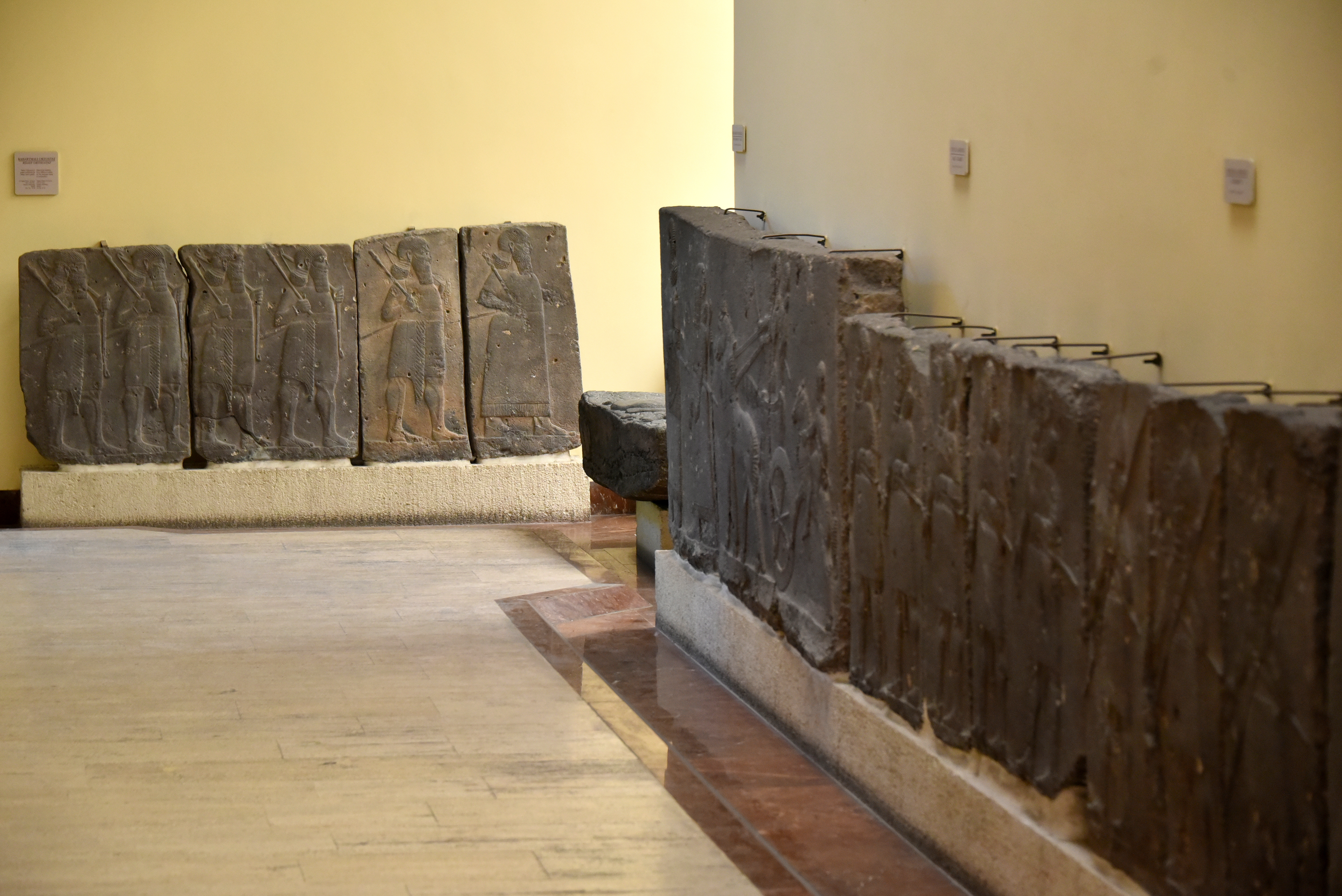
Basalt wall slabs from the palace of Tiglath-pileser III at Arslan Tash, Syria. Ancient Orient Museum, Istanbul

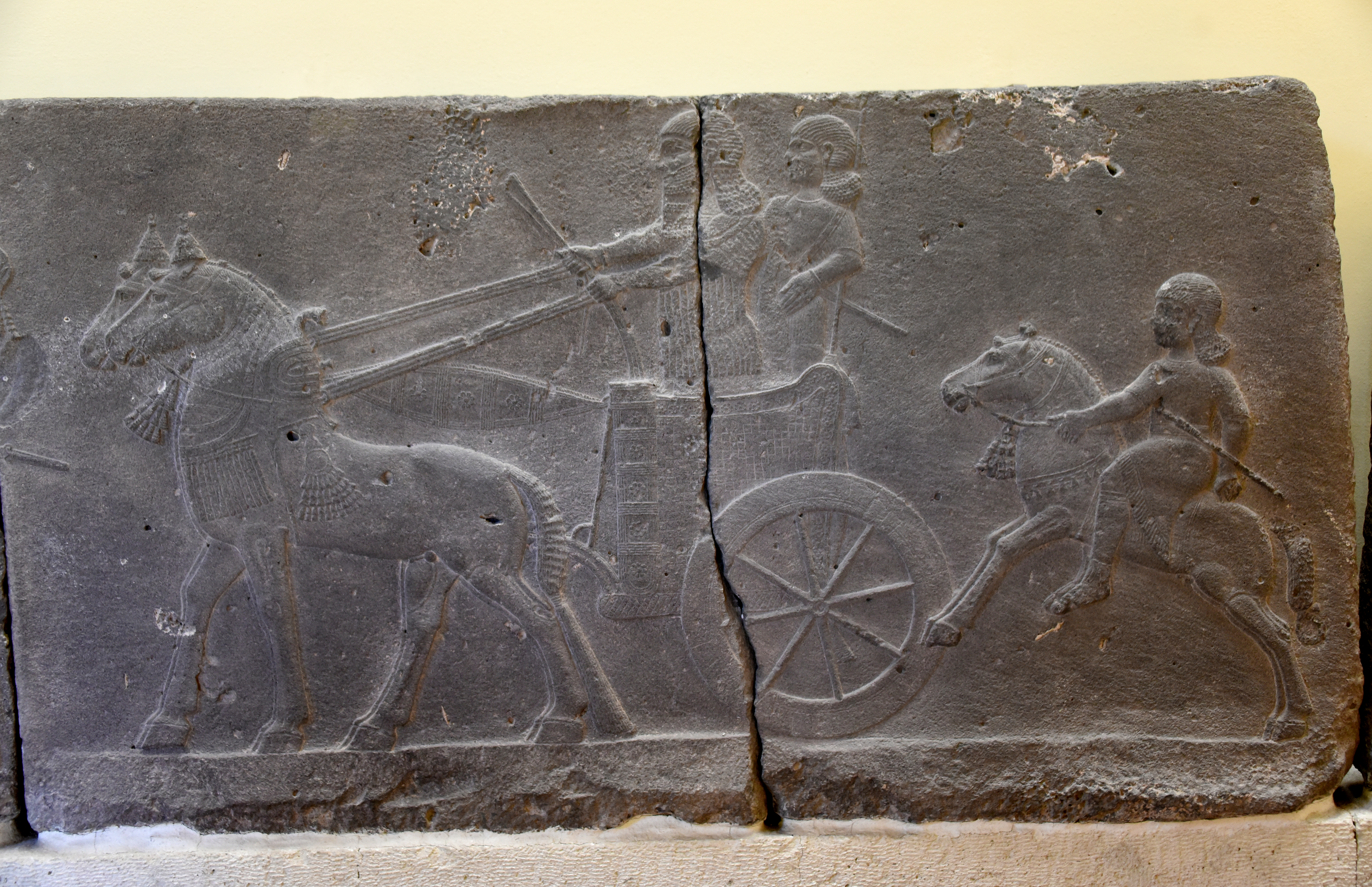
Assyrian chariot, charioteer, and a horse rider. Basalt wall reliefs from the palace of Tiglath-pileser III at Arslan Tash, Syria. 744-727 BCE. Ancient Orient Museum, Istanbul

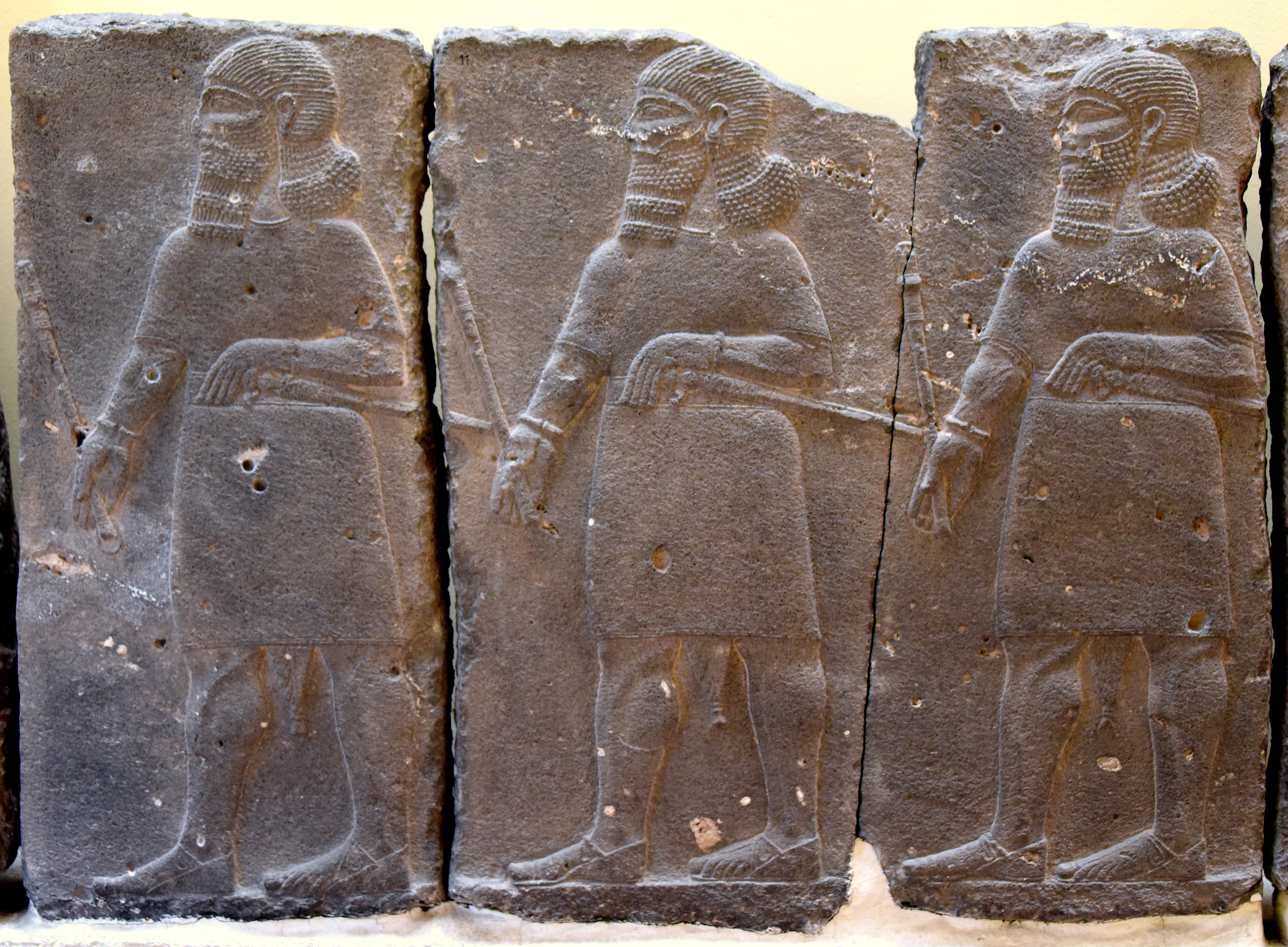
Assyrian warriors. A procession of mace bearers. Basalt wall reliefs from the palace of Tiglath-pileser III at Arslan Tash, Syria. 744-727 BCE. Ancient Orient Museum, Istanbul

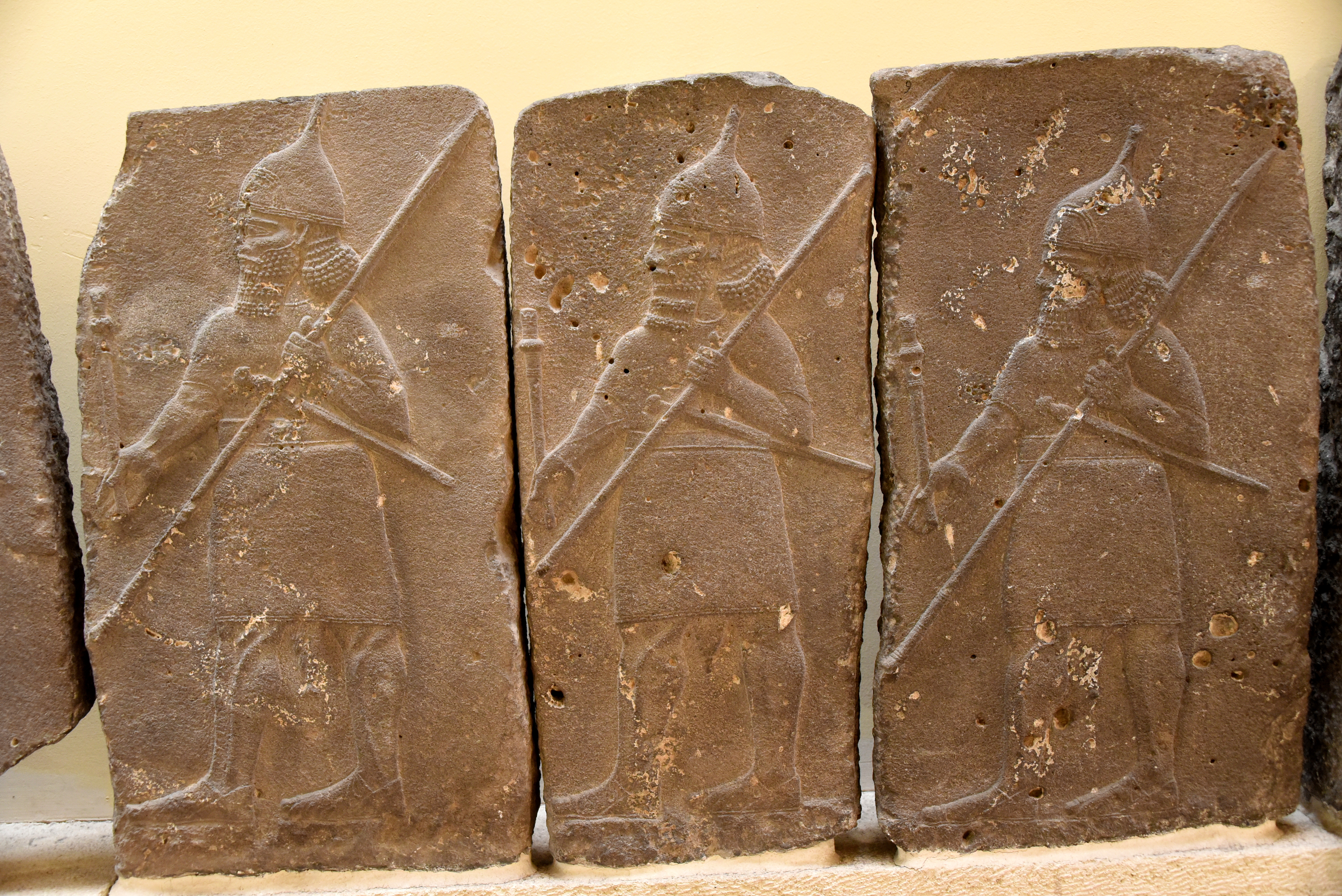
Basalt wall slab showing Assyrian soldiers in procession, holding long spears. From the palace of Tiglath-pileser III at Arslan Tash, Syria. Ancient Orient Museum, Istanbul

== See also ==
- Destruction of cultural heritage by ISIL
