= Alexandre Buisson =

French flying ace (1886–1939)

- Born: 17 September 1886; Hauts-de-Seine, France
- Died: 1939 (aged 52–53)
- Military career
- Allegiance: France
- Branch: Hussars, then flying service
- Rank: Adjutant
- Units: 8th Hussar Regiment, F29, R240
- Awards: Médaille militaire, Croix de Guerre

Alexandre Buisson (17 September 1886 – 1939) was a French World War I flying ace credited with five aerial victories.

== Biography ==
Buisson served as a Hussar before his transfer to aviation. He would serve as an observer/gunner in two seater aircraft. Beginning on 29 August 1918, he scored five confirmed victories before war's end. His fourth and fifth victories on 3 November 1918 coincided with his receipt of the Médaille militaire. He also won the Croix de Guerre.

== Honors and awards ==
Croix de Guerre
Médaille militaire citation:
"Adjudant machine-gunner on an aeroplane. Non-commissioned officer gunner of the highest military spirit, carried out daily delicate protection missions during the course of which he had numerous combats, gaining the admiration of his superiors by his modest courage and remarkable calm, and the precision of his fire. On 3 November 1918, at the end of a protection mission, noticing an enemy convoy, he strafed it as his pilot flew along the enemy lines. Attacked by a patrol of ten planes, he sustained a severe and unequal fight, permitting his pilot to disengage and succeeded in downing two of his adversaries, one in flames and the other crashed to the earth. Three citations, five planes downed."
