= Arslan Tash =

Archaeological site in northern Syria

- Location within Syria
- 36°50′55″N 38°24′28″E
- Location: Syria
- Region: Aleppo Governorate

Arslan Tash (Turkish: Arslan Taş "Lion Stone"), ancient Hadātu, is an archaeological site in Aleppo Governorate in northern Syria, around 30 kilometres (19 mi) east of Carchemish and the Euphrates and near the town of Kobanî.

== History ==
The city was the center of an Aramean Iron Age kingdom, which was conquered by Assyria in the 9th century BC. The site includes a Late Assyrian palace, an early shrine to Ishtar and a Hellenistic temple, surrounded by city walls and gates adorned with lions carved from stone.

== Archaeology ==
Plan of the private apartments in the palace at Arslan Tash

The site of Arslan Tash was first examined in 1836 by an expedition led by Francis Rawdon Chesney. The first actual excavations were conducted by the French archaeologist François Thureau-Dangin for the Louvre Museum in two short seasons during 1928. It worked on the fortifications, a Hellenistic period temple, a temple to Ishtar, the "Bâtiment aux ivoires" and late Assyrian remains.

In 2007 and 2008 work at the site resumed when surveys were conducted by a team from University of Bologna and Directorate-General of Antiquities and Museums of the Syrian Arab Republic. The team was led by Anas al-Khabour and Serena Maria Cecchini. Each season lasted about a week, with the later one including geophysical work.

=== Gateway reliefs ===
The Arslan Tash reliefs are bas-reliefs of people and animals on the gates of the city and temple. The dating of the reliefs is uncertain, though one contains an inscription of Tiglath-Pileser III of the Neo-Assyrian Empire

In February 2015, in the Syrian city of Raqqa, the Islamic State of Iraq and the Levant (ISIL) publicly ordered the bulldozing of a colossal ancient Assyrian gateway lion sculpture from the 8th century BC. Another lion statue was also destroyed. Both statues originated from the Arslan Tash archaeological site. The destruction was published in the ISIL magazine, Dabiq.

=== Ivory items ===
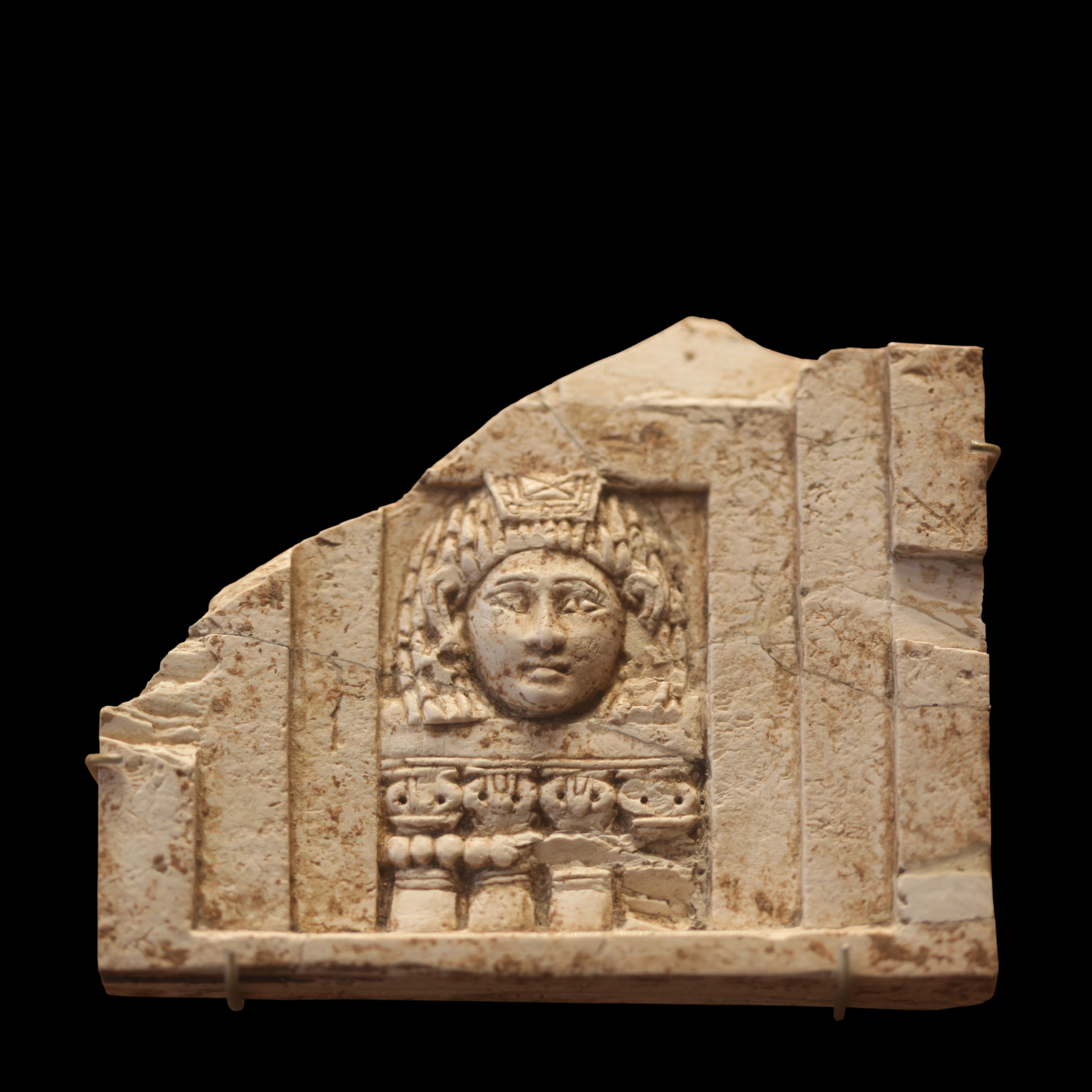

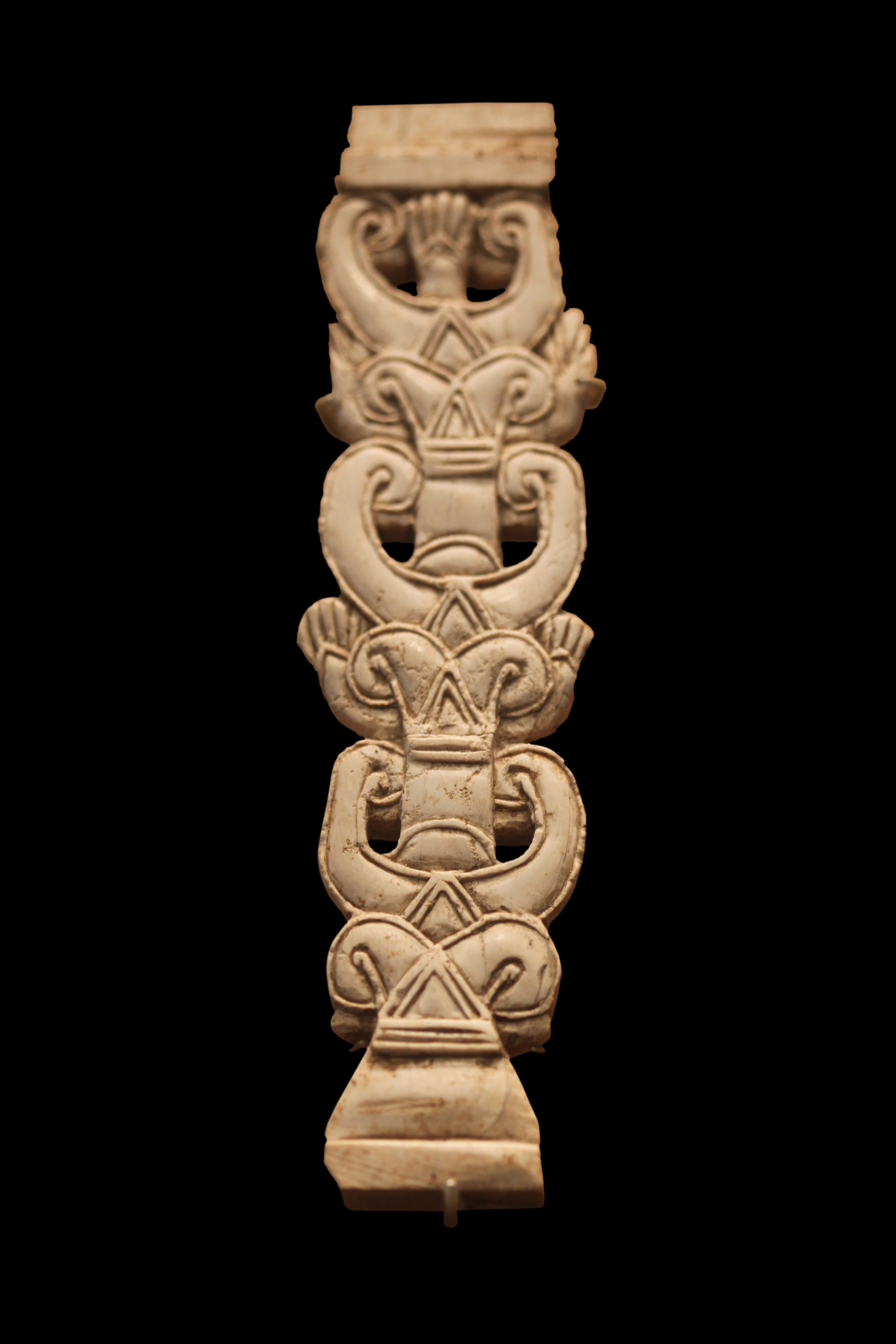

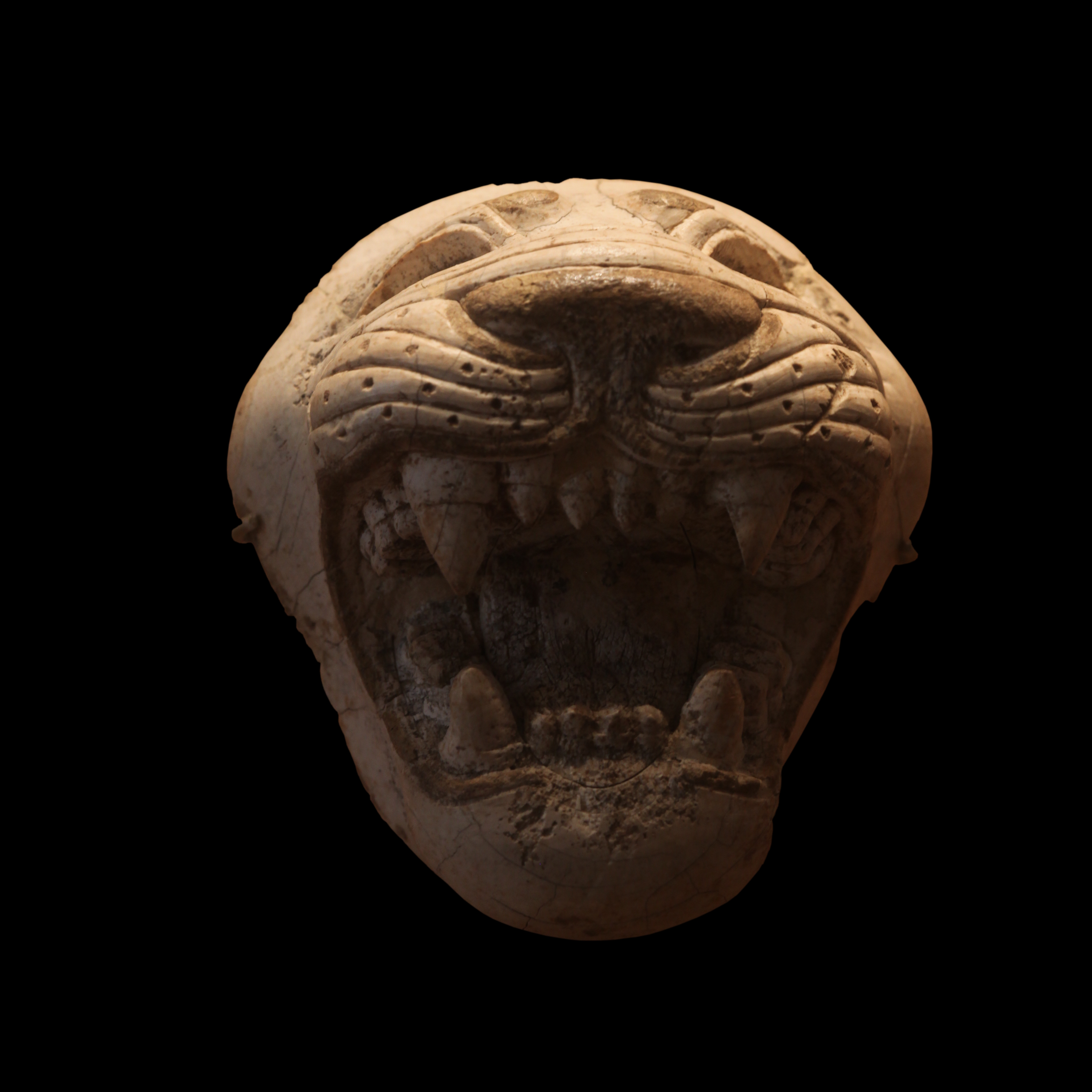

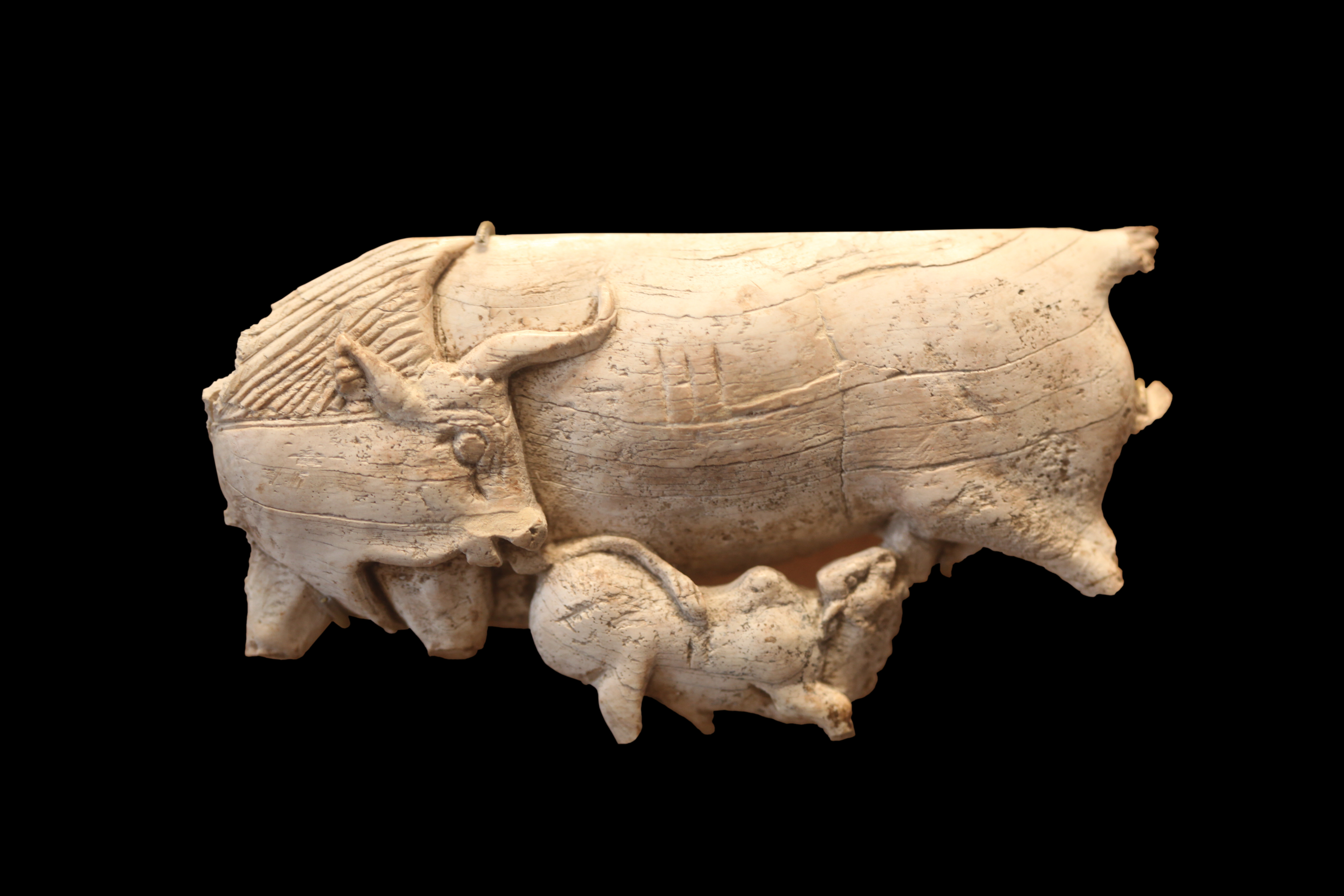
The woman at the window, tree of life, lion, and suckling bovine are common goddess symbols. The latter is Egyptian hieroglyph ams.

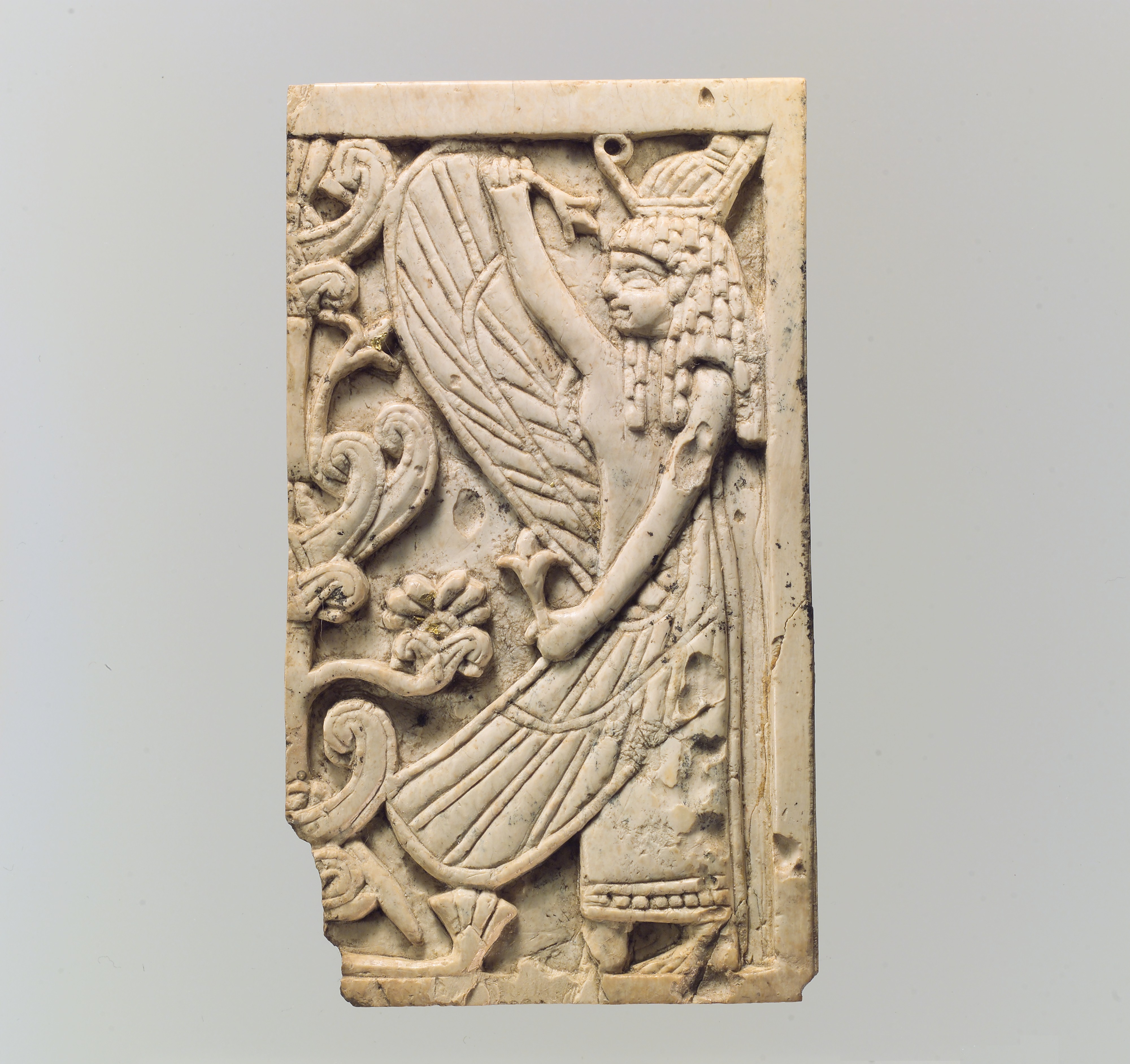
Ivory plaque carved with a winged female figure, and a "sacred tree"; Assyrian, ca. 9th–8th century B.C.; 3.13 x 1.83 in. (7.95 x 4.65 cm) Metropolitan Museum of Art

The most important discoveries from Arslan Tash were, however, the ivory objects of high artistic quality which today are kept at the Archaeological Museum in Aleppo and in the Louvre.

Among them is the Arslan Tash ivory inscription that carries the name 'Hazael'; this was part of a bed that may have belonged to the Biblical king Hazael of Aram-Damascus. The inscription is known as KAI 232. See also Hazael horse frontlet.

=== Amulets ===
The Arslan Tash amulets are two limestone pieces. They were not excavated, rather purchased from an antiquities dealer, so their actual provenance is uncertain. The writing on the tablets is in Aramaic script, although the language of the inscriptions is Phoenician. The tablets were subject to extensive research over the decades, and they have provided remarkable insights into the society and religion of that period. Some scholars questioned the authenticity of these amulets.

== Gallery ==
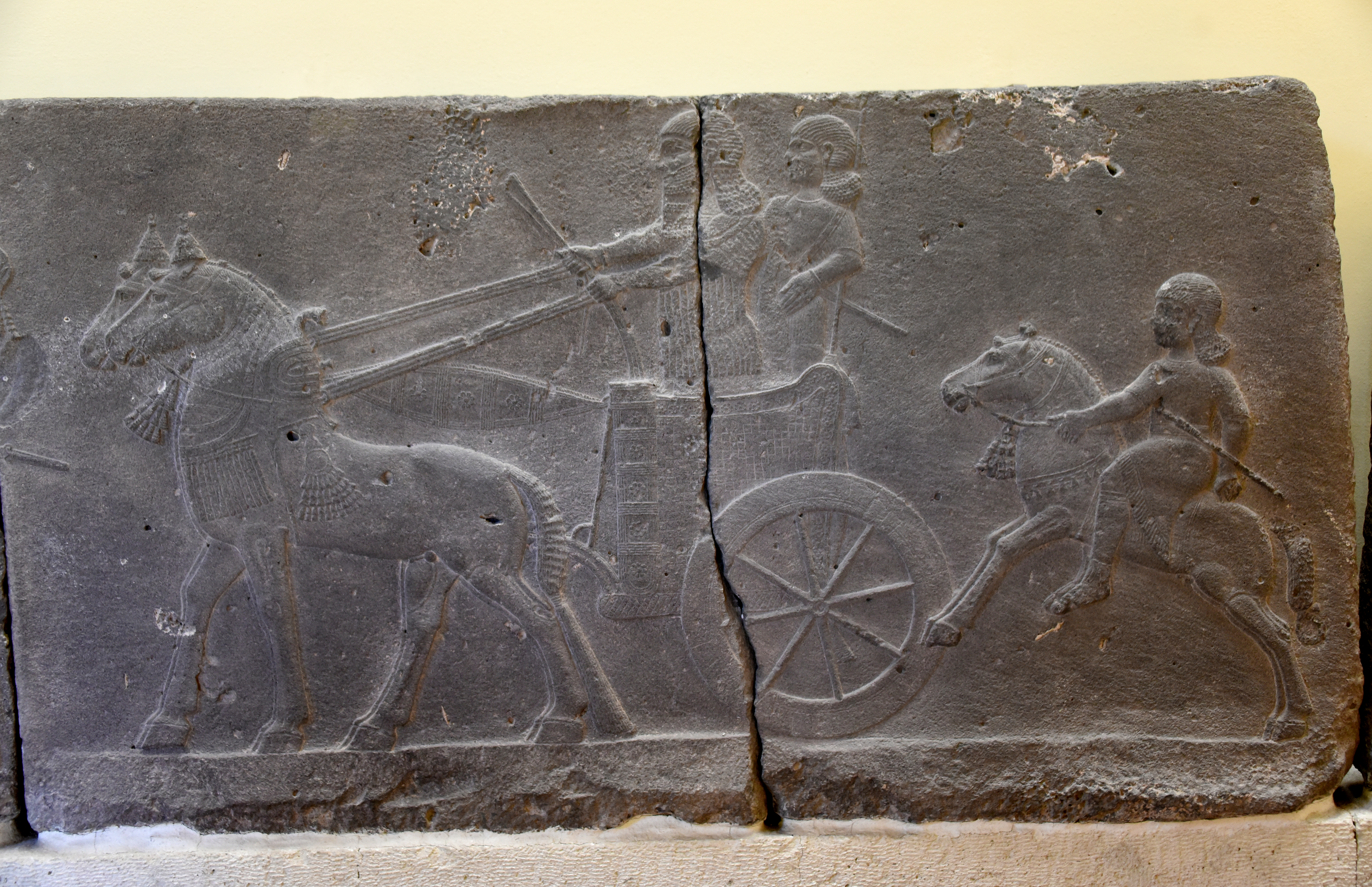
Assyrian chariot, charioteer, and a horse rider. Basalt wall relief. From the palace of Tiglath-pileser III at Hadatu, Syria. 744-727 BCE. Ancient Orient Museum, Istanbul

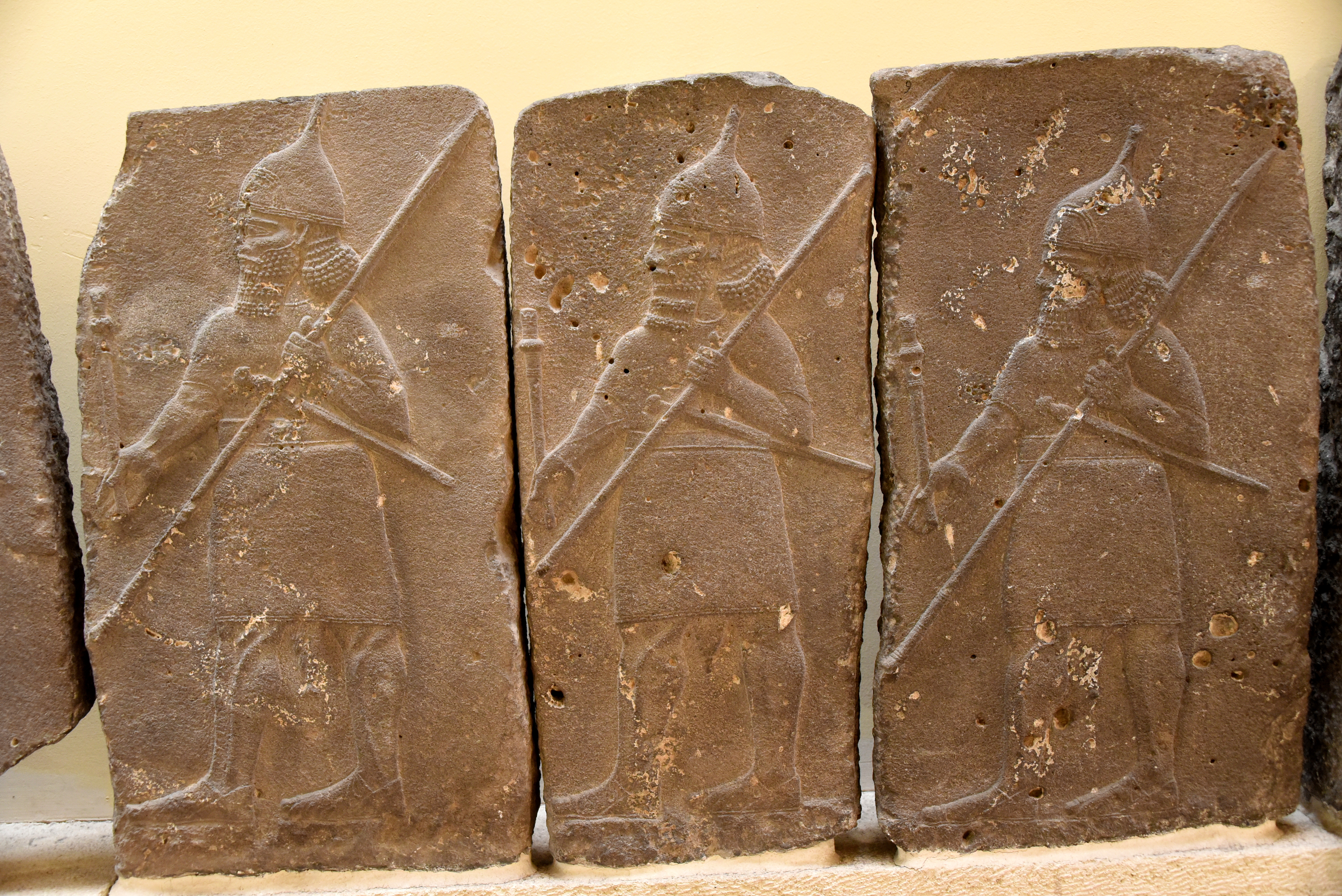
Basalt wall slab showing Assyrian soldiers in procession, holding long spears. From the palace of Tiglath-pileser III at Hadatu, Syria. Ancient Orient Museum, Istanbul

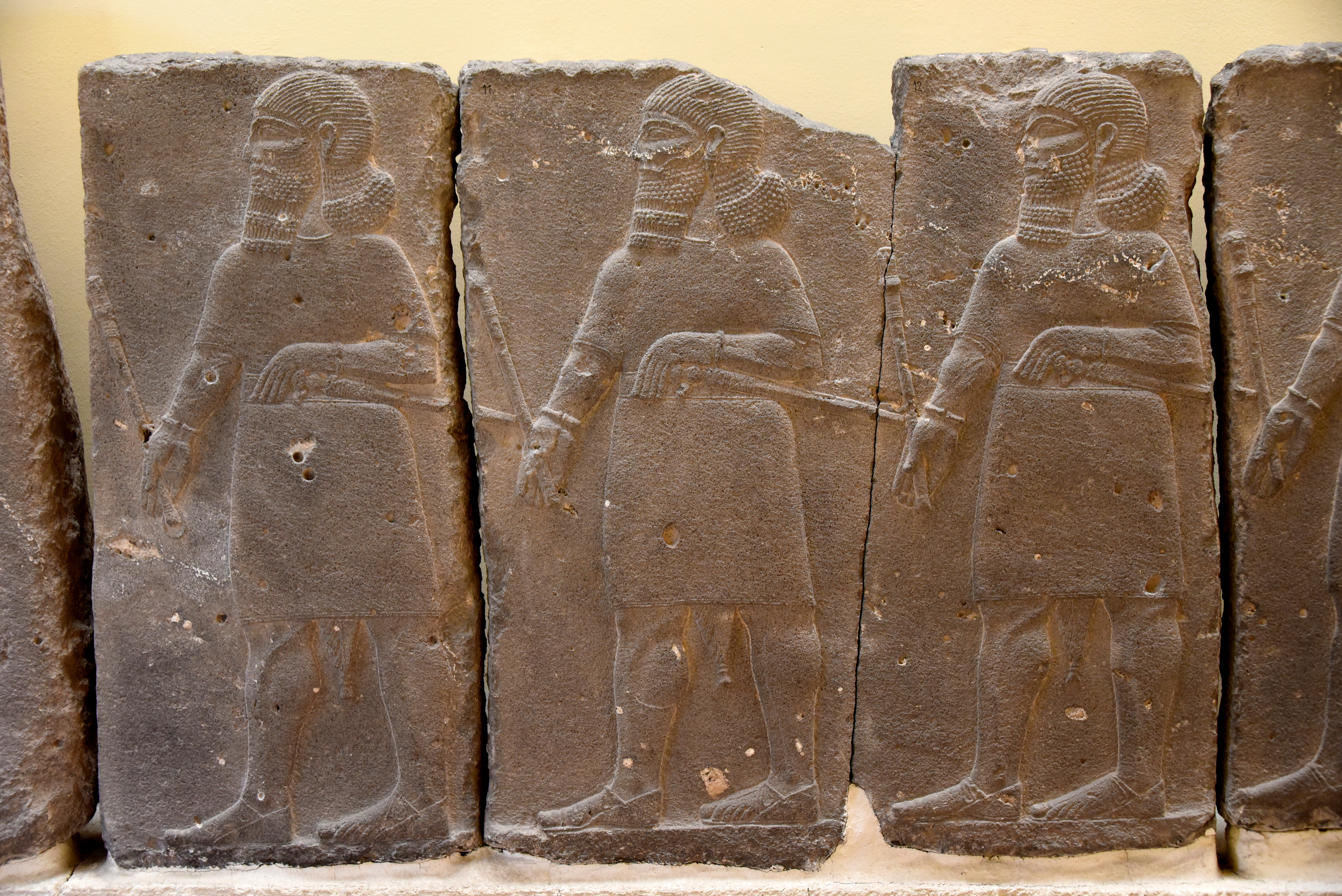
Basalt wall slab showing three Assyrian soldiers in procession. From the palace of Tiglath-pileser III at Hadatu, Syria. Ancient Orient Museum, Istanbul

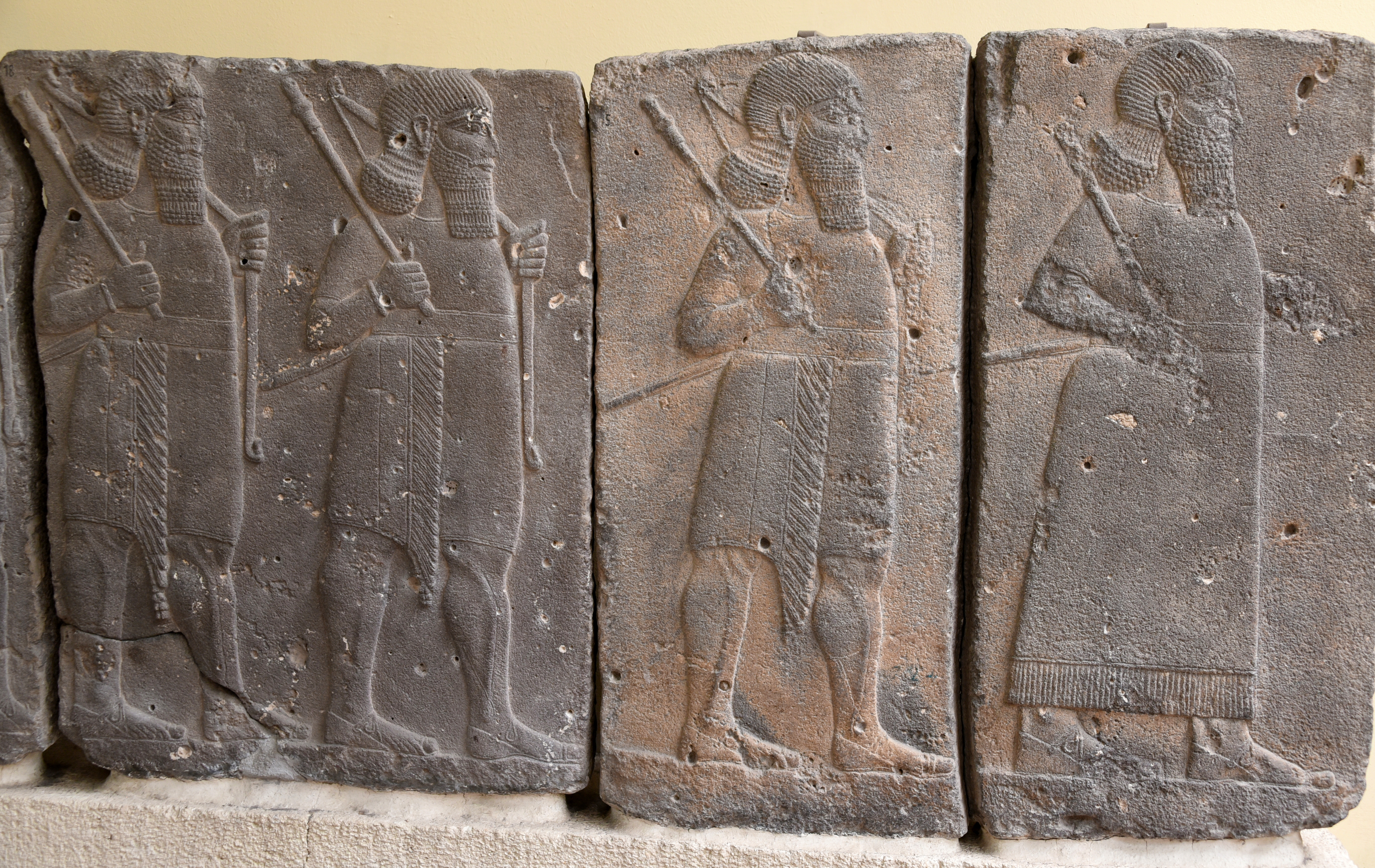
Basalt wall slab showing Assyrian soldiers in procession, holding maces and bows. From the palace of Tiglath-pileser III at Hadatu, Syria. Ancient Orient Museum, Istanbul

== See also ==
- Cities of the ancient Near East
- Destruction of cultural heritage by ISIL
- Short chronology timeline
- Arslan Tash amulets
