= Badefols-sur-Dordogne =

- Commune
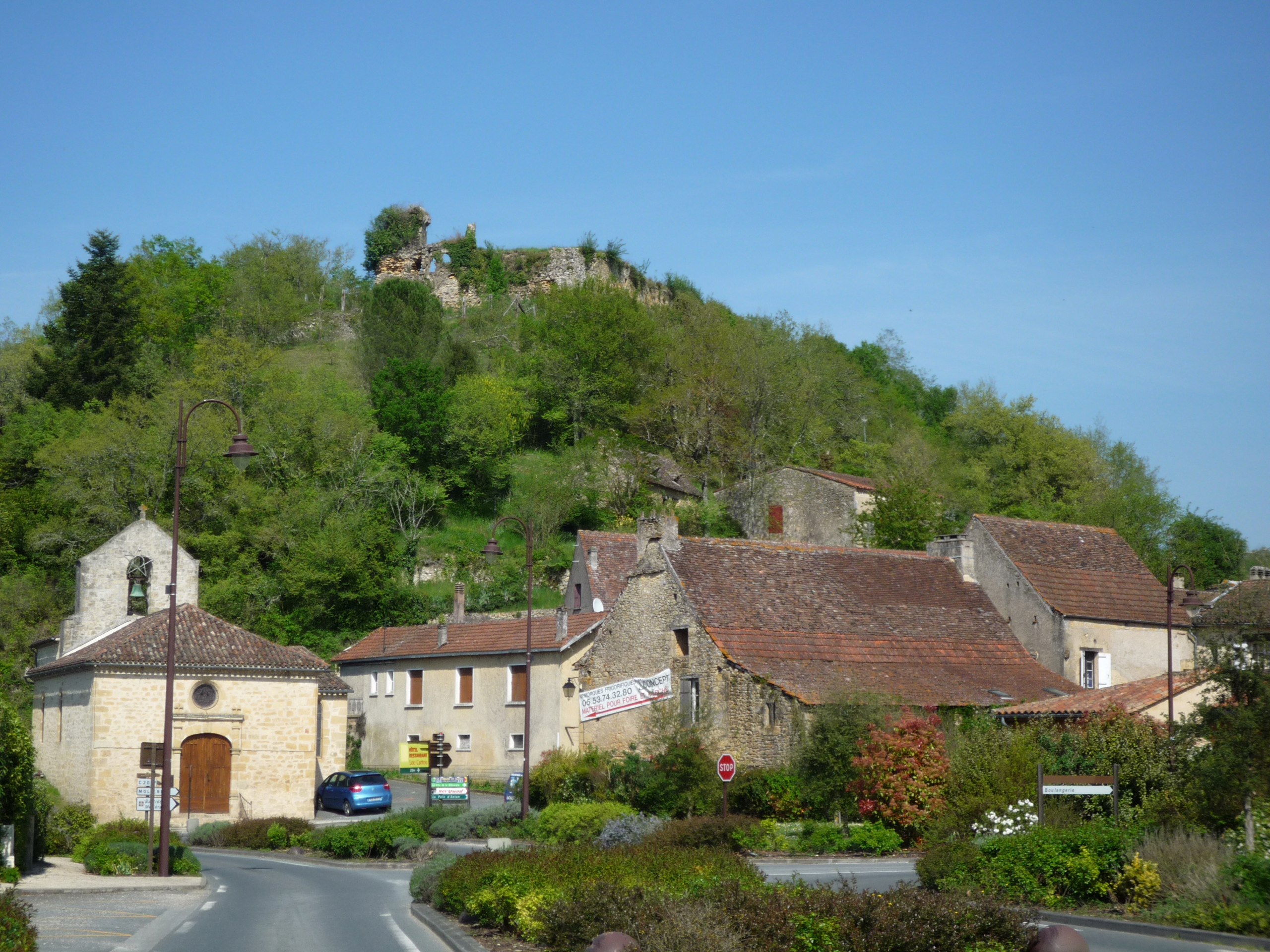
- A general view of Badefols-sur-Dordogne

- Coat of arms
- Location of Badefols-sur-Dordogne
- Location within France Location within Nouvelle-Aquitaine
- Coordinates: 44°50′39″N 0°47′32″E
- Country: France
- Region: Nouvelle-Aquitaine
- Department: Dordogne
- Arrondissement: Bergerac
- Canton: Lalinde
- Intercommunality: Bastides Dordogne-Périgord

Government
  - Mayor (2020–2026): Martin Slaghuis
- Area^{1}: 6.06 km^{2} (2.34 sq mi)
- Elevation: 46 m (151 ft)
- Highest elevation: 180 m (590 ft)
- Lowest elevation: 35 m (115 ft)
- Population (2023): 202
  - Density: 33.3/km^{2} (86.3/sq mi)
- Time zone: UTC+01:00 (CET)
  - Summer (DST): UTC+02:00 (CEST)
- INSEE/Postal code: 24022 /24150
- ^{1} French Land Register data, which excludes lakes, ponds, glaciers > 1 km^{2} (0.386 sq mi or 247 acres) and river estuaries.

Badefols-sur-Dordogne (French pronunciation: [badfɔl syʁ dɔʁdɔɲ], literally Badefols on Dordogne; Occitan: Badafòl de Dordonha) is a commune in the Dordogne department in southwestern France. The commune is situated on the river Dordogne.

== Name ==
As its name suggests, the town is set on the edge of the Dordogne, on the left bank, downstream from the dam Mauzac. The name of the town is of Occitan origin, but its explanation is uncertain. It could come from badar (gawk) and mad (crazy), or bada foolish (bystander), whose nicknames were dressed the villageois The second part of the name naturally refers to the Dordogne, on the left bank of which stood the Village.

== History ==
In Gallo-Roman times, a port was established on the Dordogne. The construction of the Castle of Badefols is before century the 10th century. The first known written records of the town date back to the 13th century in the forms Badafol and Badefol1.

The town was named in 1864 Badefols.

In 1952 it changes official name, abandons Badefols-de-Cadouin to become Badefols-sur-Dordogne.

By 1790 the town of Badefols-sur-Dordogne is attached to the canton of Cadouin which depends on the district of Belvès until 1795, the date of abolition of the districts. In 1801, the canton is attached to the arrondissement of Bergerac. In 1952, the commune of Badefols-de-Cadouin was renamed Badefols-sur-Dordogne.

It changed its name in 1974, becoming the canton of Le Buisson-de-Cadouin.

As part of the 2014 reform defined by the decree of 21 February 2014, the canton disappears in the departmental elections in March 2015. The town is then attached to the canton of Lalinde.

The commune is part of the Communauté de communes des Bastides Dordogne-Périgord.

== Population ==
Historical population
Year	Pop.	±% p.a.
1968	173	—
1975	143	−2.68%
1982	150	+0.69%
1990	188	+2.86%
1999	187	−0.06%
2007	200	+0.84%
2012	223	+2.20%
2017	212	−1.01%
2023	202	−0.80%
Source: INSEE

== See also ==
- Communes of the Dordogne department
