= Le Buisson-de-Cadouin =

- Commune
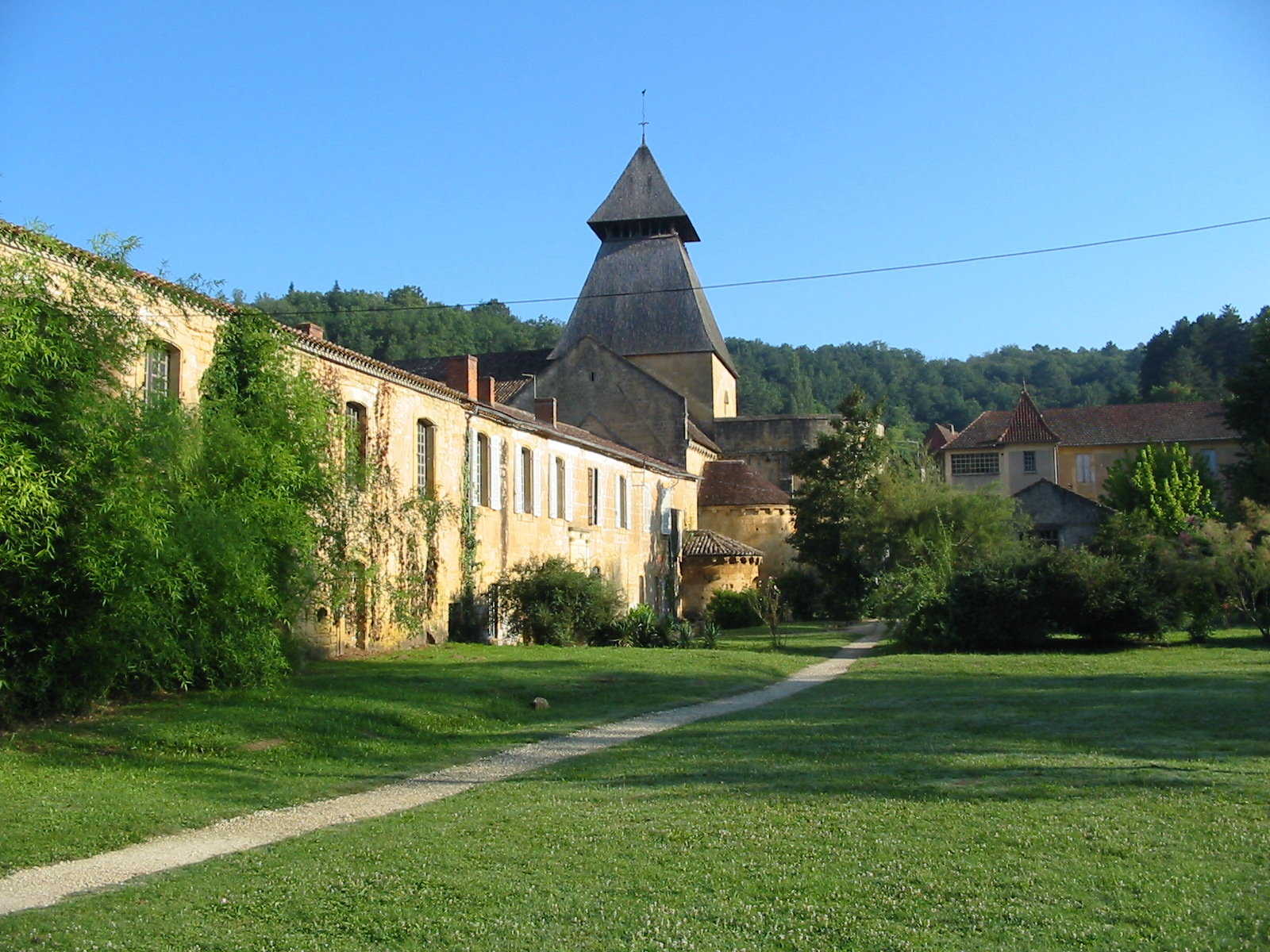
- Cadouin Abbey

- Coat of arms
- Location of Le Buisson-de-Cadouin
- Location within France Location within Nouvelle-Aquitaine
- Coordinates: 44°50′46″N 0°54′37″E
- Country: France
- Region: Nouvelle-Aquitaine
- Department: Dordogne
- Arrondissement: Bergerac
- Canton: Lalinde
- Intercommunality: Bastides Dordogne-Périgord

Government
  - Mayor (2020–2026): Marie-Lise Marsat
- Area^{1}: 50.37 km^{2} (19.45 sq mi)
- Elevation: 64 m (210 ft)
- Highest elevation: 248 m (814 ft)
- Lowest elevation: 43 m (141 ft)
- Population (2023): 1,965
  - Density: 39.01/km^{2} (101.0/sq mi)
- Time zone: UTC+01:00 (CET)
  - Summer (DST): UTC+02:00 (CEST)
- INSEE/Postal code: 24068 /24470
- ^{1} French Land Register data, which excludes lakes, ponds, glaciers > 1 km^{2} (0.386 sq mi or 247 acres) and river estuaries.

Le Buisson-de-Cadouin (French pronunciation: [lə bɥisɔ̃ də kadwɛ̃]; Occitan: Lo Boisson de Cadonh) is a commune in the Dordogne department in southwestern France. It is situated on the left bank of the river Dordogne. The Gare du Buisson is a railway junction, with connections to Bordeaux, Sarlat-la-Canéda, Agen and Périgueux.

== History ==
In 1893, the commune of Cabans was renamed Le Buisson. In 1960, Cussac and Le Buisson merged to form Le Buisson-Cussac. In 1974, the communes Cadouin, Le Buisson-Cussac, Paleyrac and Urval merged and formed the new commune Le-Buisson-de-Cadouin. Urval separated in 1989.

Cadouin Abbey (founded in 1115, dissolved in 1791) was formerly situated here.

== Population ==
Historical population
Year	Pop.	±% p.a.
1968	2,062	—
1975	2,078	+0.11%
1982	2,061	−0.12%
1990	2,003	−0.36%
1999	2,075	+0.39%
2007	2,151	+0.45%
2012	2,086	−0.61%
2017	1,954	−1.30%
2023	1,965	+0.09%
Source: INSEE

=== Demographics ===
- Students: 4.05%
- Single-parent families: 10.39%

=== Occupation ===
- Agriculture: 4%
- Commercial and manufacturing: 12%
- Services: 8%
- Intermediary professions: 14%
- Employees: 36%
- Labourers: 25%

== Sights ==
- Grotte de Cussac, a cave containing more than 100 prehistoric artworks
- Cadouin Abbey, 12th-century Cistercian monastery
- Jardin de Planbuisson

== See also ==
- Communes of the Dordogne department
