= Bouillac, Dordogne =

Bouillac
- Commune
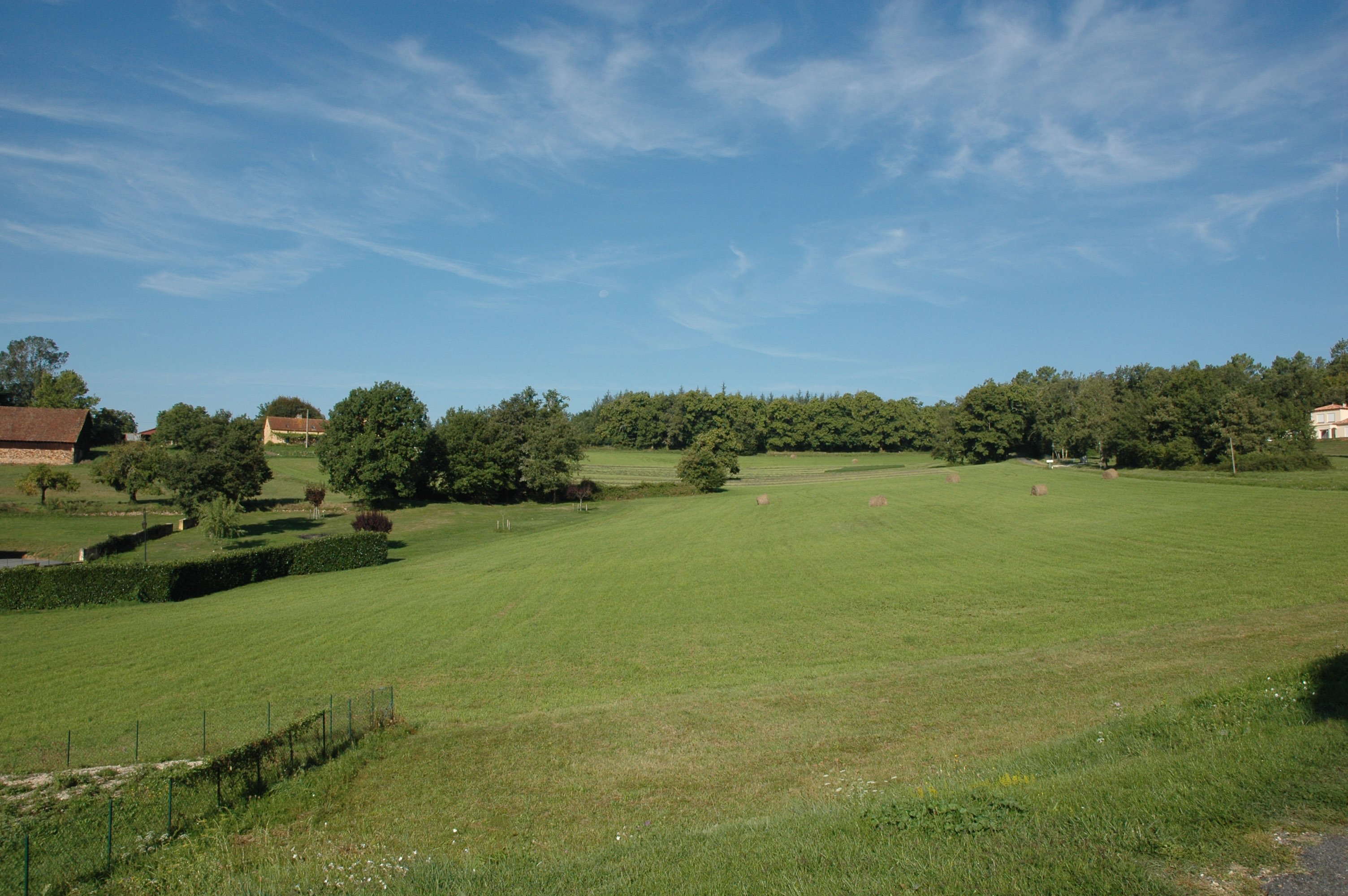
- A general view of Bouillac
- Location of Bouillac
- Location within France Location within Nouvelle-Aquitaine
- Coordinates: 44°45′38″N 0°55′13″E
- Country: France
- Region: Nouvelle-Aquitaine
- Department: Dordogne
- Arrondissement: Bergerac
- Canton: Lalinde

Government
  - Mayor (2020–2026): Paul-Mary Delfour
- Area^{1}: 12.34 km^{2} (4.76 sq mi)
- Elevation: 150 m (490 ft)
- Highest elevation: 243 m (797 ft)
- Lowest elevation: 121 m (397 ft)
- Population (2023): 121
  - Density: 9.81/km^{2} (25.4/sq mi)
- Time zone: UTC+01:00 (CET)
  - Summer (DST): UTC+02:00 (CEST)
- INSEE/Postal code: 24052 /24480
- ^{1} French Land Register data, which excludes lakes, ponds, glaciers > 1 km^{2} (0.386 sq mi or 247 acres) and river estuaries.

Bouillac (French pronunciation: [bujak]; Occitan: Bolhac) is a commune in the Dordogne department in southwestern France.

== Population ==
Historical population
Year	Pop.	±% p.a.
1968	139	—
1975	115	−2.67%
1982	97	−2.40%
1990	114	+2.04%
1999	119	+0.48%
2007	121	+0.21%
2012	130	+1.45%
2017	122	−1.26%
2023	121	−0.14%
Source: INSEE

== See also ==
- Communes of the Dordogne département
