= Einthoven (crater) =

Crater on the Moon

- Einthoven from Apollo 17
- Coordinates: 4.9°S 109.6°E
- Diameter: 73.94 km (45.94 mi)
- Colongitude: 251° at sunrise
- Formation: Nectarian
- Eponym: Willem Einthoven

Einthoven is a lunar impact crater that is located on the far side of the Moon. It is located beyond the region of the surface that is sometimes brought into view due to libration, and so it cannot be viewed from the Earth. Einthoven is located to the northeast of a huge walled plain called Pasteur.

This formation dates to the Nectarian period of the lunar geologic timescale. It is a circular crater with some minor terrace structure along the inner rim. The satellite crater Einthoven X is attached to the northwestern rim, and is partly overlaid by Einthoven. The hummocky interior floor is marked only by a small crater in the eastern half and a few tiny craterlets.

The crater is named after Dutch physiologist and Nobel laureate Willem Einthoven (1860-1927). Prior to formal naming by the International Astronomical Union in 1970, Einthoven was called Crater 273.

== Satellite craters ==
Satellite features of Einthoven

By convention these features are identified on lunar maps by placing the letter on the side of the crater midpoint that is closest to Einthoven.

Einthoven	Latitude	Longitude	Diameter
G	5.3° S	111.8° E	34 km
K	7.9° S	111.2° E	21 km
L	8.0° S	110.7° E	16 km
M	7.5° S	109.6° E	52 km
P	6.8° S	108.5° E	18 km
R	5.9° S	107.0° E	13 km
X	3.6° S	108.7° E	45 km
