= Mount Barbeston =

Mountain in Italy

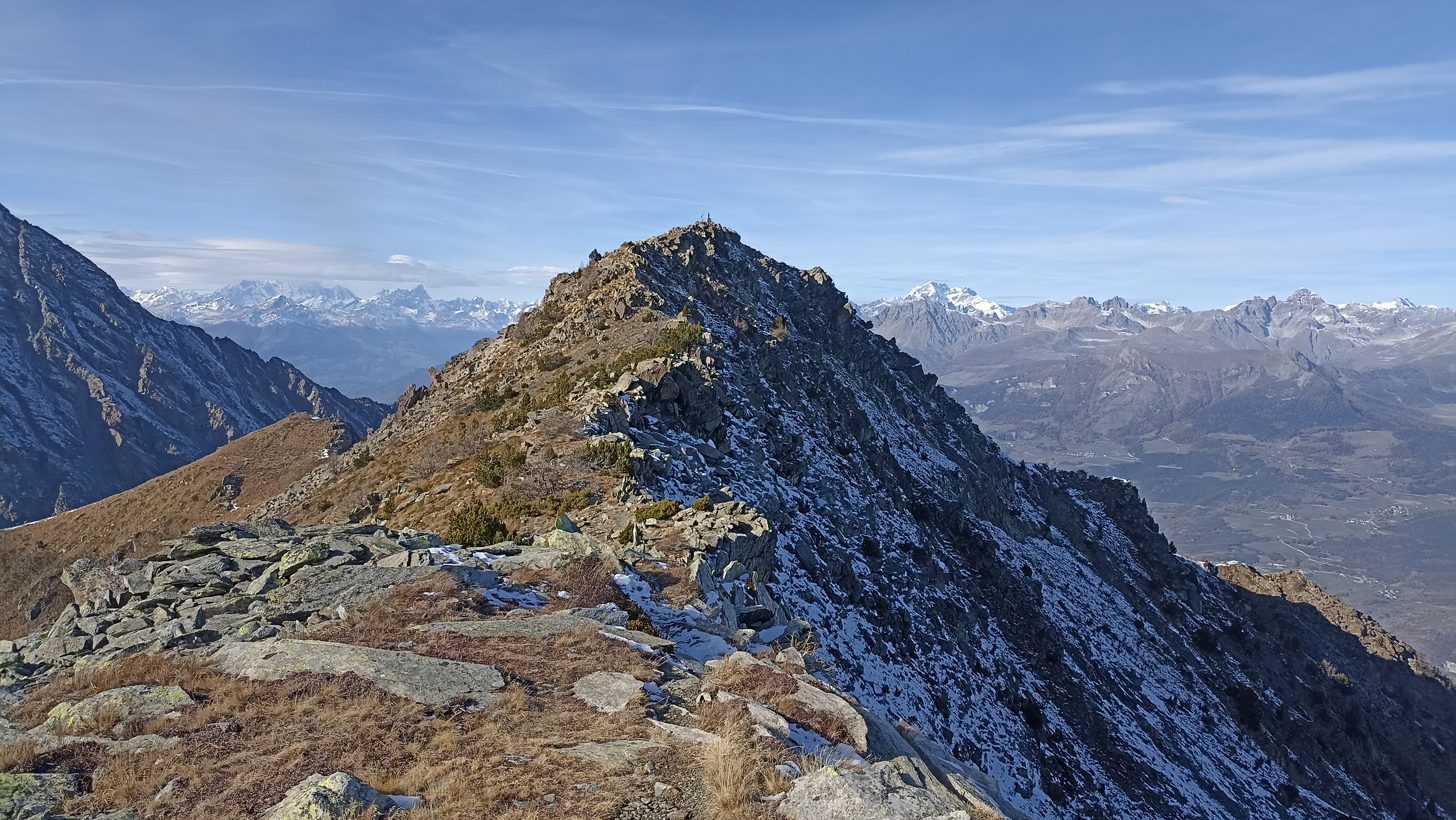
- The summit of Mount Barbeston from its eastern crest

Highest point
- Elevation: 2,482 m (8,143 ft)
- Coordinates: 45°42′08″N 7°35′52″E

Geography
- Location within Alps
- Location: Aosta Valley, Italy

Mount Barbeston (Italian: Monte Barbeston, French: Mont Barbeston) is a 2,482 m (8,143 ft) tall mountain of the Graian Alps in northern Italy. Its summit lies on the boundary between the municipalities of Châtillon, Pontey and Champorcher in the Aosta Valley, Italy.

== Description ==
Mount Barbeston stands on the ridge that, rising from the floor of the Aosta Valley, extends towards the south-west and culminates at Mont Avic (3,007 m, 9,865 ft). Mount Barbeston occupies the central section of this ridge, between Mount Lyan (2,178 m, 7,146 ft) and Mount Ruvic (2,922 m, 9,587 ft).

The summit offers panoramic views on the Aosta Valley.

== SOIUSA classification ==
According to the SOIUSA (International Standardized Mountain Subdivision of the Alps) the mountain can be classified in the following way:

- main part = Western Alps
- major sector = North Western Alps
- section = Graian Alps
- subsection = Alpi del Gran Paradiso
- supergroup = Catena Emilius-Tersiva
- group = Gruppo Glacier-Avic
- subgroup = Costiera del Monte Avic
