= Refuge Barbustel =

Refuge in the Alps in Aosta Valley, Italy

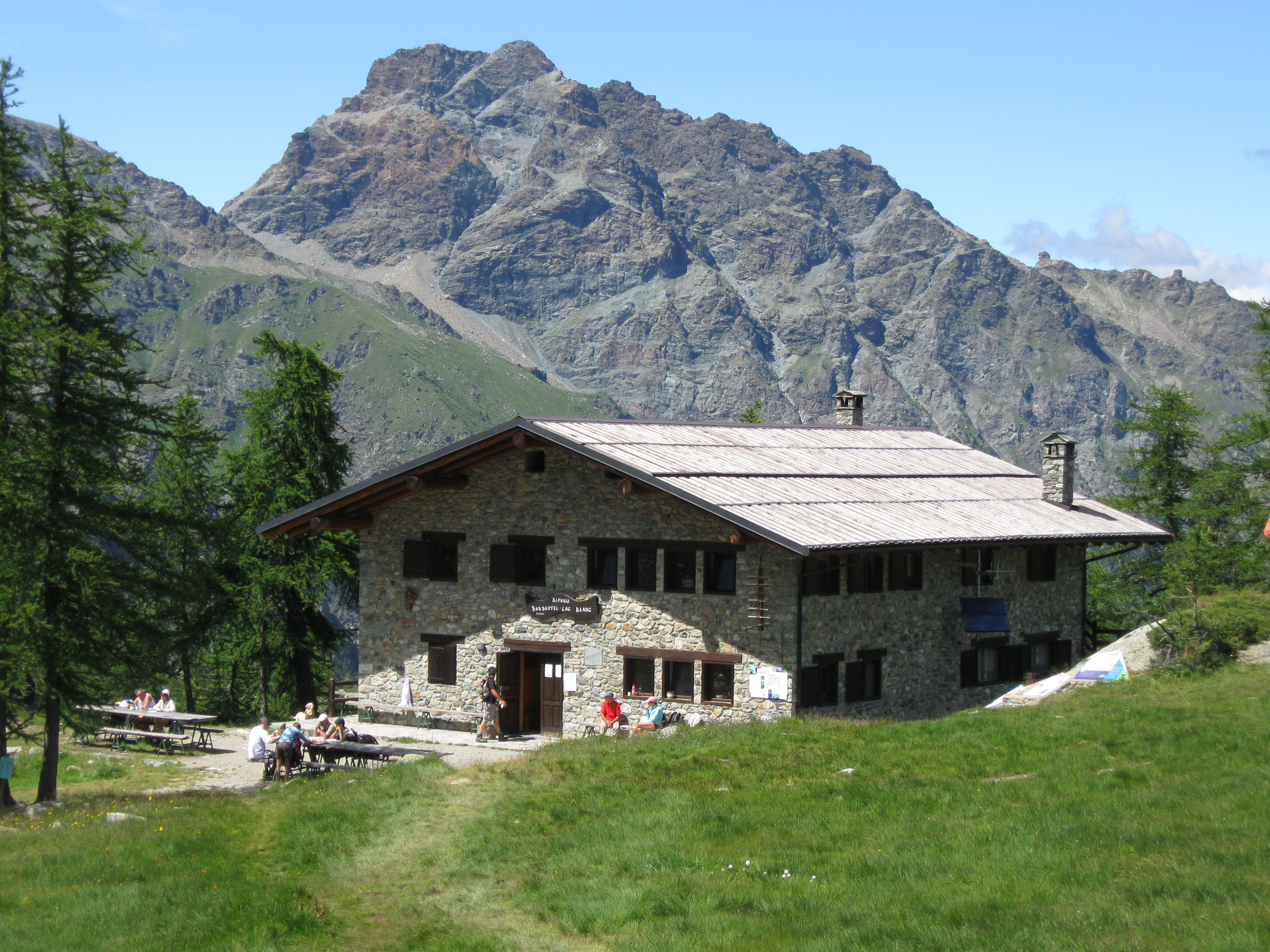
- Refuge Barbustel in 2010
- Interactive map of the Refuge Barbustel area

General information
- Type: mountain hut
- Location: Champdepraz, Aosta Valley, Italy
- Coordinates: 45.649187°N 7.588393°E

Refuge Barbustel Lac Blanc is an Alpine mountain hut located in Aosta Valley, Italy.

== Location ==
The refuge is located at 2,154 m (7,067 ft) of elevation in the heights of Champdepraz Valley within the Mont Avic Natural Park in the Graian Alps.

The building stands at the crossing of several hiking trails on a grassy plateau surrounded by numerous small alpine lakes, including Lake Cornu, Lake Blanc, Lake Noir, and Lake Vallette. From the refuge, visitors can enjoy panoramic views of several prominent peaks in the Aosta Valley, including Mont Avic, the Matterhorn, and the Monte Rosa.
