= Châtillon, Aosta Valley =

Châtillon Tchahtéyón (Valdôtain) Géschtullju (Walser)
- Comune
- Comune di Châtillon; Commune de Châtillon
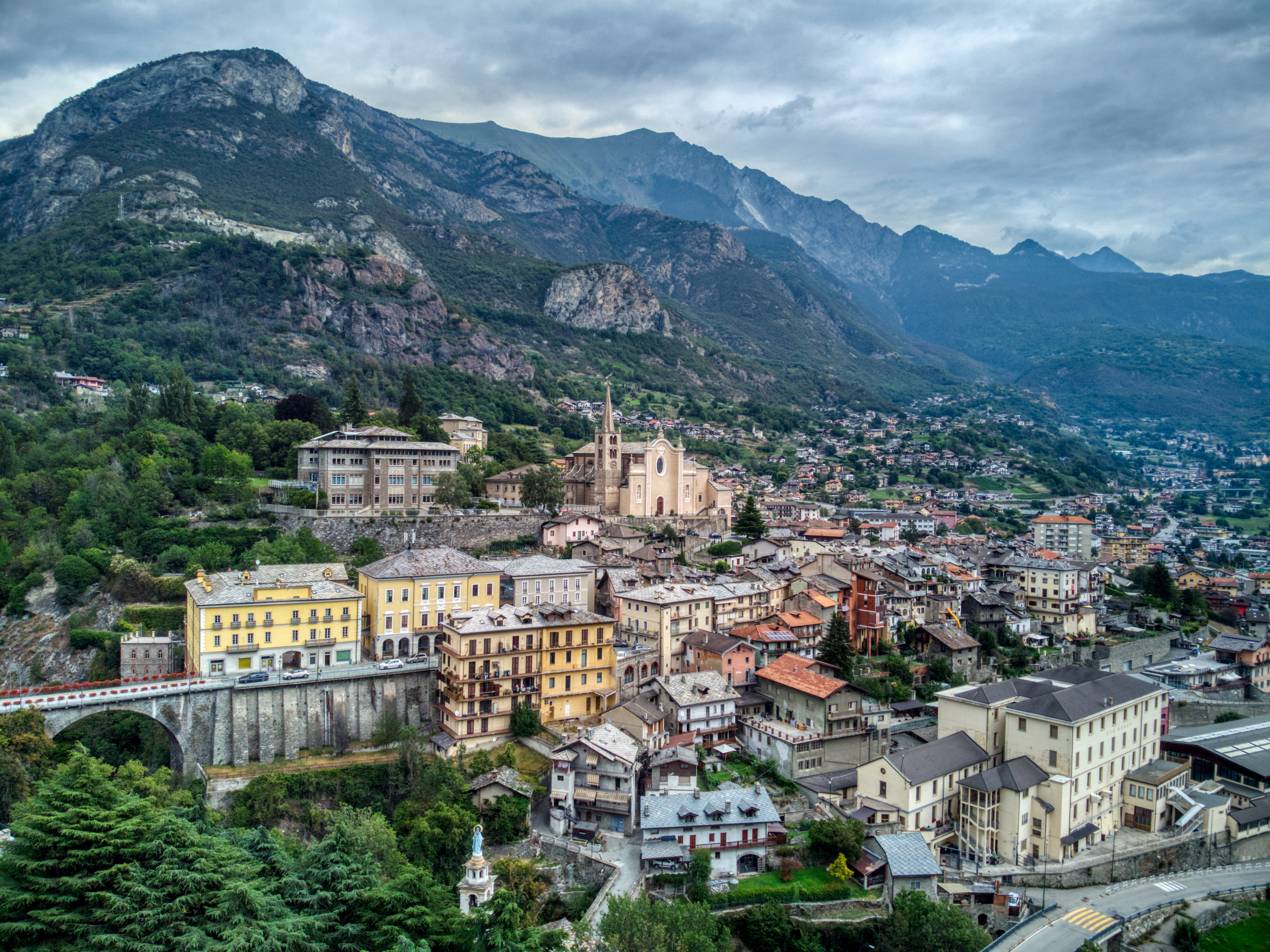

- Coat of arms

- Location within Italy Location within Aosta Valley
- Coordinates: 45°44′56″N 07°36′52″E
- Country: Italy
- Region: Aosta Valley
- Province: Aosta Valley
- Frazioni: see list

Area
  - Total: 39.68 km^{2} (15.32 sq mi)
- Elevation: 549 m (1,801 ft)

Population (2026)
  - Total: 4,299
  - Density: 108.3/km^{2} (280.6/sq mi)
- Demonym: Châtillonnais
- Time zone: UTC+1 (CET)
  - Summer (DST): UTC+2 (CEST)
- Postal code: 11024
- Dialing code: 0177
- Patron saint: St. Peter
- Saint day: June 29
- Website: Official website

Châtillon (French: [ʃatijɔ̃]; Valdôtain: Tchahtéyón; Issime Walser: Géschtullju); is a town and comune (municipality) in the autonomous region of the Aosta Valley in northwestern Italy. It has 4,299 inhabitants.

Châtillon borders the municipalities of Antey-Saint-André, Ayas, Champdepraz, La Magdeleine, Montjovet, Pontey, Saint-Denis, Saint-Vincent, and Torgnon.

== Name ==
Châtillon was renamed "Castiglion Dora" in Italian in 1939 during Fascist rule in Italy. It was reverted to its original name in 1946.

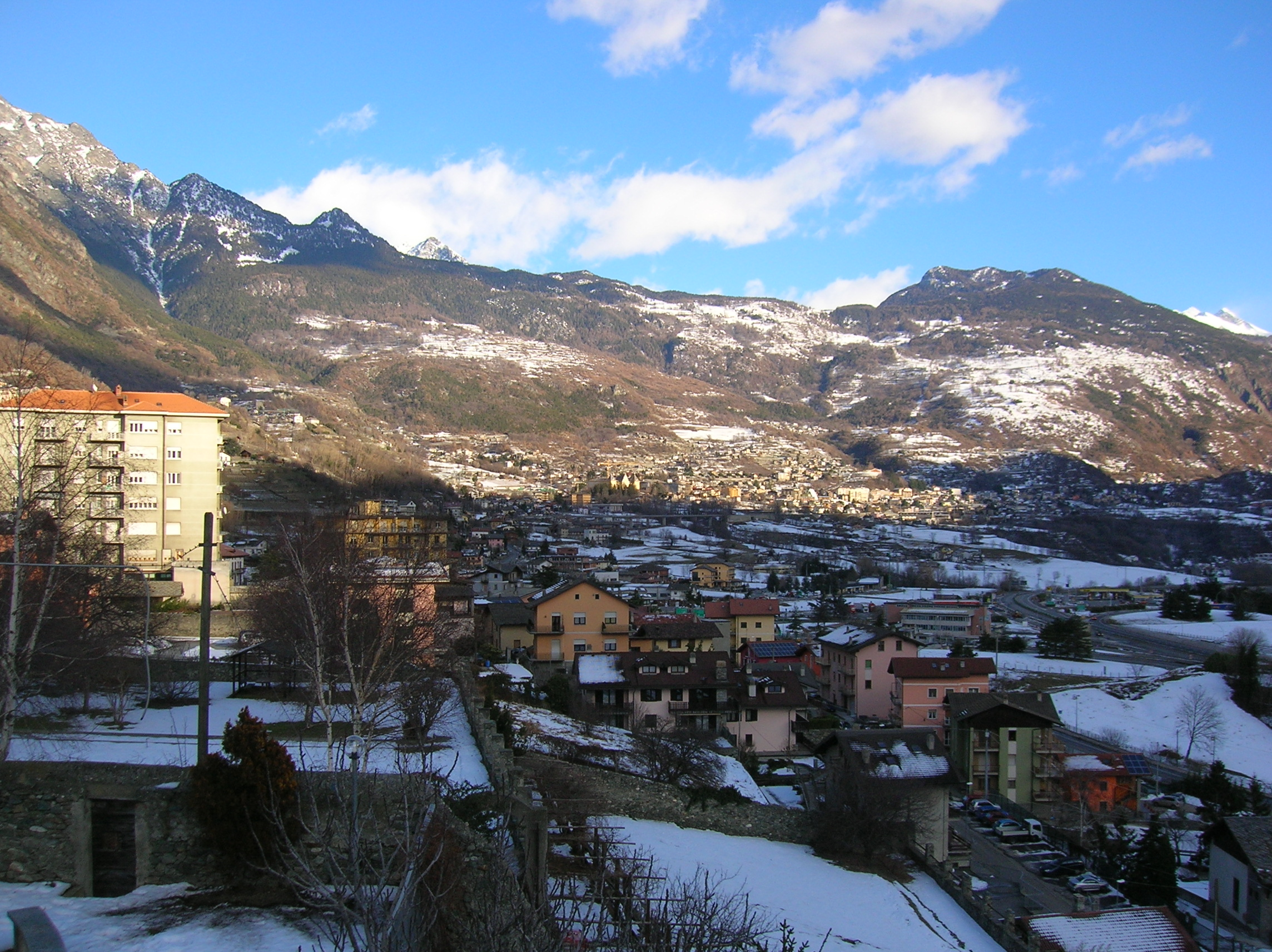
Winter panorama of Châtillon.

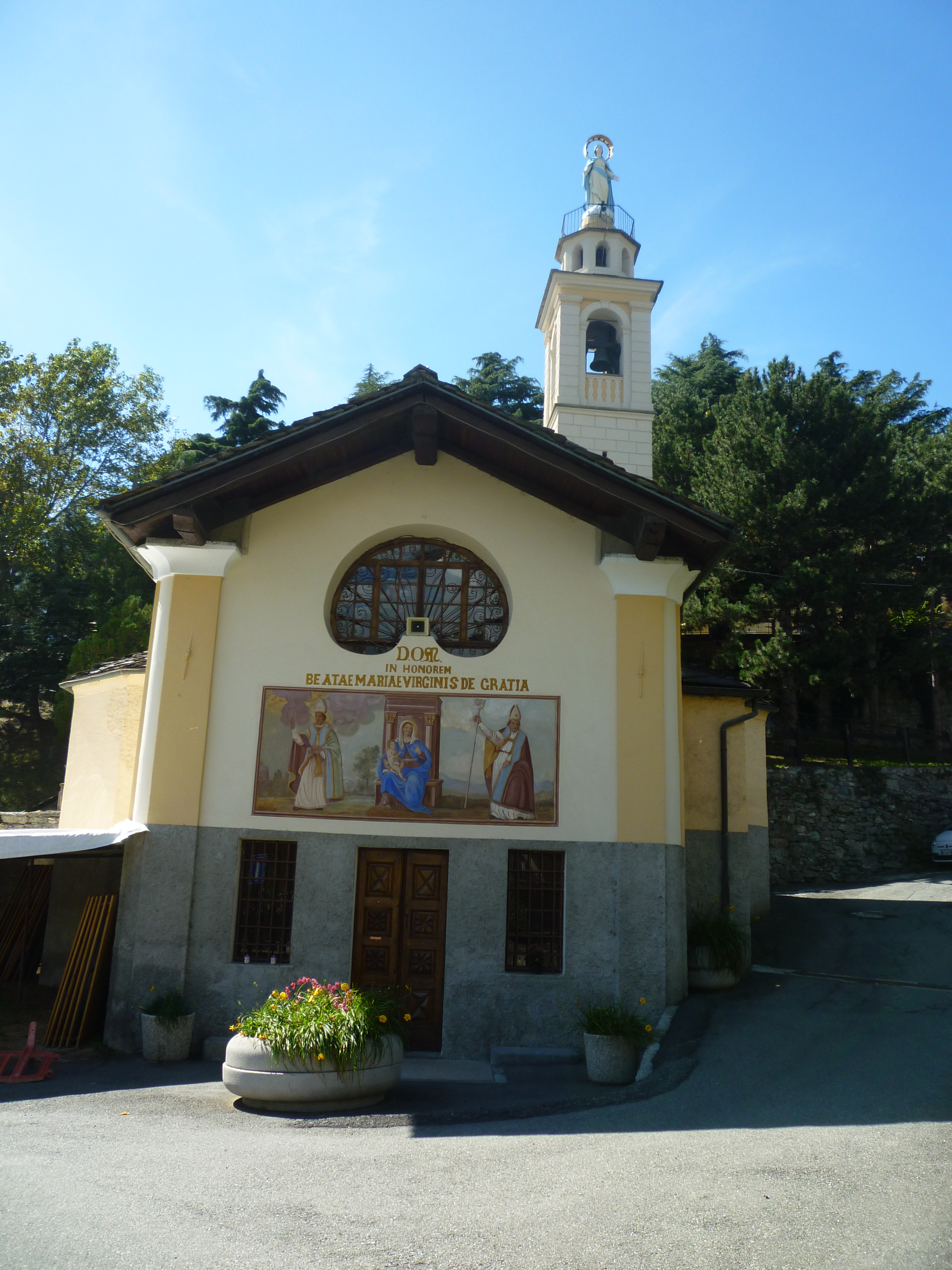
The church of Notre-Dame-de-Grâces.

== Hameaux ==
Albard, Les Arsines, Assert, Bacquéret, Barat, La Barme-des-Antesans, Barmafol, Barmusse, Bellecombe, Bertinaz, Biaveusse, Les Biolasses, Biovre, Boësse, Les Boëttes, Breil-de-Barrel (Petit-Breil), Gros-Breil, Brun, Bourg, Le Brenvey, Breton, Brusoncles, Brusoncles-des-Gard (Brusoncles-Dessus), Brusoncles-des-Janin (Brusoncles-Dessous), Chaméran, Champ, Champeillon, Champ-Long, Champ-Cellier, Chardin, Chavod, Le Cheney, Chésallet, Cillod, Les Cloîtres, Closel, Conoz, Crêt-Blanc, Crêt-de-Breil, Le Crêt, Crétadonaz, Crétaz, Crétaz-Chardon, Les Dévies, Domianaz, L'Étavey, Étrop, Fontanellaz, La Fournaise, Les Fours, Francou, Grand-Freyan, Petit-Freyan, Frassiney, Garin, Jacquemet, Gléréyaz, Govergnou, Les Grands-Prés, Grange-de-Barme, Les Îles, Isseuries, Larianaz, La Marcaz, Merlin, Murates, Mont-Ros, Morasset, Moriolaz, Neyran, Nissod, Nouarsaz, La Nouvaz, Pavirolaz, Les Pérolles, Perrianaz, Perry, Pie, Pissin, Plan-Pissin, Plantin, Pointé, Praz-Carral, Praz-Garin, Praz-Négoz, Prélaz, Promiod, Rumélaz, Revard, Saint-Valentin, Saint-Clair, Salé, La Salère, Sarmasse, Salèche, Selotaz, Serviou, Sétoret, Saix-de-Val, Soleil, Solettaz, Sopien, La Sounère, Taxard, Les Toles, Tollein, Toniquet, Tornafol, Tour-de-Grange, La Tour, Travod, Ussel, Varé, Ventoux, La Verdettaz, Verlex.

== Demographics ==
As of 2026, the population is 4,299, of which 49.0% are male, and 51.0% are female. Minors make up 12.3% of the population, and seniors make up 27.0%.

Historical population

Year	Pop.	±%
1861	3,134	—
1871	2,778	−11.4%
1881	2,903	+4.5%
1901	3,061	+5.4%
1911	2,839	−7.3%
1921	2,927	+3.1%
1931	4,098	+40.0%
1936	3,216	−21.5%

Year	Pop.	±%
1951	3,965	+23.3%
1961	3,894	−1.8%
1971	4,345	+11.6%
1981	4,657	+7.2%
1991	4,632	−0.5%
2001	4,712	+1.7%
2011	4,946	+5.0%
2021	4,402	−11.0%

Source: ISTAT

=== Immigration ===
As of 2025, immigrants make up 12.4% of the population. The 5 largest foreign countries of birth are Morocco, Romania, France, Brazil, and Albania.

== Notable people ==
Châtillon is the ancestral home of the Bich family, whose most famous member was Marcel Bich, founder of Société Bic.
