= La Magdeleine, Aosta Valley =

La Magdeleine La Madéléna (Valdôtain)
- Comune
- Comune di La Magdeleine; Commune de La Magdeleine
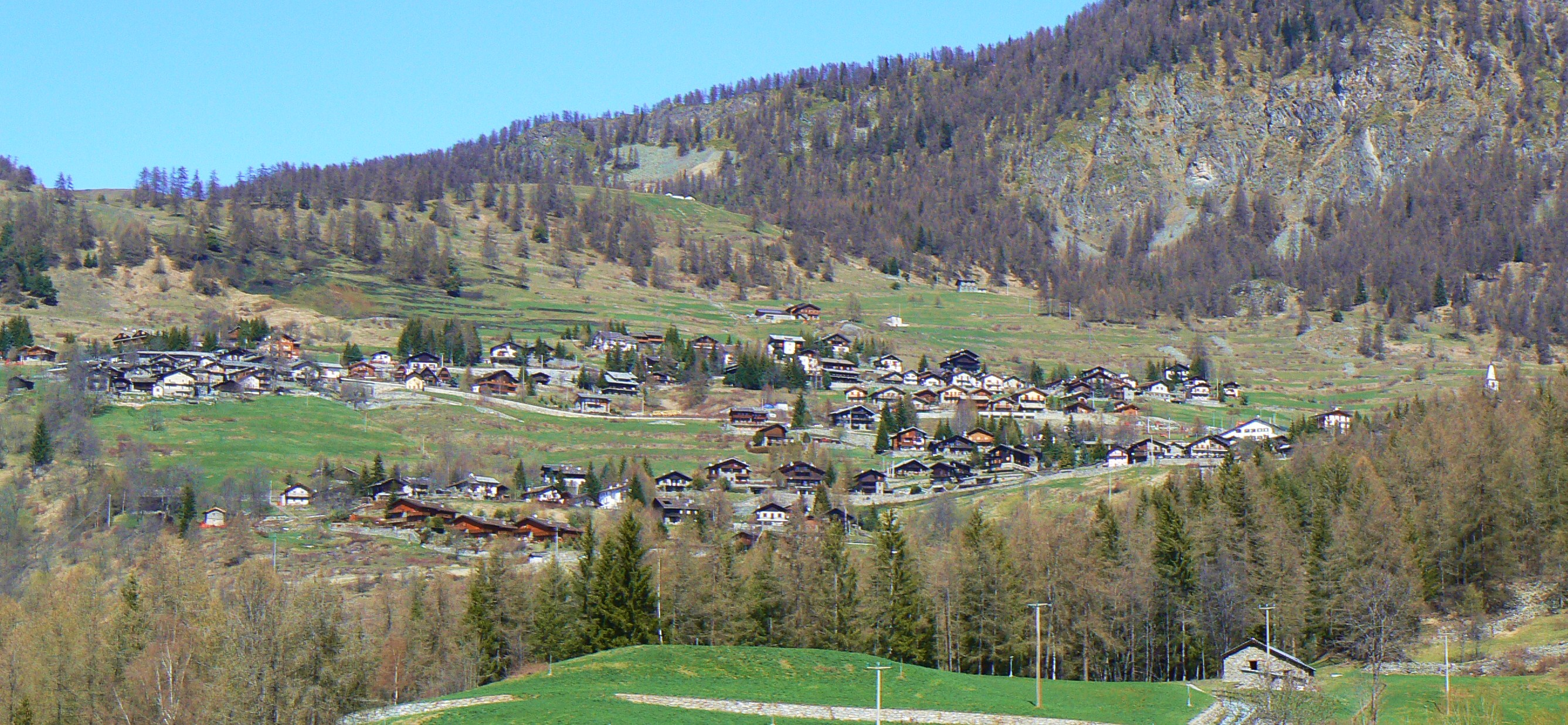

- Coat of arms

- Location within Italy Location within Aosta Valley
- Coordinates: 45°49′N 7°37′E
- Country: Italy
- Region: Aosta Valley
- Province: none
- Frazioni: Artaz, Brengon, Clou, Messelod, Vieu

Area
  - Total: 8 km^{2} (3.1 sq mi)
- Elevation: 1,644 m (5,394 ft)

Population (31 December 2022)
  - Total: 104
  - Density: 13/km^{2} (34/sq mi)
- Time zone: UTC+1 (CET)
  - Summer (DST): UTC+2 (CEST)
- Postal code: 11020
- Dialing code: 0166
- Saint day: 23 July
- Website: Official website

La Magdeleine (French: [la madəlɛn]; Valdôtain: La Madéléna) is a town and comune in the Aosta Valley region of north-west Italy.

== Description ==
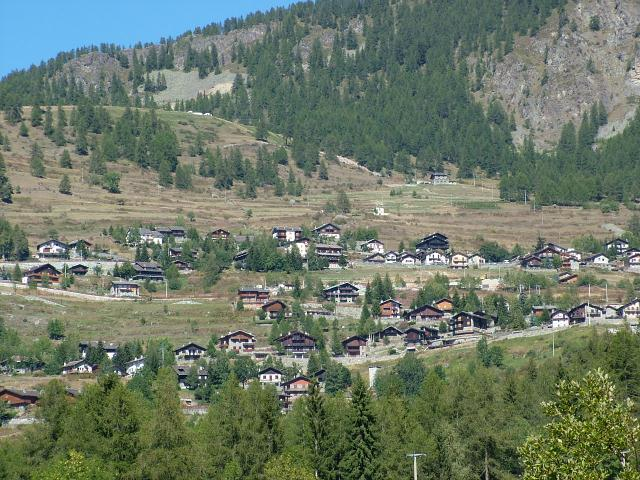
The town in spring

La Magdeleine is a small ski resort featuring easy slopes, a nordic ski touring route and a snow park for children. It is also a launching base for hand-glider flights. At an altitude of 1,644 m (5,394 ft), it is located on the left bank of the Marmore river, in the middle of the Valtournenche Valley.

The centre of La Magdeleine is located in the hamlet of Vieu.

The municipality features eight mills, powered by water from a small river, whose origins date back to the XVIII century.

La Magdeleine is home to many chapels, including one built in the 1600s which is dedicated to Saint Roch, in the hamlet of Messelod, and Notre-Dame-de-la-Neige, located in the hamlet of Vieu. The Saint Mary Magdalene church is dedicated to the patron saint Mary Magdalene, who gives the name to the municipality itself as well.

Paleontological remains found at a height of more than 2,000 m (6,600 ft) (on the slopes of Mount Tantané) suggest that this area was populated during the first Iron Age. In medieval times, La Magdeleine was part of the Cly fief and was economically linked to Châtillon.

The territory of the comune comprises several alpine lakes, including Champlong Lakes and Lake Charey.
