= Notre-Dame-de-la-Neige, La Magdeleine =

Notre-Dame-de-la-Neige
- Chapelle Notre-Dame-de-la-Neige (French)
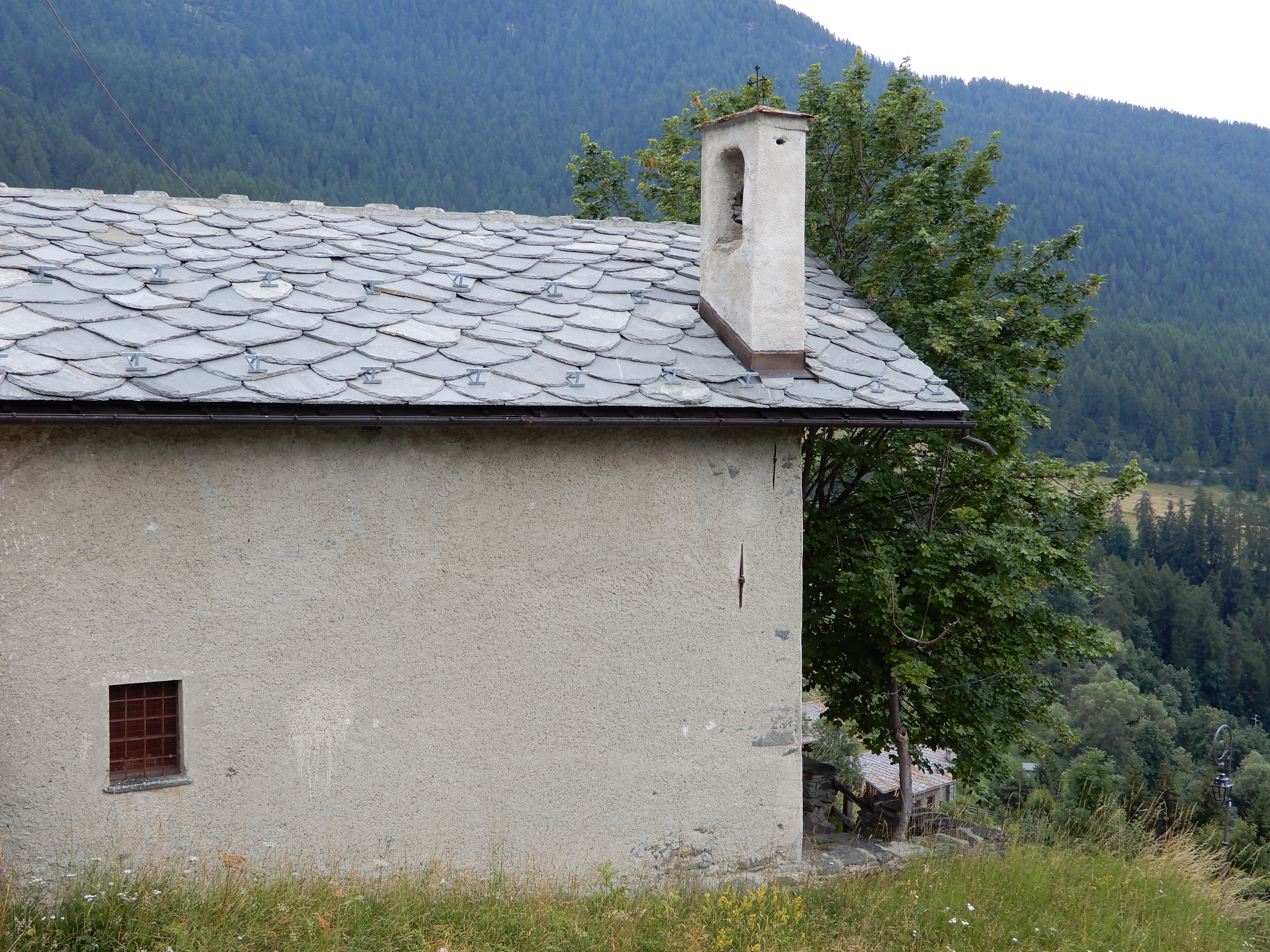
- Notre-Dame-de-la-Neige, La Magdeleine in 2021
- Click on the map for a fullscreen view
- 45°48′45.5″N 7°36′56.47″E
- Location: La Magdeleine
- Country: Italy
- Denomination: Roman Catholic

Architecture
- Functional status: Active

Administration
- Diocese: Diocese of Aosta

Notre-Dame-de-la-Neige is a Roman Catholic chapel located in La Magdeleine, Italy.

== History ==
The chapel was built in 1739 thanks to a bequest from Anne-Marie Vittaz Dujany.

== Description ==
The church stands in the hamlet of Vieu, on a site characterized by a particularly steep slope, and has a single nave. It is preceded by a small churchyard enclosed by low stone walls and shaded by two trees, which is reached via a steep stone staircase. The interior is rather austere; among the few decorative elements is an altarpiece depicting the Virgin Mary with the Child Jesus, with a female saint and Saint Gratus at her feet.

== Gallery ==
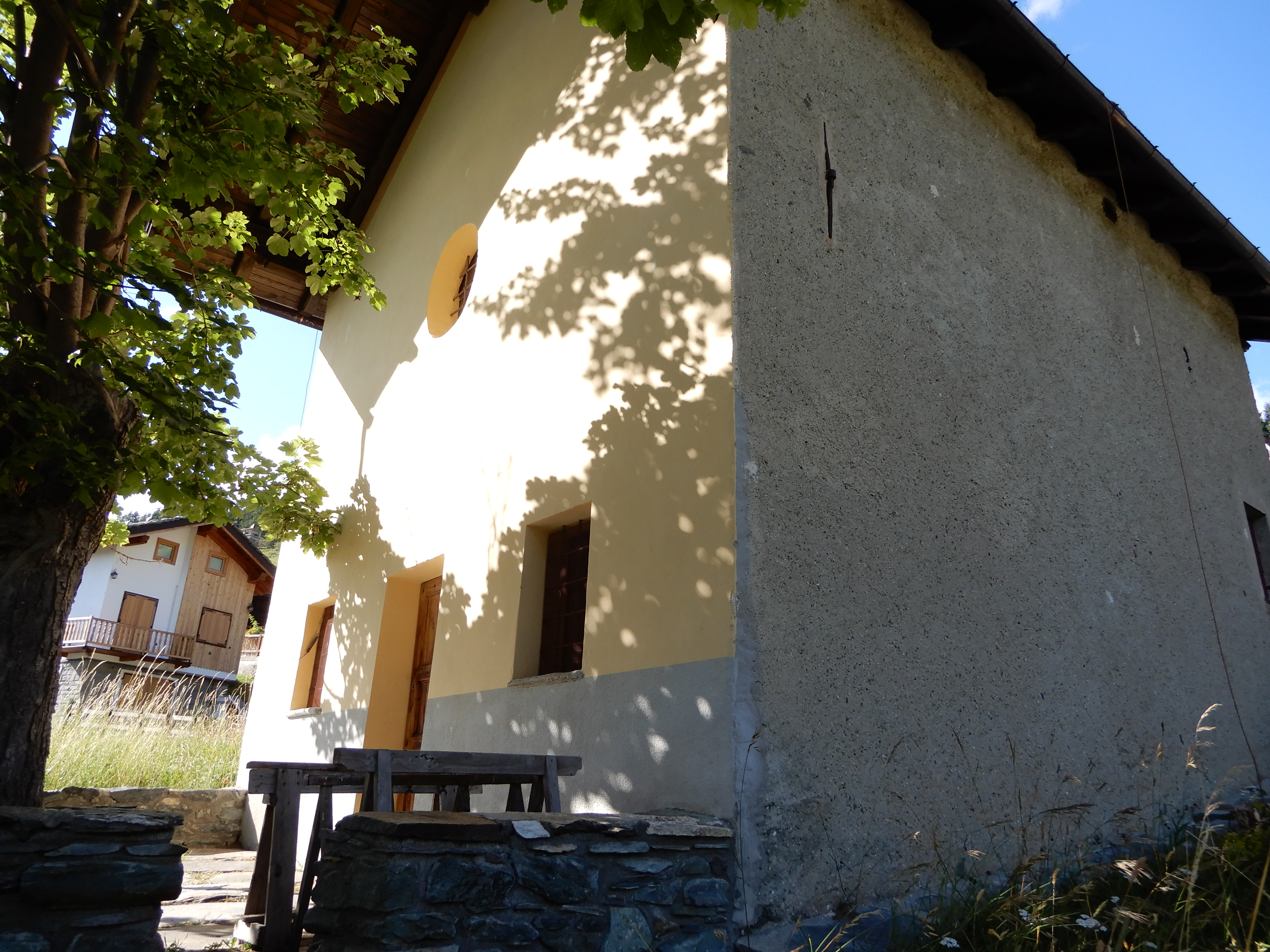

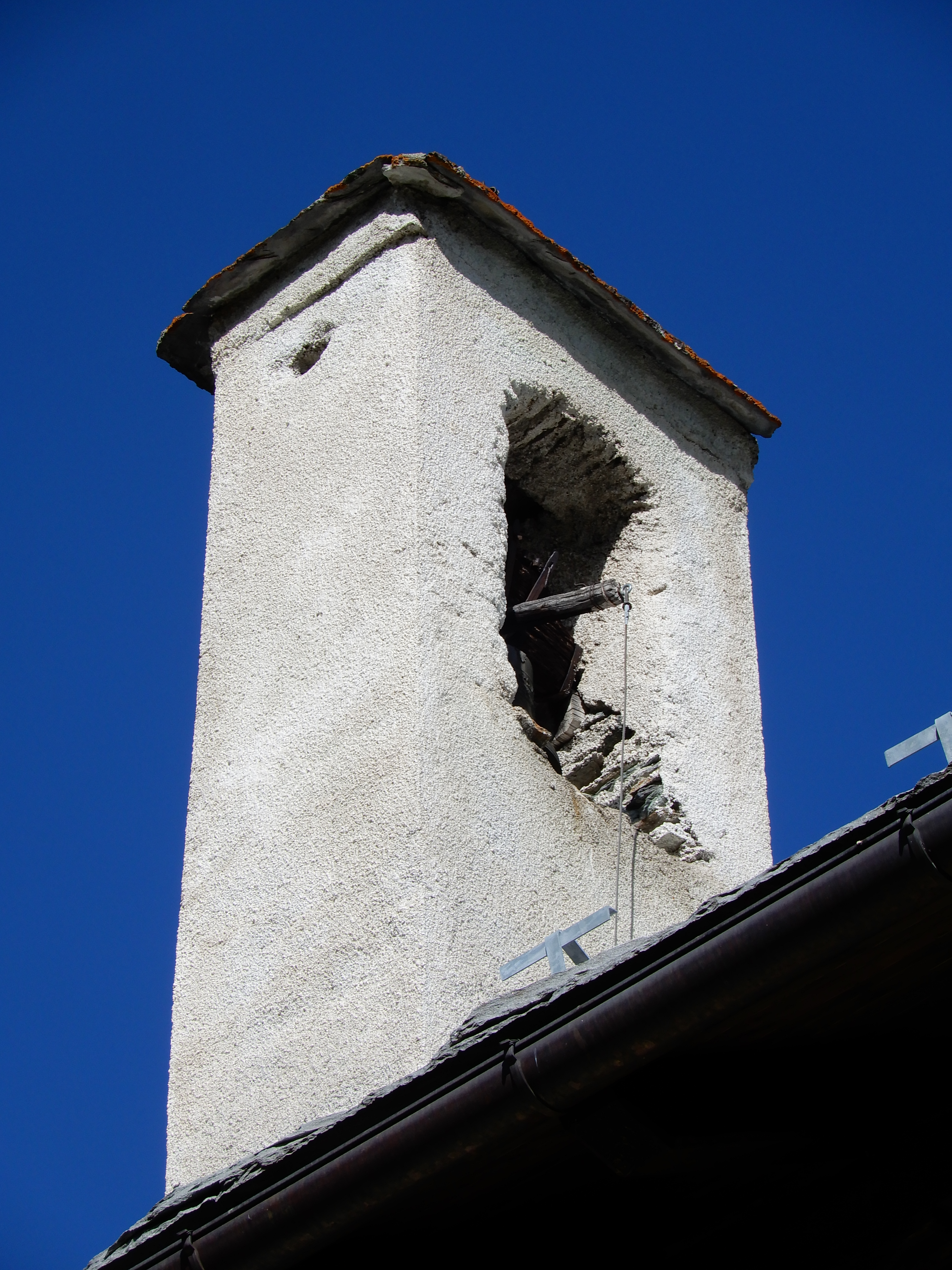

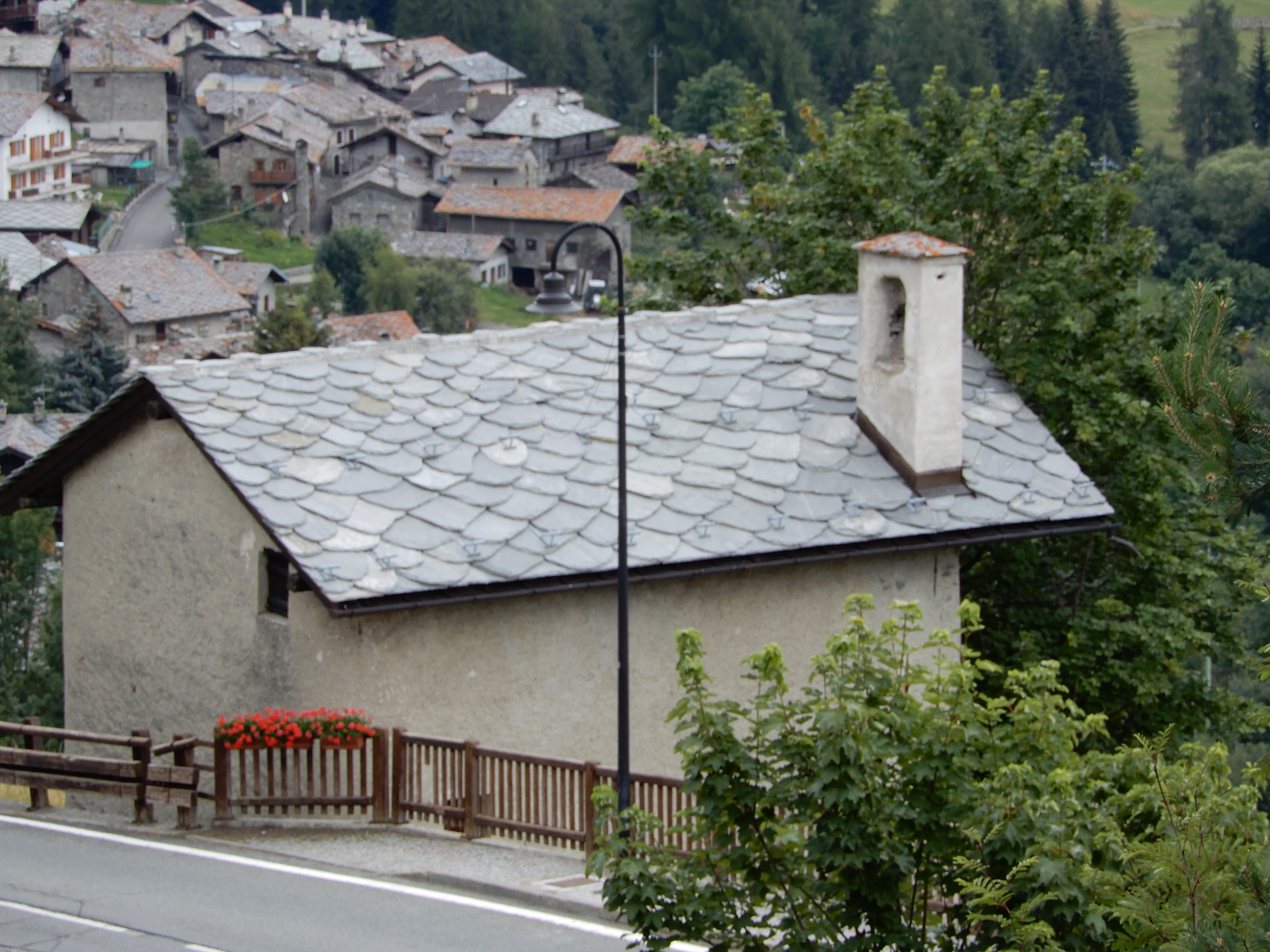

== See also ==
- Saint Mary Magdalene church
