= Champlong Lakes =

Lakes in the Aosta Valley, Northern Italy

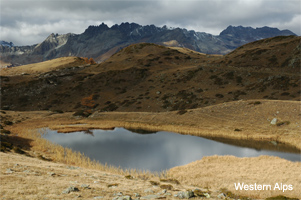
- Champlong Lakes in 2006

- Location within Aosta Valley
- Location: La Magdeleine, Aosta Valley
- Coordinates: 45.824°N 7.6451°E
- Basin countries: Italy
- Surface elevation: 2,300 m (7,500 ft)

Champlong Lakes (Italian: Laghi di Champlong, French: Lacs de Champlong) are a group of three alpine lakes located in La Magdeleine, Aosta Valley, Italy.

== Description ==
The lakes are located at about 2,300 m (7,500 ft) above sea level in a grassy basin, at the foot of the rugged northwestern slope of Mount Tantané. The three bodies of water are positioned at different levels, with slightly varying altitudes, offering panoramic views, with a wide view of the western side of Valtournenche Valley, as well as the major peaks on the right bank of the central Dora Baltea valley, particularly Mount Emilius.

The lakes can be reached with an easy walk, mainly on a dirt road, starting from an altitude of about 1,900 m (6,200 ft) from the road that connects La Magdeleine to the Col de la Pilaz mountain pass. The hike requires a gain of about 477 m (1,565 ft) in elevation (including any descent), as well as 1 hour and 30 minutes of walking. The route also passes by Lake Charey.
