= Pontey =

Pontey Pounté (Valdôtain)
- Comune
- Comune di Pontey; Commune de Pontey
- Location within Italy Location within Aosta Valley
- Coordinates: 45°44′N 7°35′E
- Country: Italy
- Region: Aosta Valley
- Province: none
- Frazioni: Clapey, Cloutraz, Crétaz, Crétaz-Boson, Épiney, La Bovaye, Lassolaz (chef-lieu), Lézin, Prélaz, Prolex, Semon, Torin, Tzésanouva, Valérod, Dzerbio, Mesaney

Area
  - Total: 15 km^{2} (5.8 sq mi)
- Elevation: 525 m (1,722 ft)

Population (31 December 2022)
  - Total: 790
  - Density: 53/km^{2} (140/sq mi)
- Demonym: Pontesans
- Time zone: UTC+1 (CET)
  - Summer (DST): UTC+2 (CEST)
- Postal code: 11024
- Dialing code: 0166
- ISTAT code: 7051
- Patron saint: Martin of Tours
- Saint day: 11 November
- Website: Official website

Pontey French pronunciation (Valdôtain: Pounté) is a town and comune in the Aosta Valley region of north-western Italy.

Pontey is located on the right bank (envers) of the Doire baltée, the main river in the Aosta Valley, about 24 kilometers east of the regional capital Aosta.

== Geography ==
=== Territory ===
The town is located at an altitude of 1,722 ft (525 meters) above sea level, bordered by the towns of Chambave, Saint-Denis, Châtillon and Champdepraz and culminates with the top of the reaches Mont Ruvic in 9,587 ft (2,922 meters)
In the municipal area, there are three streams called Molinaz, Eau-Noire (or Éve Née in Valdôtain patois, which means "Black Water") and Vau.

=== Hamlets ===
Unofficial names of the hamlets in Valdôtain patois are indicated in brackets: Clapey, Cloutraz (Quiótra), Crétaz, Crétaz-Boson, Épiney, Bosayes (La Bóvàye), Lassolaz (La Sóla - chef-lieu), Lesin (Lizén), Prélaz (Préla), Prolex, Semont (Semón), Torin (Tòén), Chesanouva (Tséza Noua), Vallerod (Valïoù), Dzerbio, Mesaney.

=== Climate ===
The location of the village on the right bank of the central valley (the envers) means that it is subject to a microclimate very different countries sites on the left bank (the so-called adret).

Indeed, winter mountains in which the country is leaning maintain overshadow the country for two months from November 20 to January 30, for this reason the temperatures drop in a much more decisive and touch the 14 °F (−10 °C) during the day, with peaks at night in exceptional years of −22 °F (−30 °C).

During the summer because of its location enjoys greater solar illumination compared to neighboring towns, and because of that the calculation of hours of sunshine throughout the year is substantially equal.

The country is located in climate zone E (2,971 Celsius Degrees Day) but under the regional contributions for heating all the municipalities of Aosta Valley are valued as climate zone F.

== History ==
During the Fascist period, Pontey was merged to the municipality of Châtillon, at the time called Castiglione Dora, due to the Italianization programme.

The original toponym and the municipality were restored in 1946.

== Origin of the name ==
The name probably derives from Latin "ponticulus", meaning "little bridge".

== Monuments and places of interest ==
=== Religious Architecture ===
References to the church are in a papal of 1176 of Pope Alexander III, which is part of the community Diocese of Aosta.

On the territory there are three church buildings: the parish church dedicated to St. Martin of Tours and dated around 1400, the Chapel of the Holy Cross (formerly dedicated to St. Roch, located in the hamlet Banchet) and the chapel of Sorrows (Torin hamlet).

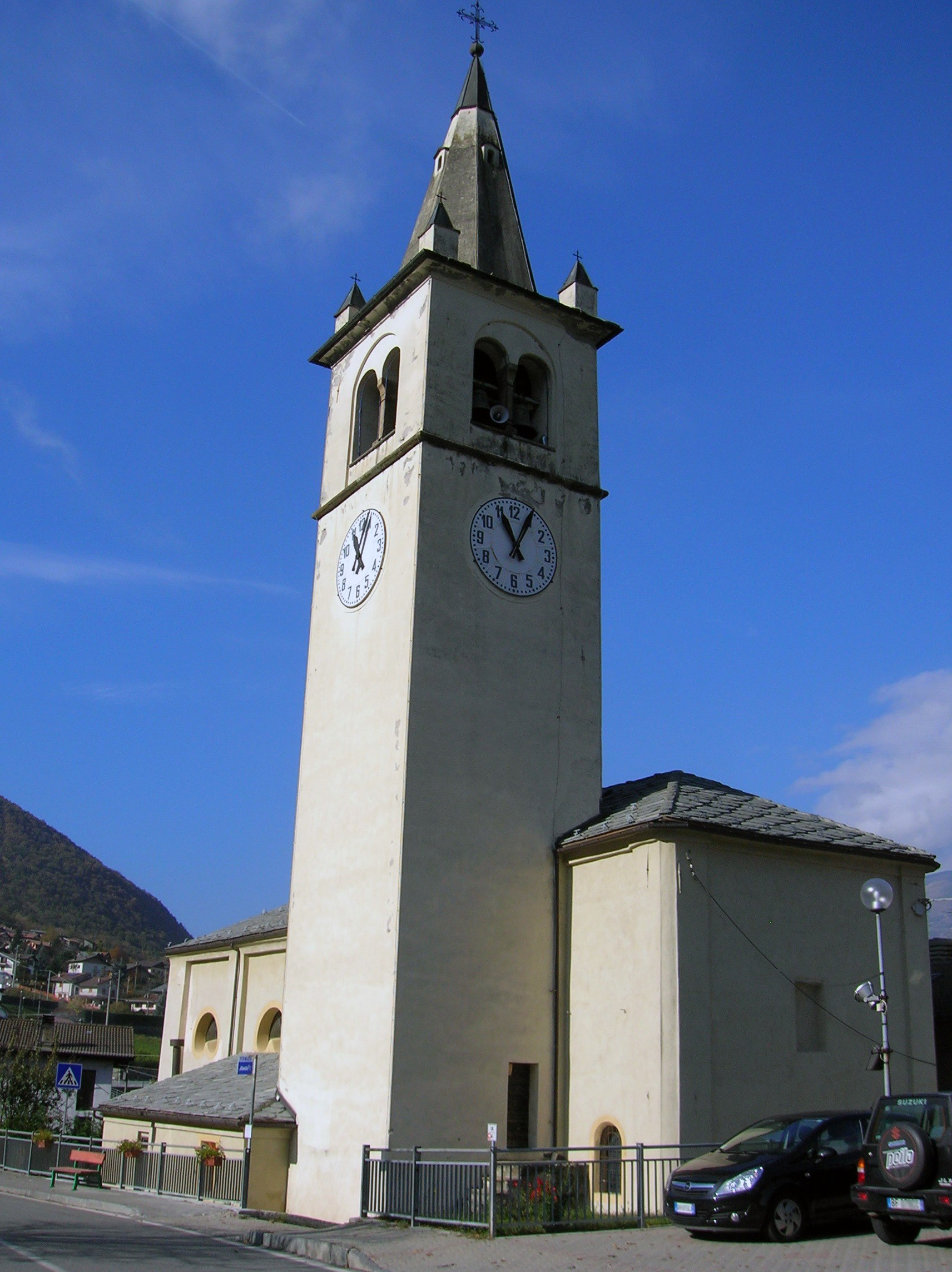
The parish church of St. Martin of Tours

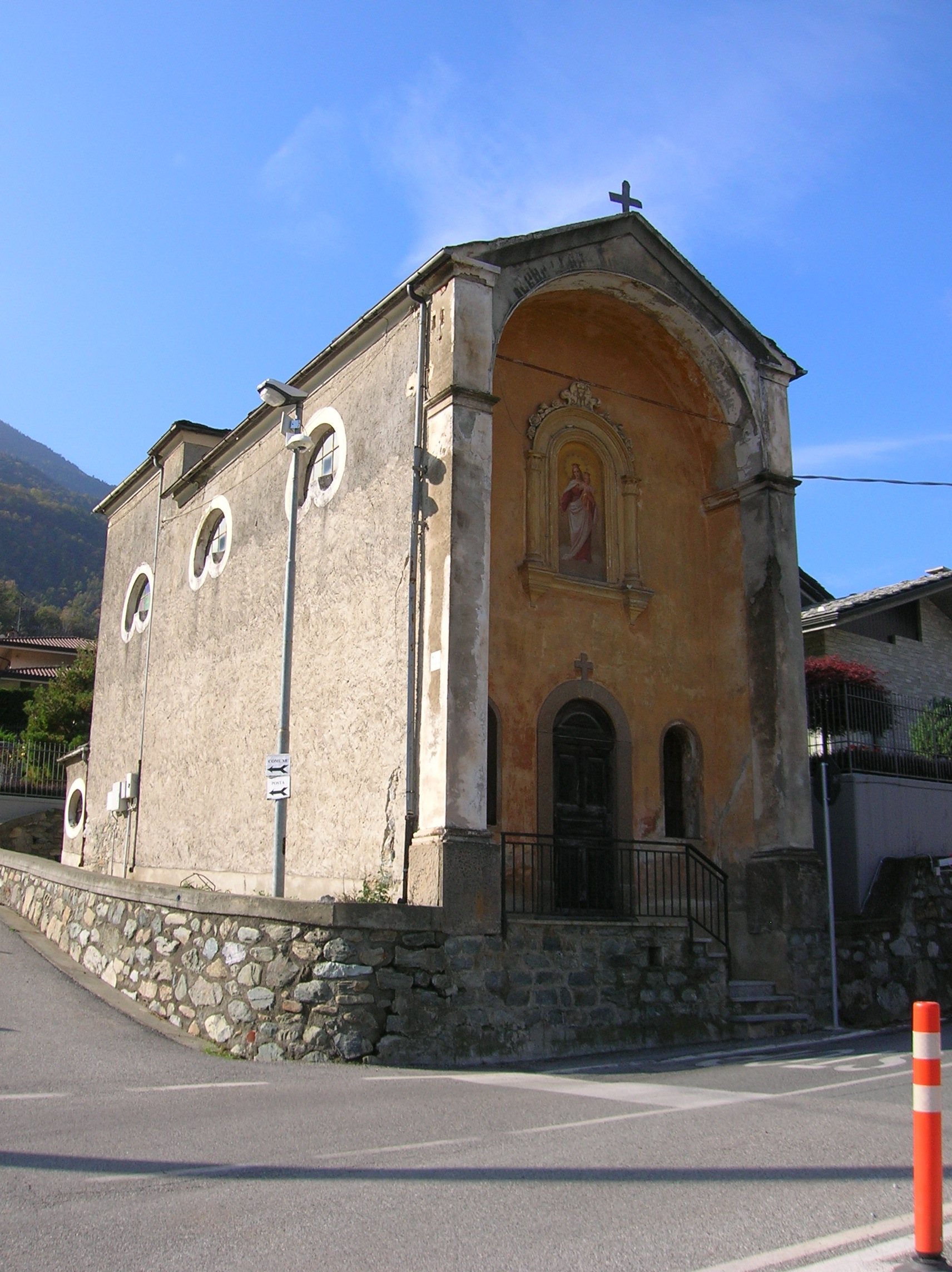
The church near the town hall

=== Civil architectures ===
In Plan-Coca are the remains of industrial archeology "Le grand fourneau", French for big furnace, a blast furnace dating from the eighteenth century, while in Ussert are located the remains of the "foundry" Gervasone.

== Society ==
=== Languages and dialects ===
As in the rest of the Aosta Valley, in Pontey too is spoken the Valdôtain dialect.

== Infrastructure and transport ==
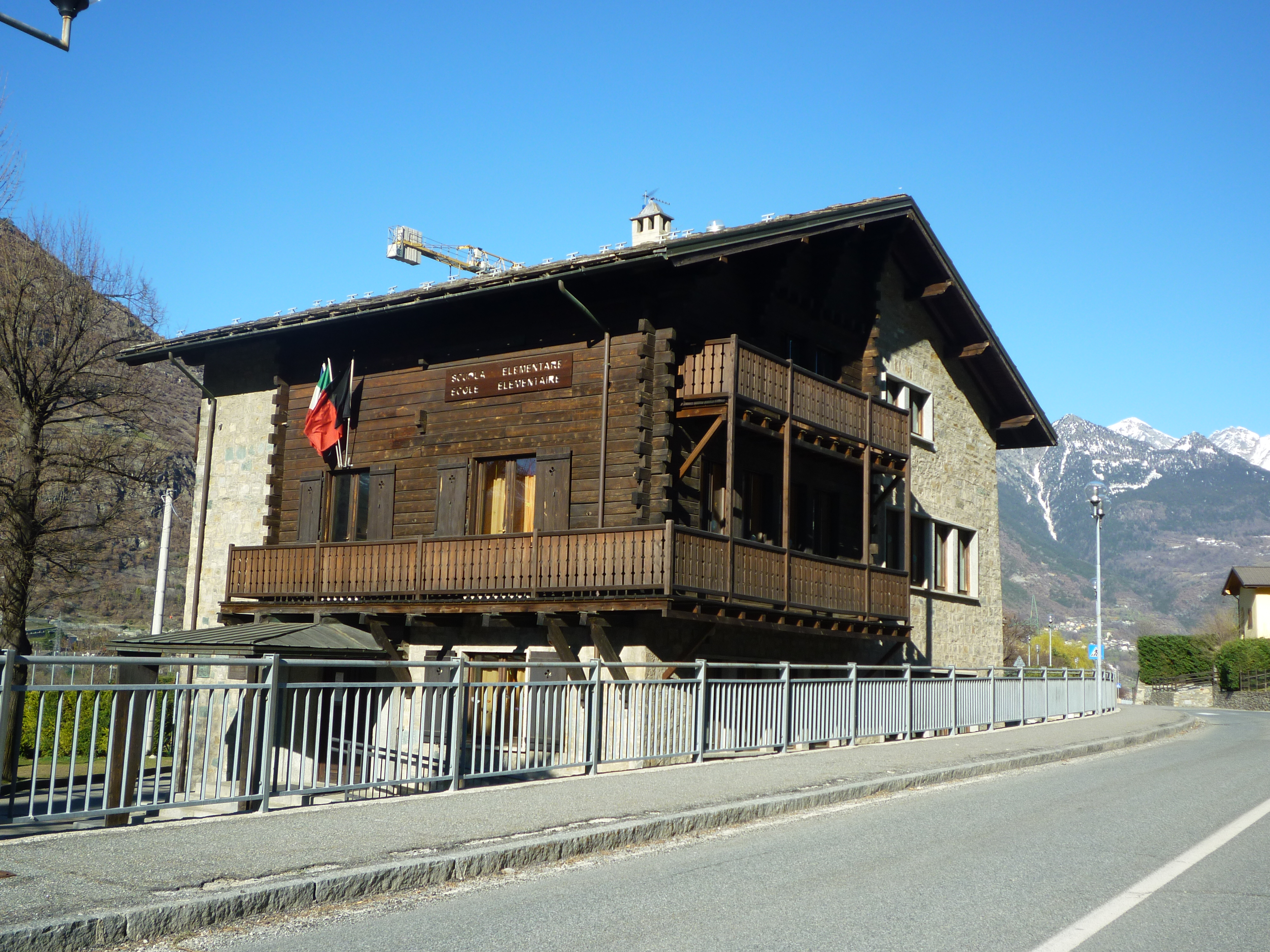
The elementary school.

=== Education ===
The municipality has a primary school dedicated to Jean-André Arbenson, and a kindergarten dedicated to Laurent-Samuel Henriod.

=== Sports Infrastructure ===
The town has a sports area multipurpose open on 3 May 2010, for the practice of Football 5, volleyball and tennis. In the municipal area is also a climbing wall.

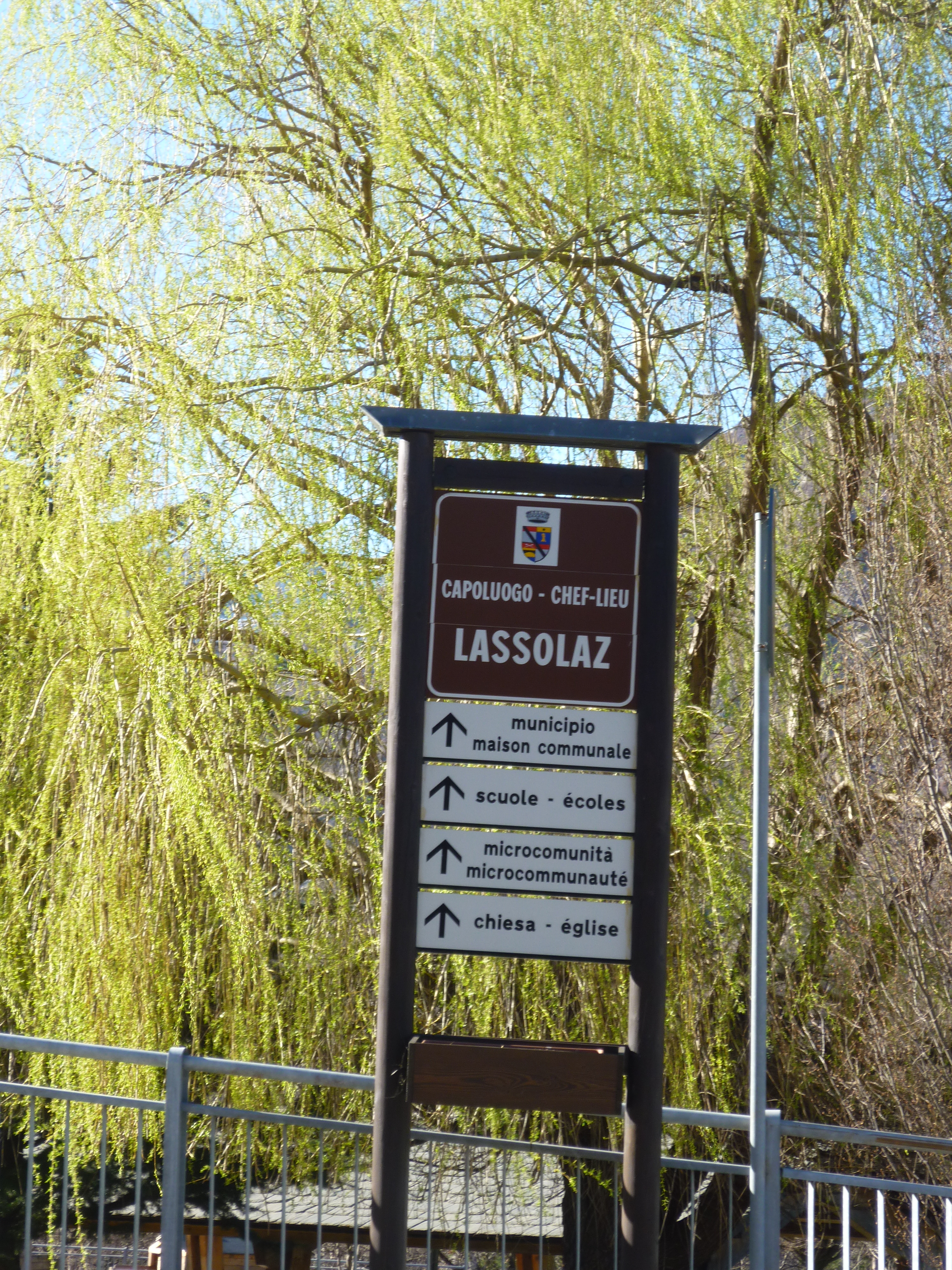
Bilingual road sign (Italian-French) in Lassolaz (chef-lieu).

=== Roads ===
The road network of the municipality is made up of the Regional Road 10 from east to west to the junction between the villages of Banchet and Valérod, located near the Chapel of the Holy Cross.

Pontey is connected with neighboring municipalities through two bridges on the Doire baltée: one to the National Road 26 (Turin – La Thuile), and the other with Châtillon passing near the Châtillon railway station.

== Administration ==
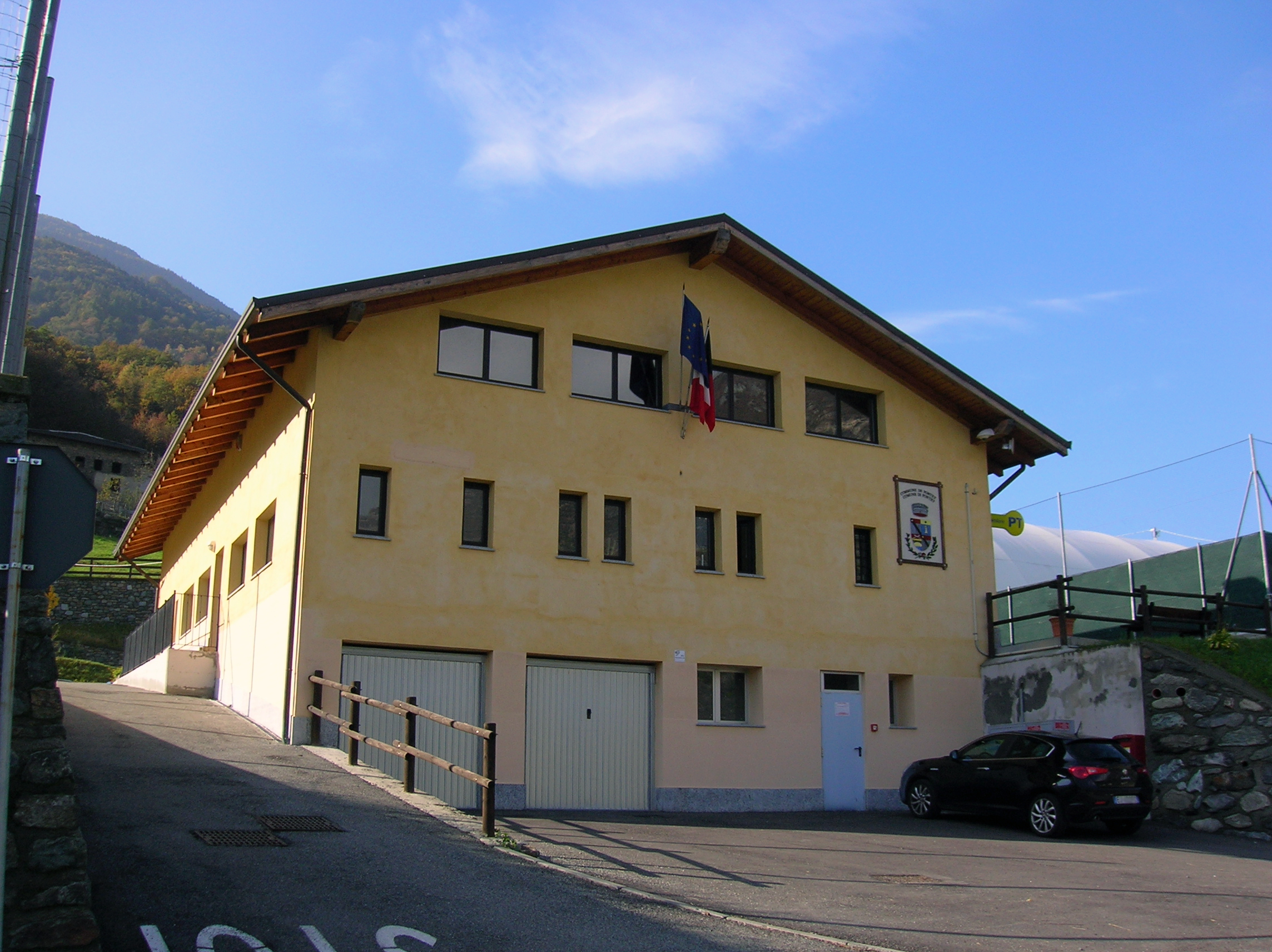
The Town Hall

It is part of the Unité des communes valdôtaines du mont-Cervin.

== Bibliography ==
- Fausta Baudin, Omar Borettaz, Rosella Obert, Pontey: storia e immagini di una comunità, Aosta: Tipografia valdostana, 2002
- Damien Daudry, Segnalazione e documentazione fotografica del villaggio protostorico della Cime Noire, in Bulletin d'études préhistoriques et archéologiques alpines, fascicolo 16, 2005, pp. 157–176
- Mario Catalano, Santuario astronomico delle ruote cosmiche in Valmérianaz, 2002
- Pierre Daudry, A proposito di pietre solari e di una strada lastricata sulle alture di Pontey, in Bulletin d'études préhistoriques alpines, fascicolo 2, 1969/1970, pp. 183–188

== See also ==
- Via Francigena
