= Lake Charey =

Lake of the Aosta Valley, Northern Italy

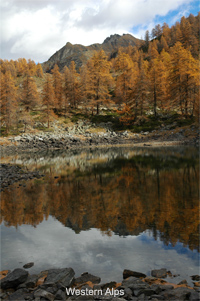
- Charey Lake in 2006

- Location within Aosta Valley
- Location: La Magdeleine, Aosta Valley
- Coordinates: 45°49′11.86″N 7°38′00.6″E
- Basin countries: Italy
- Surface elevation: 2,137 m (7,011 ft)

Lake Charey (Italian: Lago Charey, French: Lac de Charey) is an alpine lake located in La Magdeleine, Aosta Valley, Italy.

== Description ==
The lakes are located at about 2,137 m (7,011 ft) above sea level in a shady basin, surrounded by larch trees, close to the rugged northwestern slope of Mount Tantané. Nestled in an area with debris flows, it undergoes significant seasonal variations in water level.

The lakes can be reached with an easy walk, mainly on a dirt road, starting from an altitude of about 1,900 m (6,200 ft) from the road that connects La Magdeleine to the Col de la Pilaz mountain pass. The hike requires a gain of about 300 m (980 ft) in elevation (including any descent). The route then continues to the Champlong Lakes.
