= Saint Mary Magdalene church =

Santa Maria Maddalena
- Chiesa di Santa Maria Maddalena (Italian); Église Sainte-Marie-Madeleine (French)
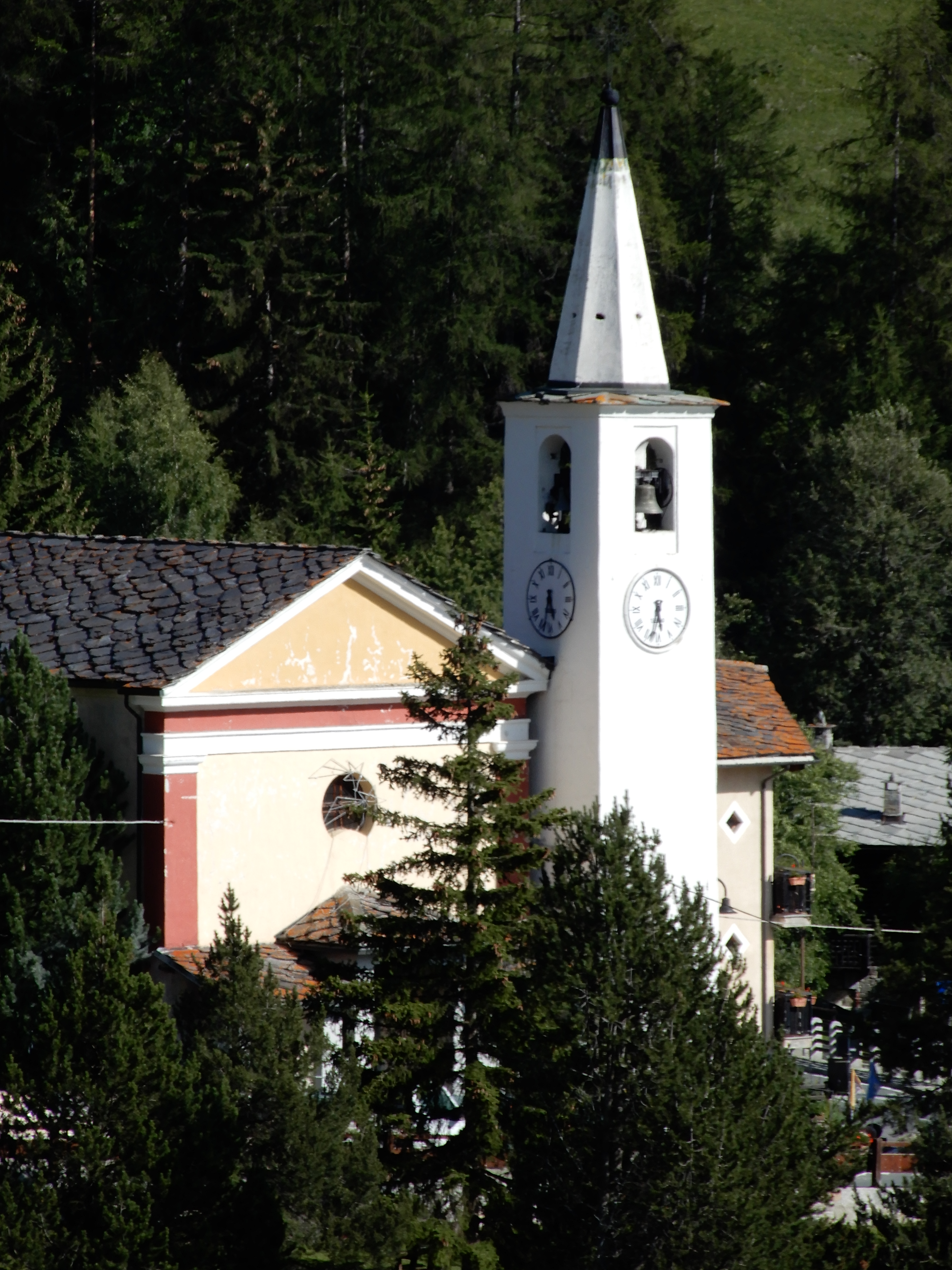
- Santa Maria Maddalena, La Magdeleine in 2021
- Click on the map for a fullscreen view
- 45°48′34.03″N 7°37′07.82″E
- Country: Italy
- Denomination: Roman Catholic

Architecture
- Functional status: Active

Administration
- Diocese: Diocese of Aosta

Santa Maria Maddalena is a Roman Catholic church located in La Magdeleine, Aosta Valley, Italy.

== History ==
The church was first built in 1482, when the inhabitants of Brengon and Clou decided to build a chapel dedicated to Mary Magdalene. The original structure, which was smaller than the current one, was later the subject of numerous interventions that changed its appearance over the centuries.

Between 1774 and 1776, the chapel was enlarged, taking on almost its current form. In 1789, it was elevated to the status of a parish church. Until then, this role had been fulfilled by the church of Antey-Saint-André, whose parish La Magdeleine was part of.

Important works were carried out by priests Joseph Grange and Marc Benchod between the end of the 18th and the beginning of the 19th centuries.

== Description ==
The church, located in the village of Brengon, has a single-nave plan. The main altar and the tabernacle, made of carved wood, probably date back to the late 18th century. The altar is surmounted by a large painting depicting the Virgin with the Child. Other paintings adorn the side altars.

The bell tower features a stone bearing the year 1841. To the right of it lies the old cemetery, where there is a stone cross with the inscription: "Ici reposent nos ancêtres" (in French, Here lie our ancestors).

== Gallery ==
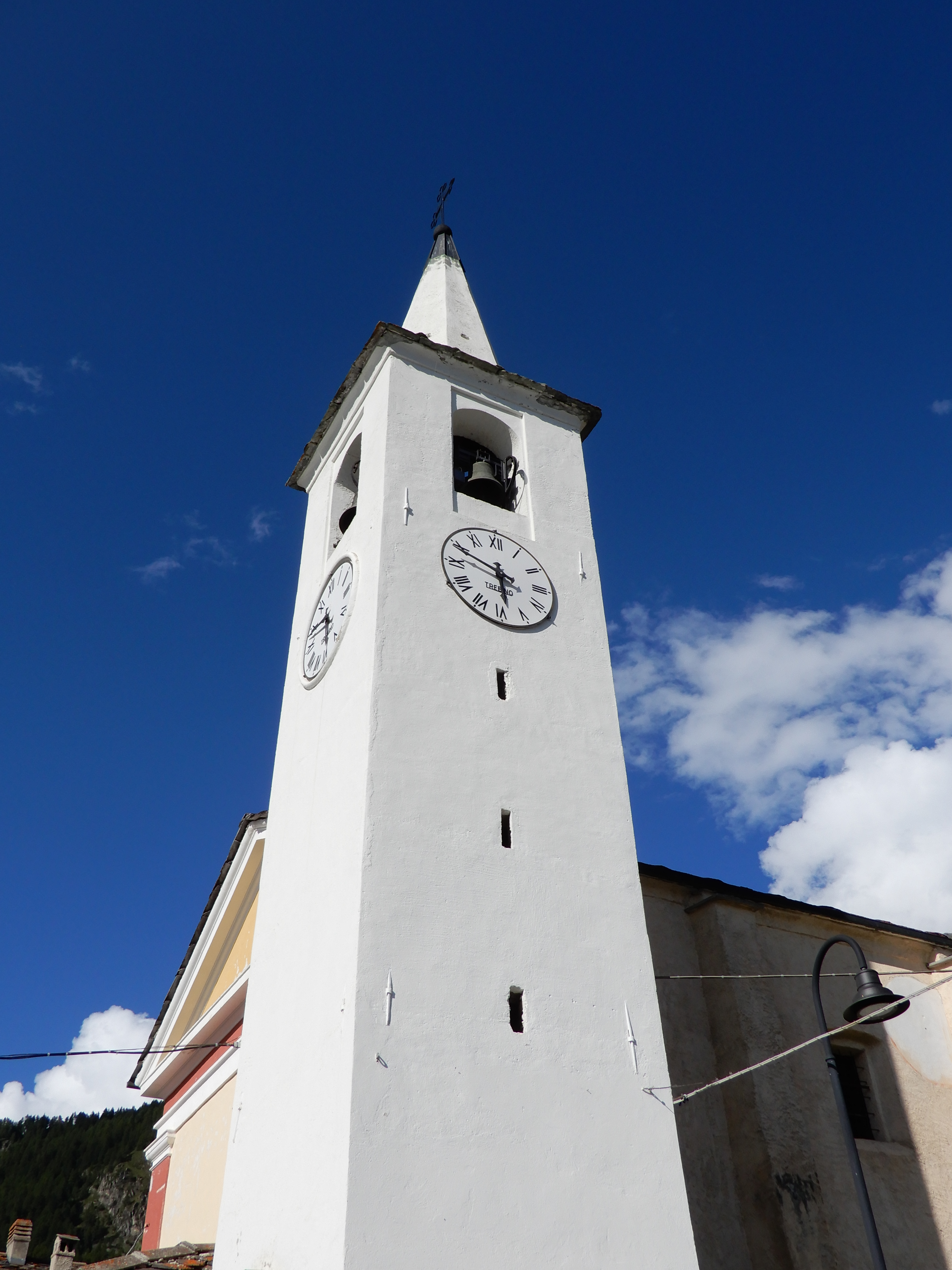

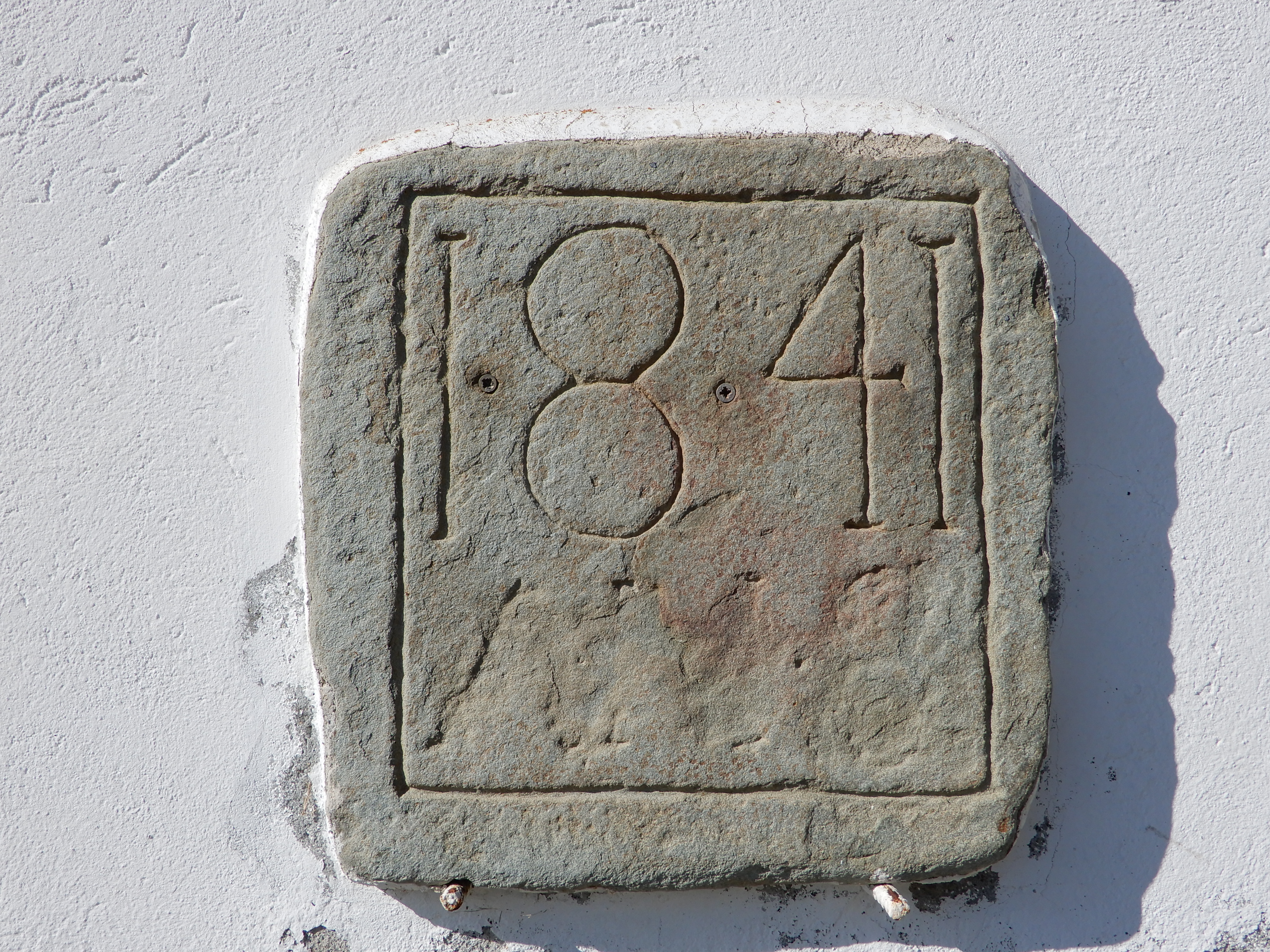

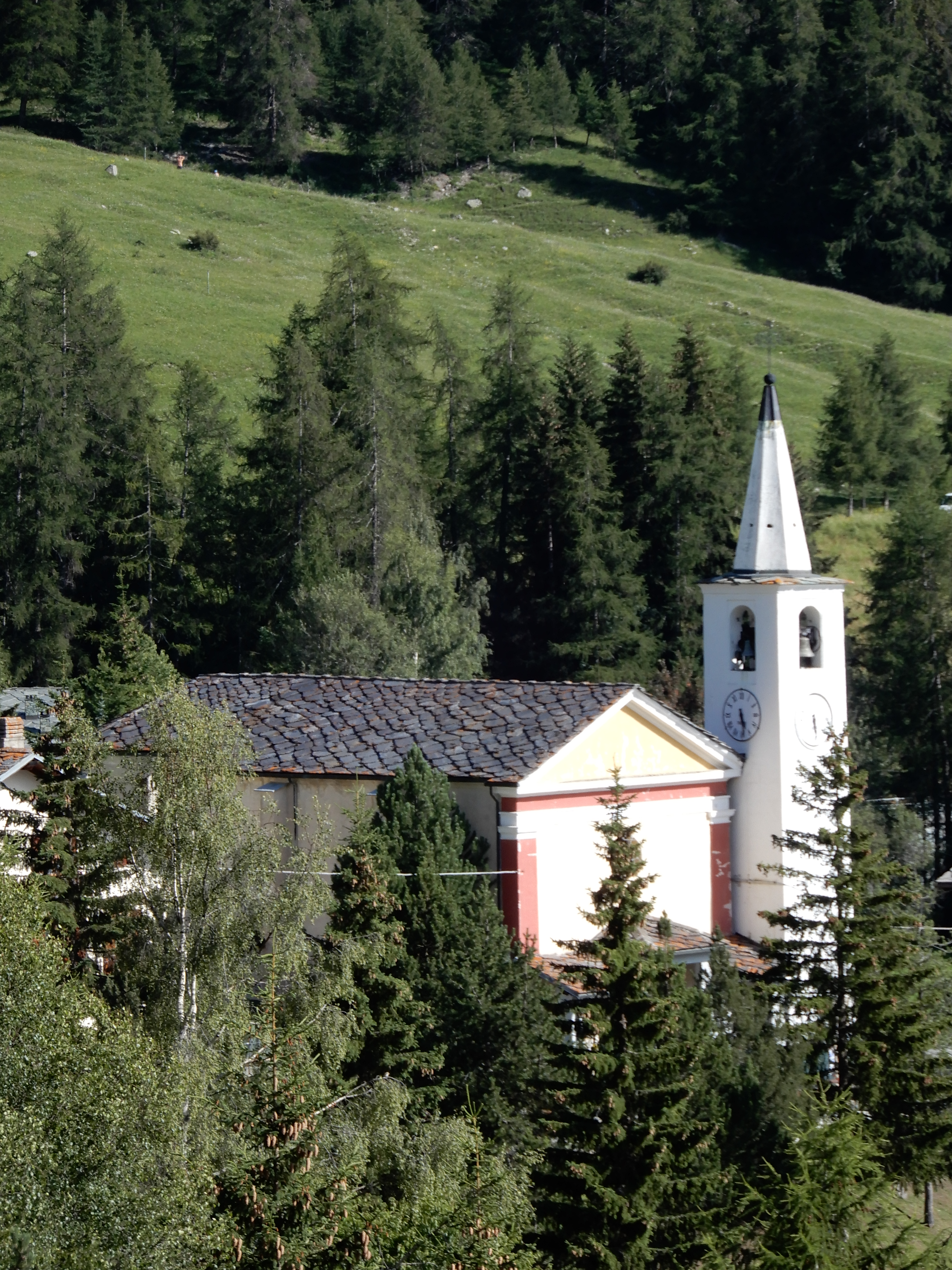
