= Cly Castle =

Castle in Saint-Denis, Aosta Valley

Cly castle
- Aosta Valley, Italy
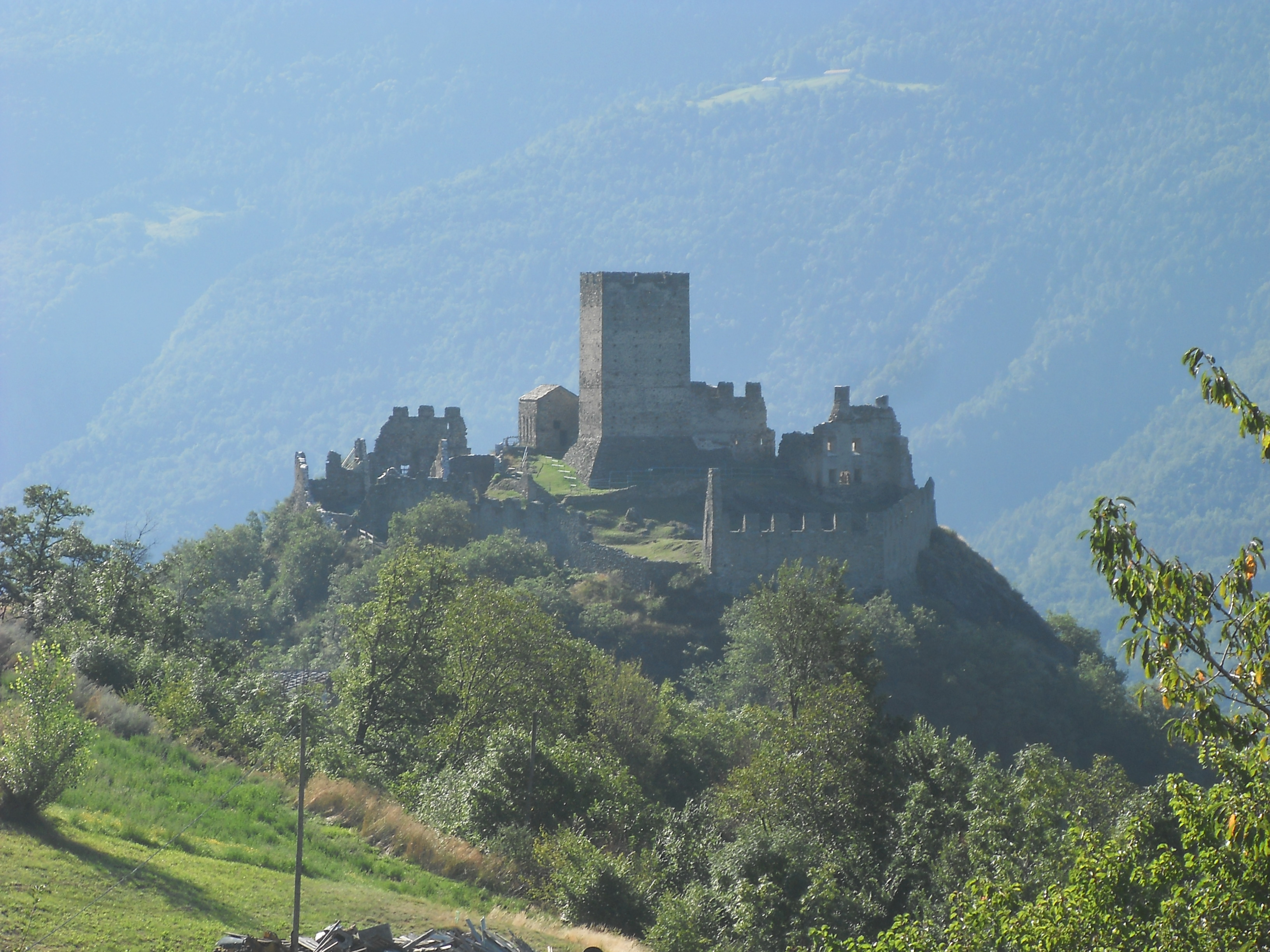
- Cly castle ruins

Site information
- Controlled by: Municipality of Saint-Denis

Location
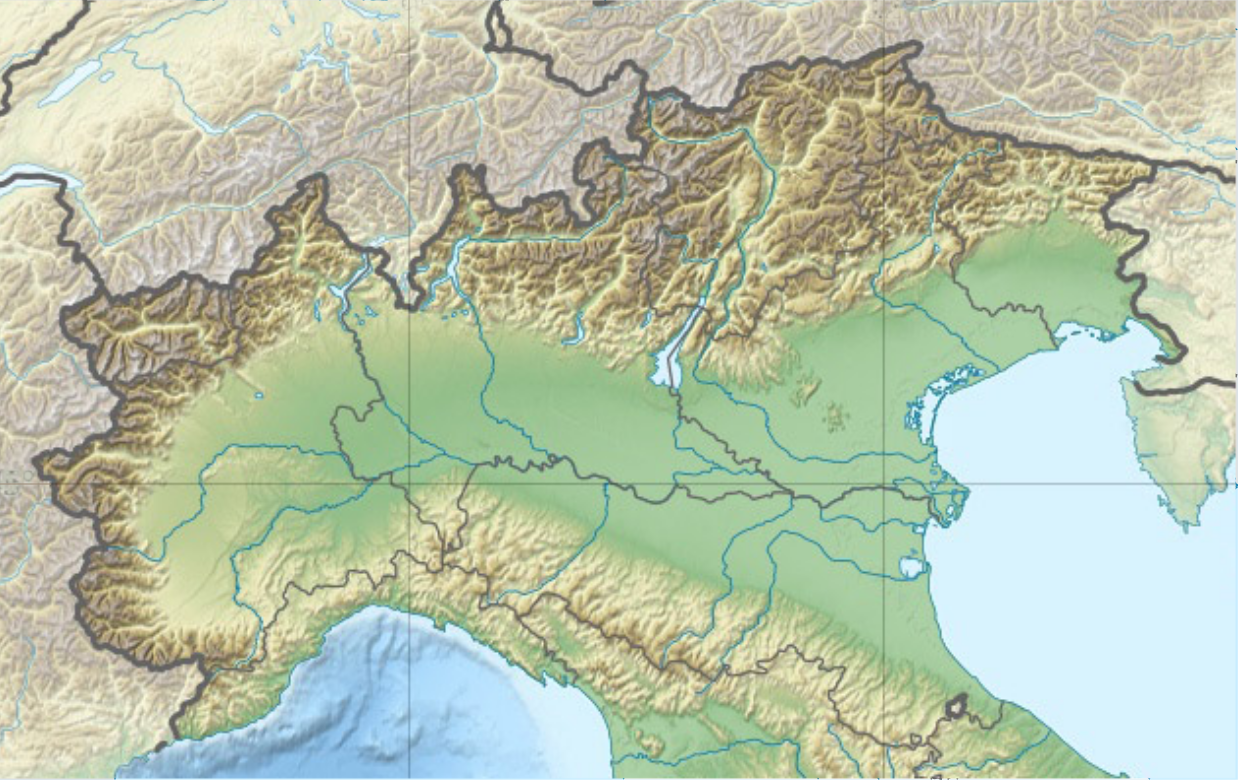
- Coordinates: 45°44′57″N 7°33′37″E
- Height: 2520 ft.

Site history
- Built: 1207
- Built by: Challant family

Cly is a castle in the Italian municipality of Saint-Denis, in Aosta Valley, northwest Italy. It belongs to the so-called primitive style of castle, consisting of a keep with a surrounding wall. The ruins rise from a bed of metamorphic rock, on the edge of a fault line which extends to the Quart Castle.

== History ==
Cly was first mentioned in a document from 1207, in which the "chapel sancti Mauricij (Saint Maurice) de castro Cliuo" is mentioned among the goods of the Vicarage of Saint-Gilles in Verrès, but the keep has been dated to 1027 using an analysis of the tree rings in its timbers (dendrochronology). Originally a fief held from the Counts of Savoy, in 1376 the direct ownership passed to the Duchy of Savoy, which installed a castellan to administer it for them until abandoned in 1550. The castle fell to ruins in the centuries that followed.

== The castle today ==
Eventually the castle ruins became the property of the nearby town of Saint-Denis. The castle is visible atop the hill overlooking Chambave.
