= Mont Avic =

Mountain in the Graian Alps, in the Aosta Valley, north-western Italy

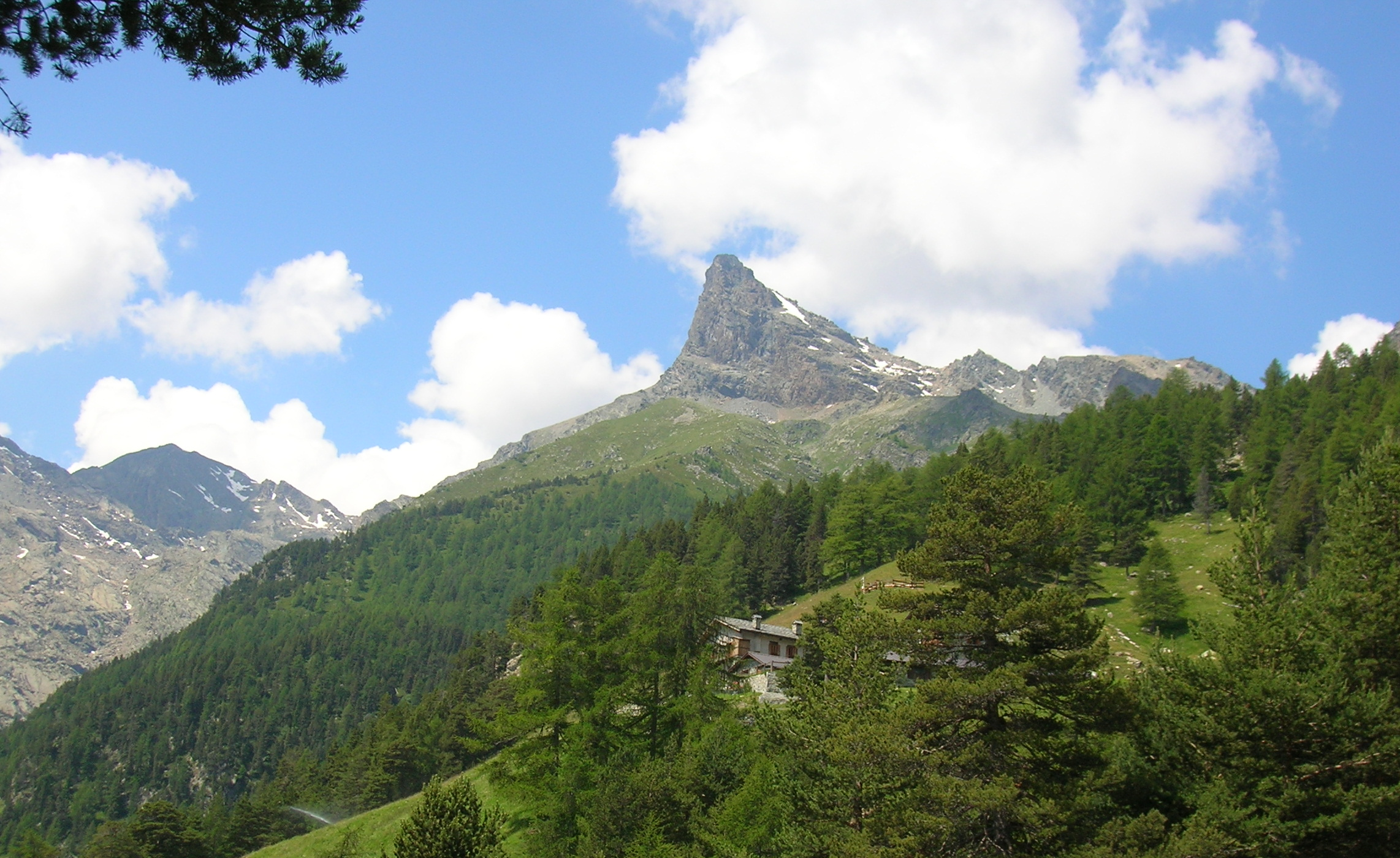

Highest point
- Elevation: 3,006 m (9,862 ft)
- Prominence: 395
- Isolation: 5.14 km (3.19 mi)
- Listing: Alpine mountains above 3000 m
- Coordinates: 45°41′24″N 7°33′50″E

Geography
- Location within Alps
- Location: Aosta Valley, Italy
- Parent range: Graian Alps

Mont Avic is a mountain in the Graian Alps, in the Aosta Valley, north-western Italy. It has an elevation of 3,006 m (9862 ft). It is included in the Gran Paradiso Massif.

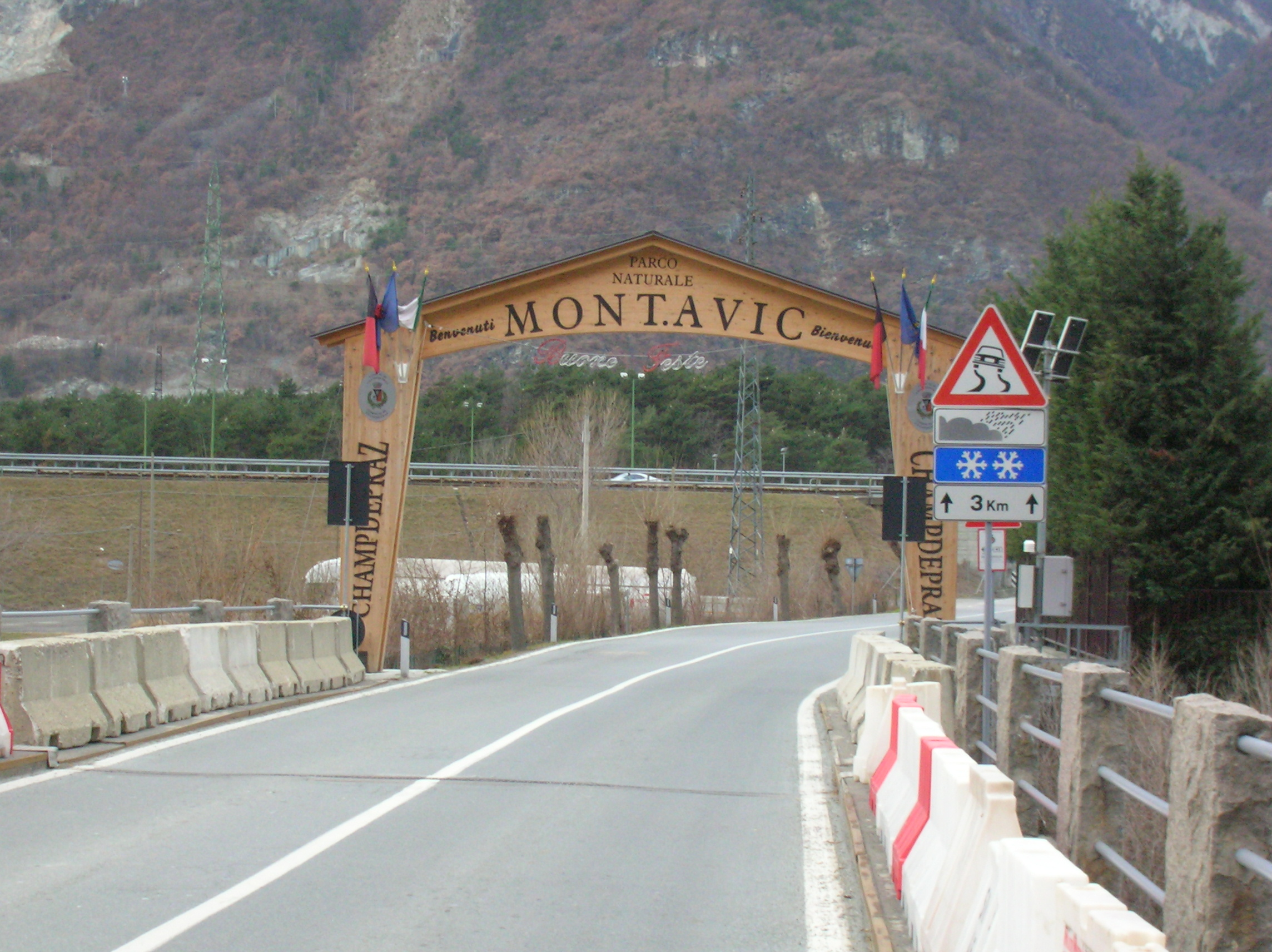
Entrance of the Mont-Avic Natural Park.

== Geography ==
The peak is located between the municipalities of Champdepraz, Chambave and Champorcher, and gives its name to a regional natural park called Mont Avic Natural Park.

Mont Avic was ascended for the first time in 1875. The easiest route starts from the Champdepraz valley; at first it follows well marked footpaths and then becomes steeper and more difficult.
