= Mount Tantané =

Mountain in Aosta Valley, Italy

- French: Mont Tantané; Italian: Monte Tantané
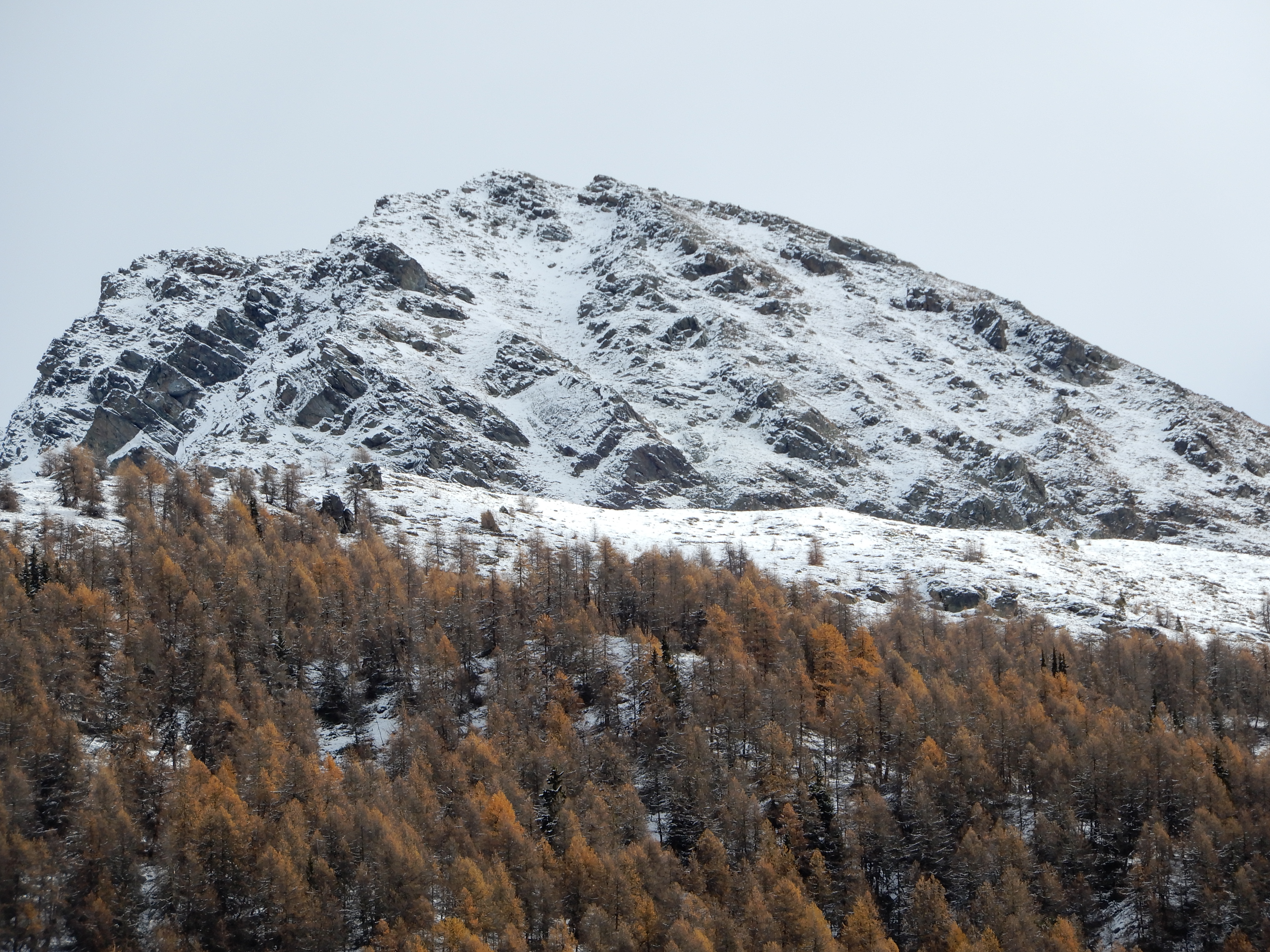
- Mount Tantané in 2017

Highest point
- Elevation: 2,734 m (8,970 ft)
- Prominence: 122 m (400 ft)
- Listing: Mountains of Italy
- Coordinates: 45°49′00.34″N 07°38′49.31″E

Geography
- Location within Alps Location within Italy
- Location: Aosta Valley, Italy
- Parent range: Pennine Alps

Climbing
- Easiest route: Hike

Mount Tantané (French pronunciation: [tɑ̃tane]; French: Mont Tantané, Italian: Monte Tantané) is a 2734 metre high mountain of the Pennine Alps, in the municipality of La Magdeleine, in Aosta Valley, Italy. It lies between the Ayas Valley to the east and the Valtournenche to the west.

At the foot of the summit pyramid of the mountain lie the remains of an ancient neolithic settlement, inhabited by the Salassi tribe.

== Gallery ==
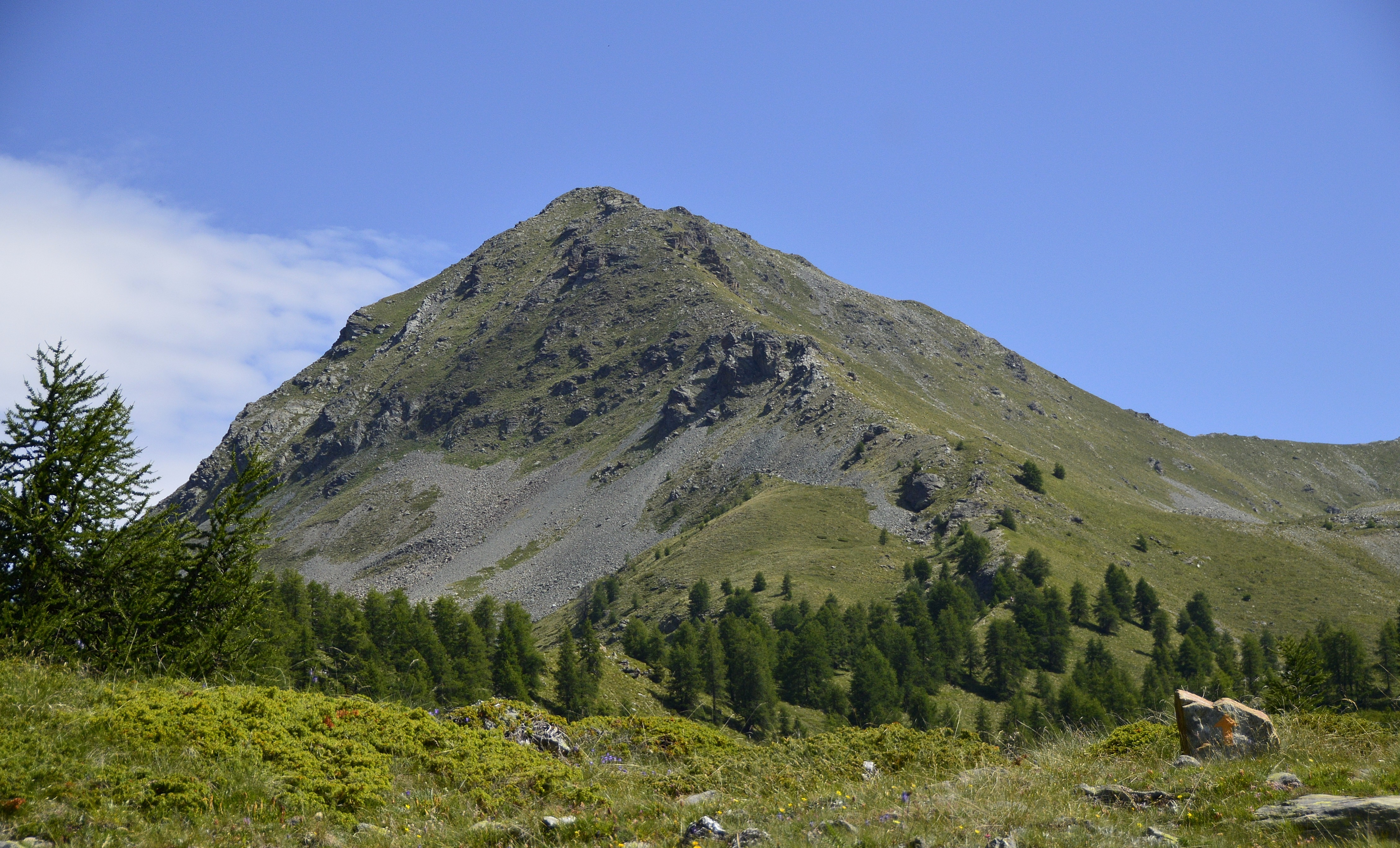

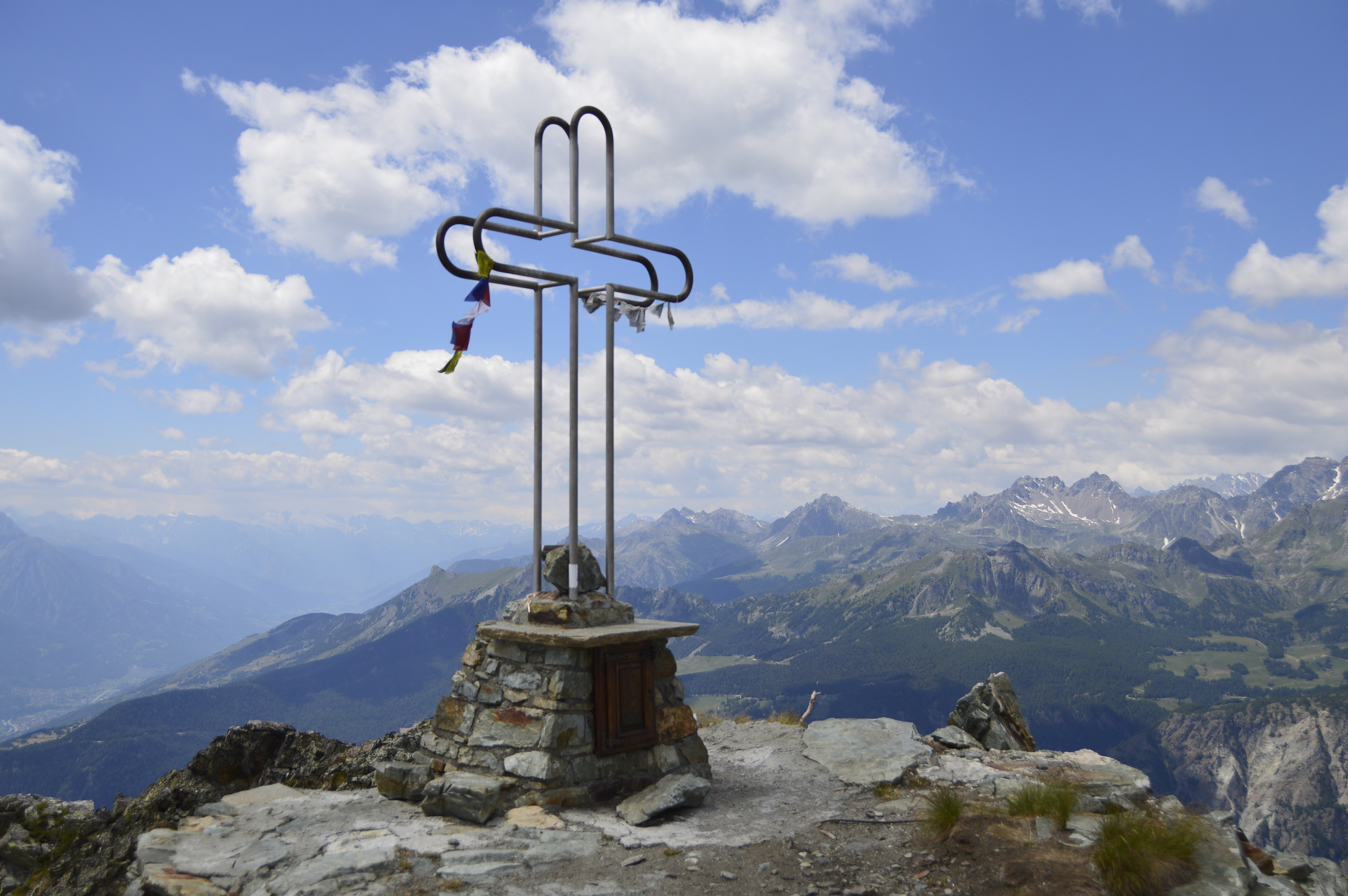

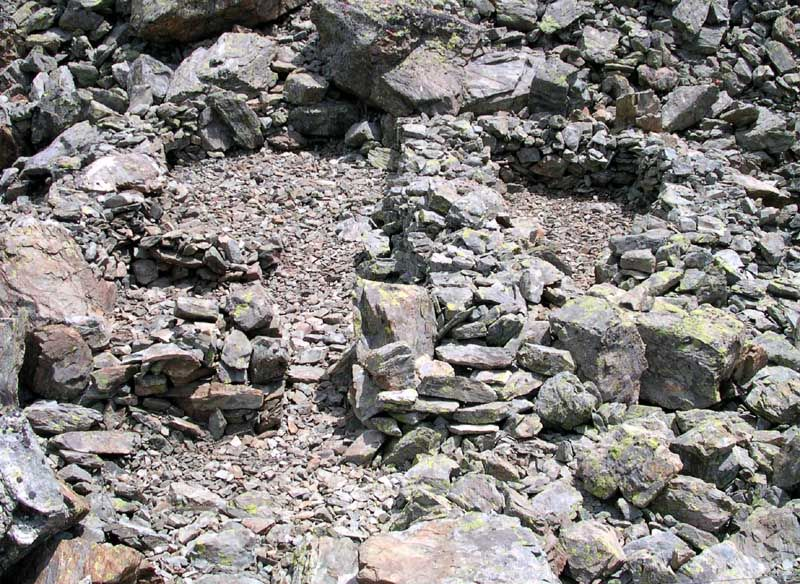

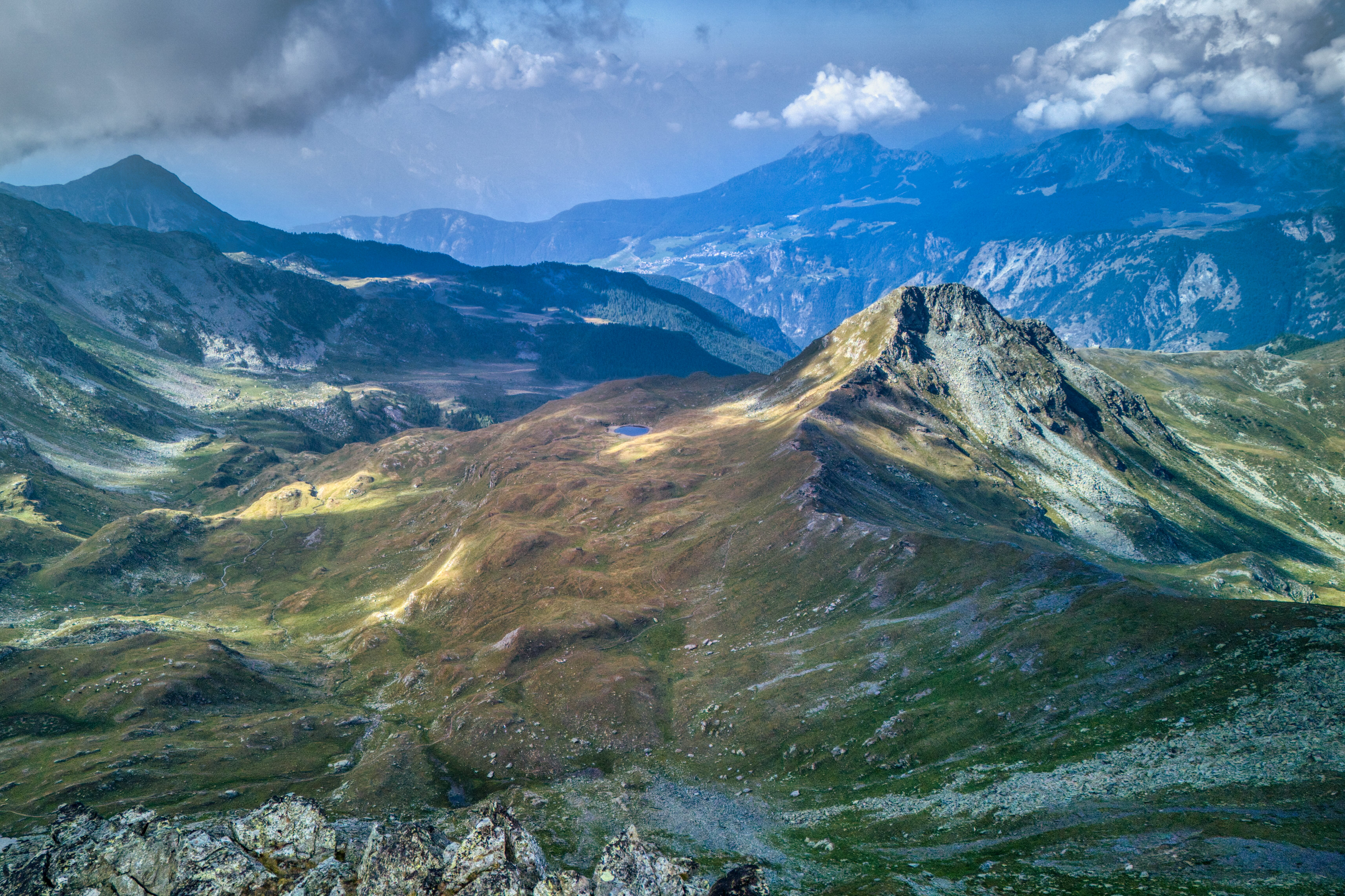
View of Mount Tantané (on the left) from Becca Trecare. On the right, the Punta Falinère and the Falinère lake
