= Saint-Denis, Aosta Valley =

Saint-Denis Sen-Din-ì (Valdôtain)
- Comune
- Comune di Saint-Denis; Commune de Saint-Denis
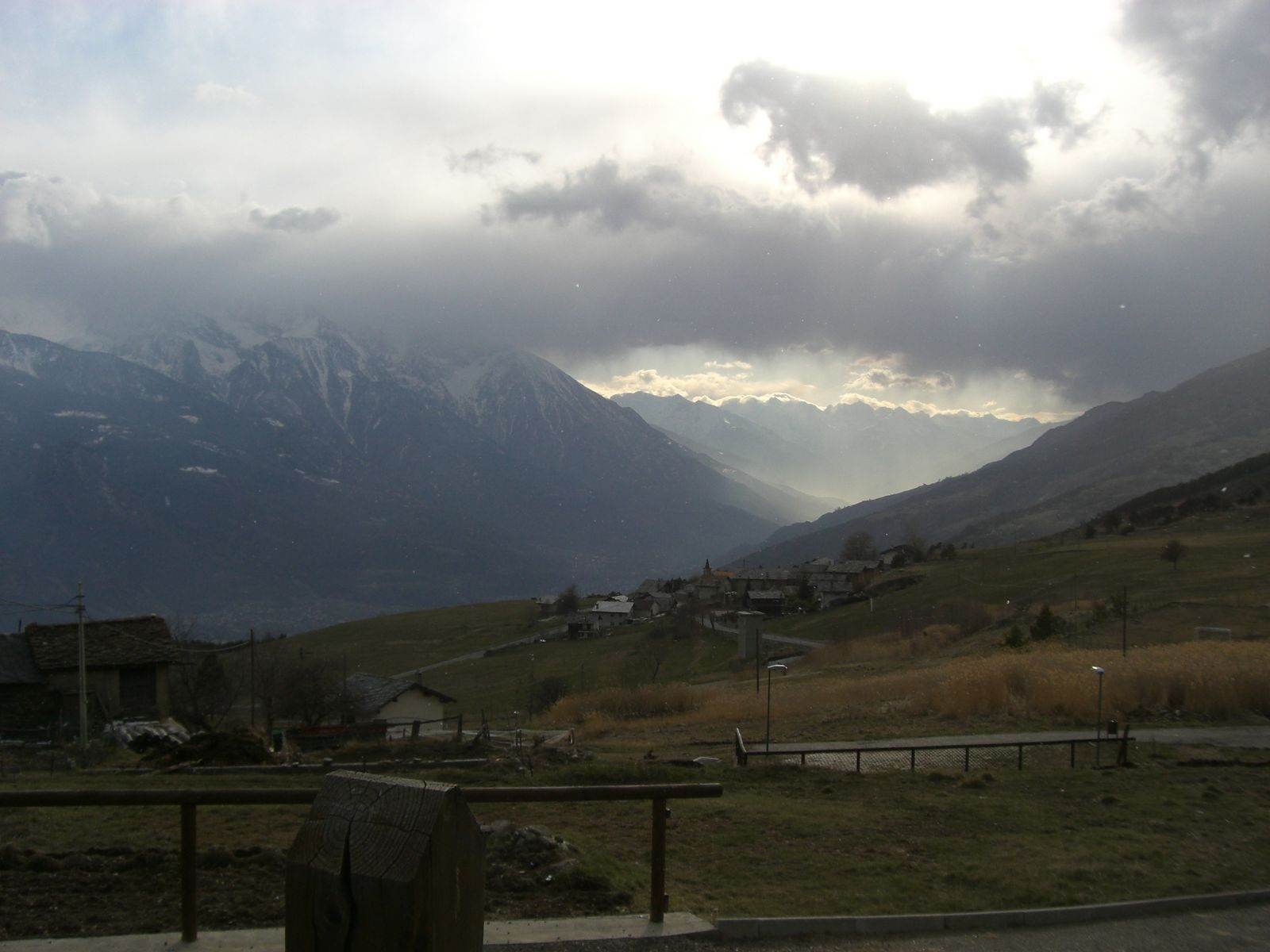
- View of Saint-Denis municipality as seen from the village of Plau. Aosta can be seen in the background.

- Location within Italy Location within Aosta Valley
- Coordinates: 45°45′N 7°33′E
- Country: Italy
- Region: Aosta Valley
- Province: none
- Frazioni: Barmaz, Bédeugaz, Blavesse, Celliers-Neufs, Champillon, Chouac, Cly, Cret-de-Gilles, Cuignon, Del, Étrobléyaz, Farys, Fosses, Goillaz-dessous, Goillaz-dessus, Gottroisa, Grand Bruson, Grenella, Grossa-Golliana, Gubioche, Maisoncle, Moral, Orsières, Pecca, Petit Bruson, Plantéry, Plau, Polalonge, Raffort, Roteus, Rovarey, Semon, Sessina, Saint-Évence, Vieille

Area
  - Total: 11 km^{2} (4.2 sq mi)
- Elevation: 820 m (2,690 ft)

Population (31 December 2022)
  - Total: 359
  - Density: 33/km^{2} (85/sq mi)
- Demonym: Saint-denisots
- Time zone: UTC+1 (CET)
  - Summer (DST): UTC+2 (CEST)
- Postal code: 11023
- Dialing code: 0166
- ISTAT code: 7059
- Patron saint: Saint Denis of Paris
- Saint day: 9 October
- Website: Official website

Saint-Denis (French: [sɛ̃ dəni]; Valdôtain: Sen-Din-ì) is a town and comune in the Aosta Valley region of north-western Italy near the ruins of Cly castle.
