= Champdepraz =

Champdepraz Tsandeprà (Arpitan)
- Comune
- Comune di Champdepraz; Commune de Champdepraz
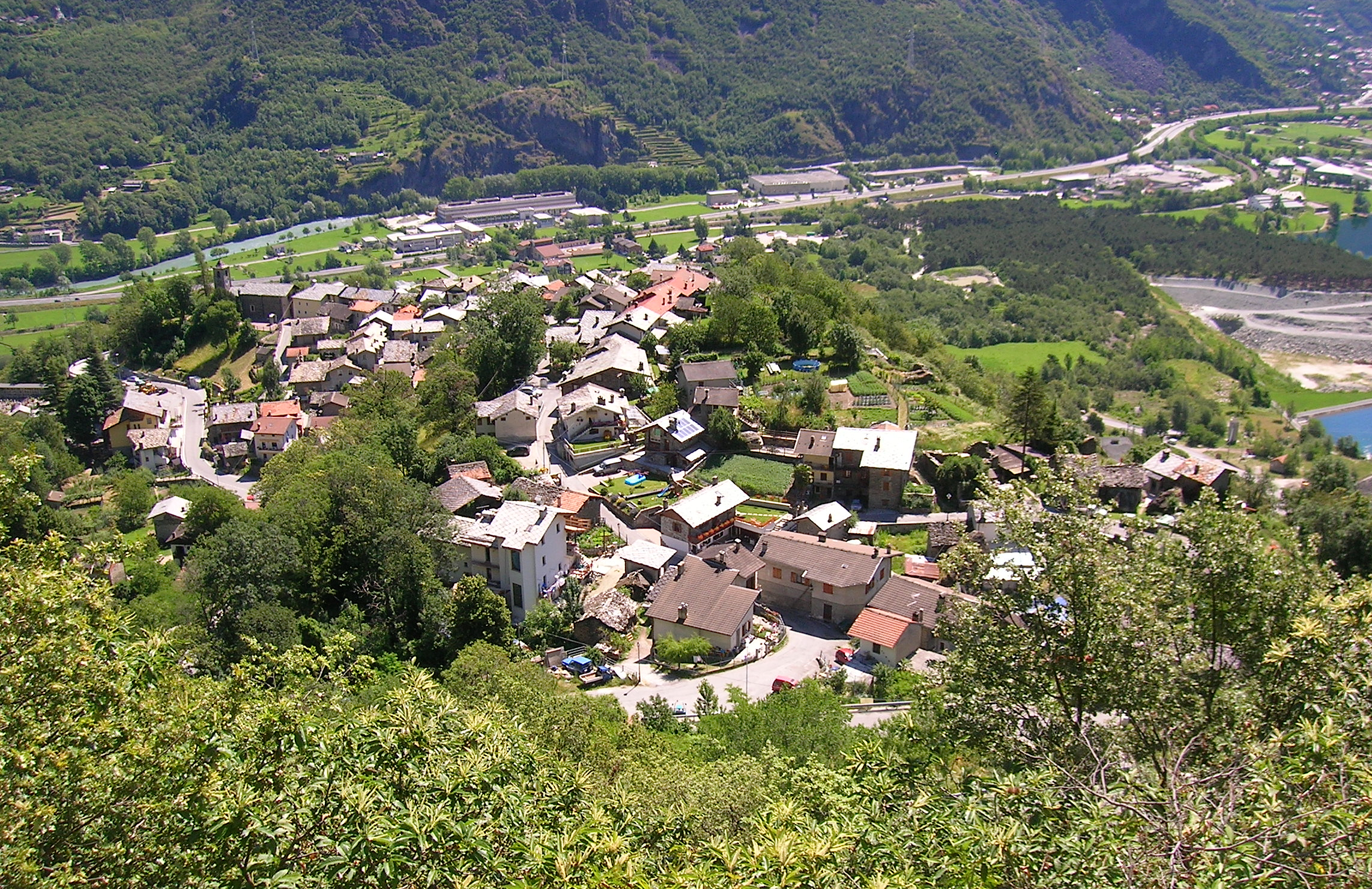

- Coat of arms

- Location of the comune within the Aosta Valley

- Location within Italy Location within Aosta Valley
- Coordinates: 45°41′N 7°39′E
- Country: Italy
- Region: Aosta Valley
- Frazioni: Barbustel, Blanchet, Boden, Capiron, Chef-lieu, Chantonnet, Covarey, Crestaz, Le Cugnon, Dialley, La Fabrique, Fussy (Füsse), Gettaz-des-Allemands, Hérin, La Ville (La Veulla), Les Sales, Losson, Viéring

Government
  - Mayor: Monica Crétier

Area
  - Total: 48 km^{2} (19 sq mi)
- Elevation: 523 m (1,716 ft)

Population (31 December 2022)
  - Total: 729
  - Density: 15/km^{2} (39/sq mi)
- Demonym: Champdeprasiens
- Time zone: UTC+1 (CET)
  - Summer (DST): UTC+2 (CEST)
- Postal code: 11020
- Dialing code: 0125
- Patron saint: Saint Francis of Sales
- Saint day: 24 January

Champdepraz (French: [ʃɑ̃dəpʁa], Arpitan: Tsandeprà, lit. 'field of meadows') is a town and comune in the Aosta Valley region of northwestern Italy.

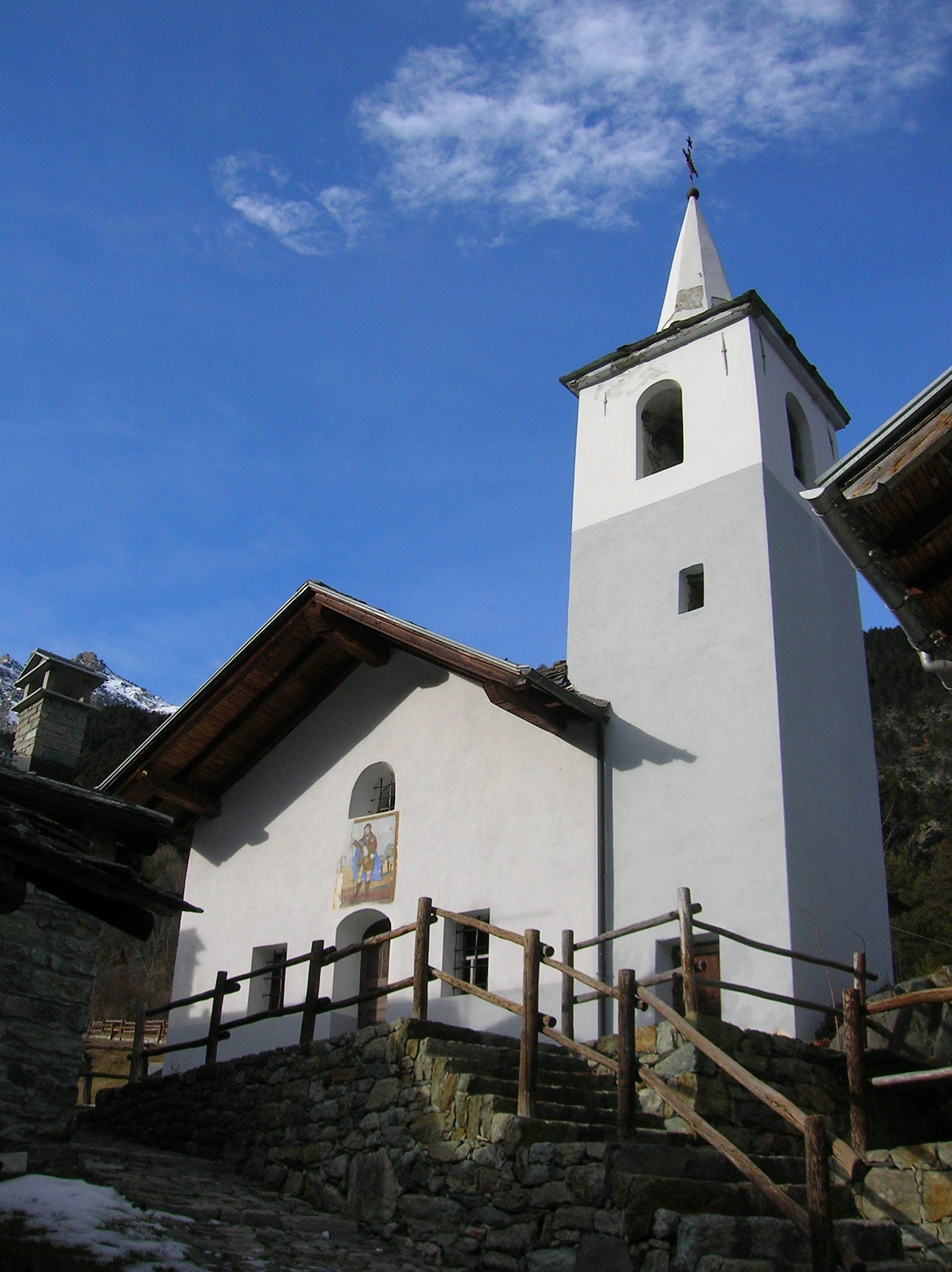
St Francis de Sales parish church in La Ville.

== Geography ==
The town is situated in the Champdepraz valley, a lateral valley of the Aosta Valley.

The hydroelectric power station of Champdepraz is using the power of the water from Chalamy stream to generate electricity. The headquarter of the Mont Avic Natural Park, founded in 1989, is also located in this municipality.

== See also ==
- Mont Avic
