= Valtournenche (valley) =

Coordinates: 45°51′06″N 7°36′21″E

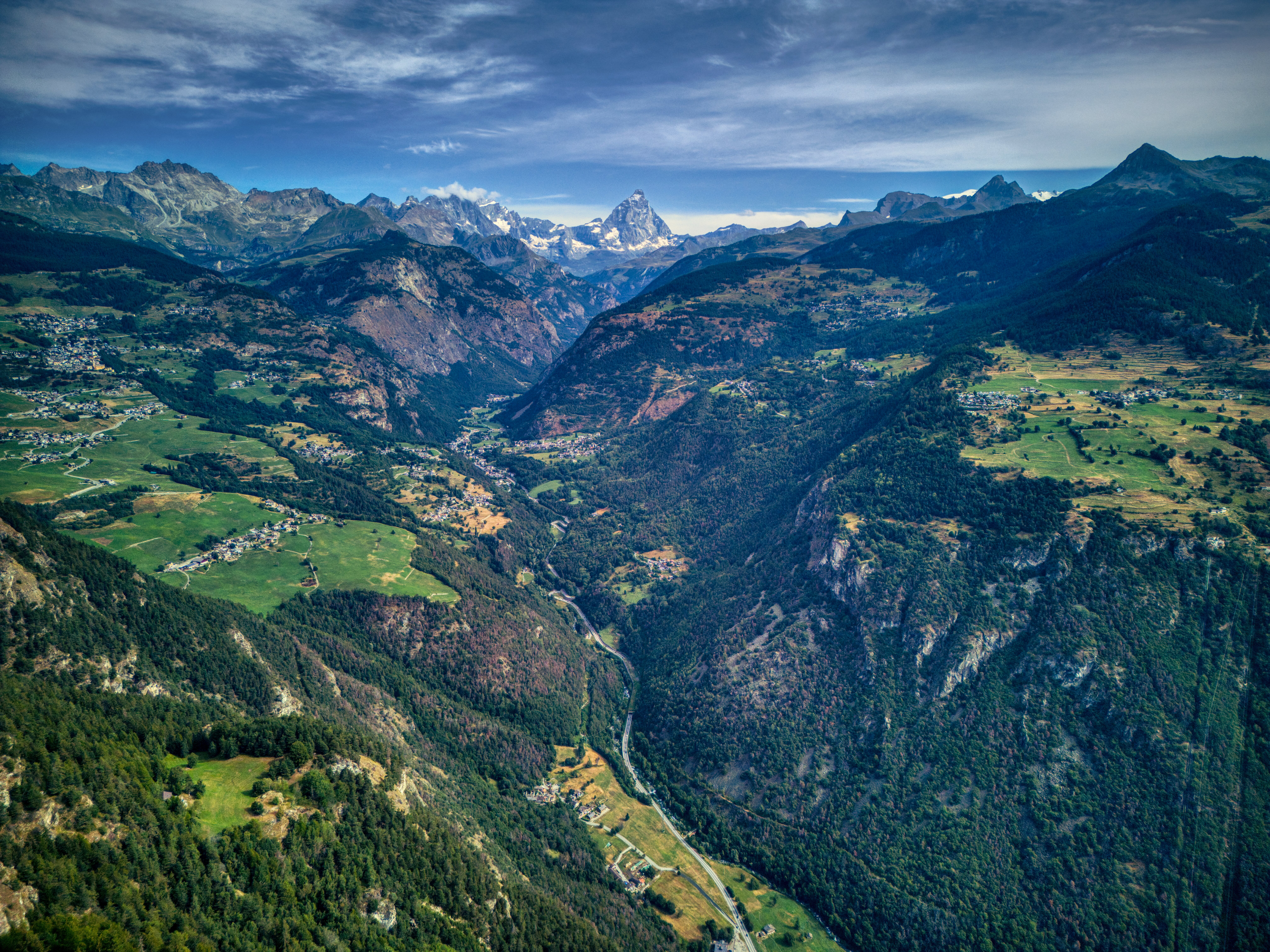
The Valtournenche with the Matterhorn

The Valtournenche is a side valley of the Aosta Valley in northern Italy. It is dominated at its head by the Matterhorn (4,478 m, 14,692 ft) and is known for its ski resorts.

== Name ==
The French form Valtournenche is thought to derive from the Latin name Valle Tornina, attested in a papal bull issued by Pope Alexander III, in which he placed the Diocese of Aosta, and consequently the communities of the Valtournenche, under his protection. The name Valle Tornina, like the name of the village of Torgnon, derives from the term Tor, meaning "mountain", possibly in reference to the Matterhorn, which dominates the valley. Vótornéntse is the place name in the local Franco-Provençal dialect, while the Italianized form Valtornenza was used during the Fascist period. The homophonic spelling Valtournanche was in use from 1946 to 1976.

== Geography ==
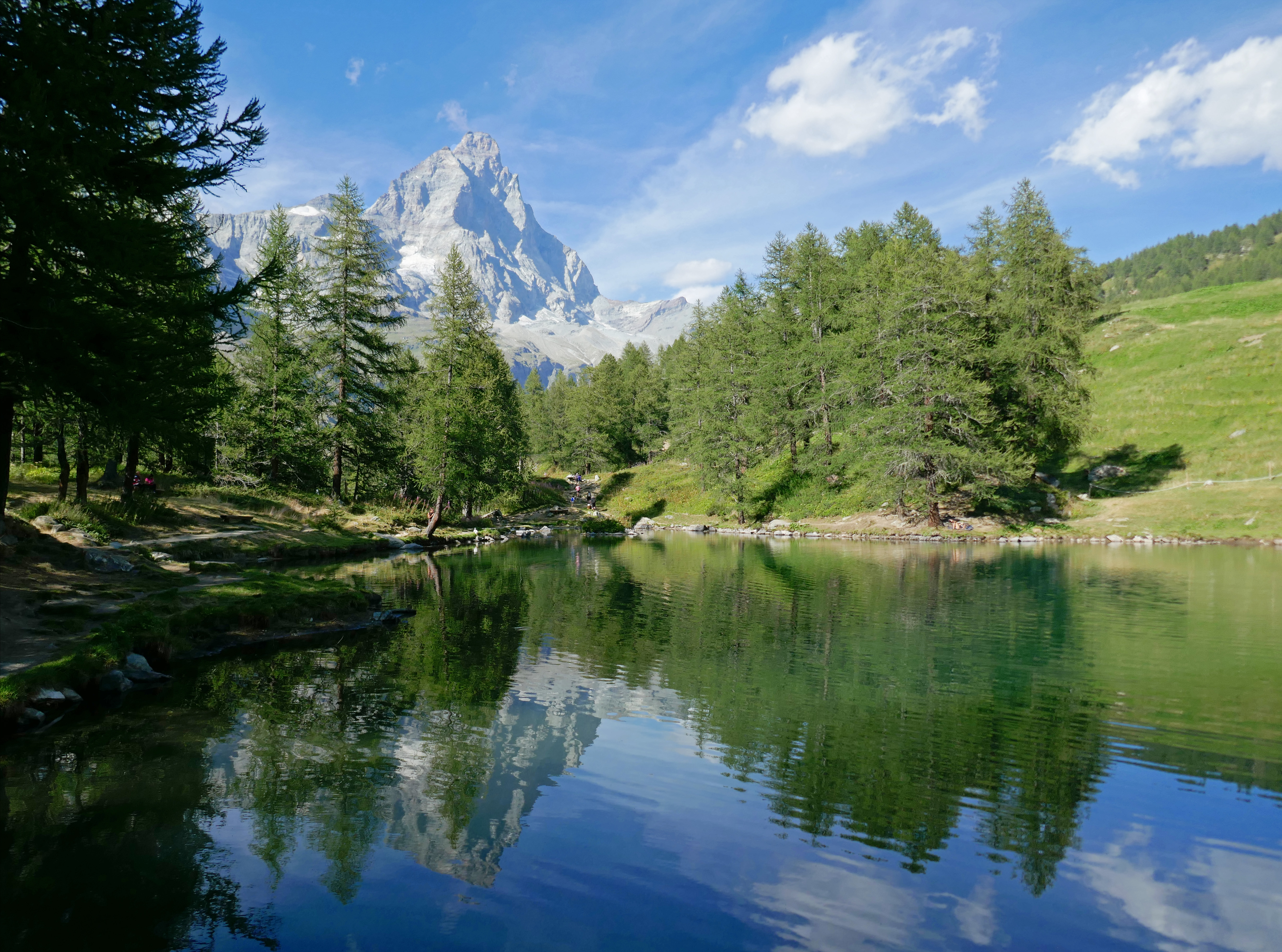
The Blue Lake near Cervinia

The valley lies on the left orographic side of the Dora Baltea, the main river of the Aosta Valley. It extends for approximately 25 km (16 mi) from Châtillon in the south to the ski resort of Cervinia at its head, at the foot of the Matterhorn, the valley's highest peak, on the border with Switzerland. The valley is drained by the Marmore stream, which flows along its length, passes through the Gouffre des Busserailles, and eventually joins the Dora Baltea near Châtillon.

The valley is flanked by two mountain ridges featuring several prominent summits. Along the western ridge are the Dent d'Hérens, the peaks of the Grandes Murailles and Petites Murailles, Château des Dames, Punta Tsan, Mount Meabé, and Becca d'Aver. The eastern ridge includes Testa Grigia, Gobba di Rollin, Grand Tournalin, Becca di Nana, Mount Tantané, and Mount Zerbion. To the north, the valley borders the Swiss canton of Valais, while the Ayas Valley lies to the east. To the south there is the main Aosta Valley and to the west the Valpelline and the Saint-Barthélemy Valley. The Theodul Pass, at an elevation of 3,295 m (10,810 ft), provides a route across the northern Alps to the neighbouring Mattertal in Switzerland.

The main lakes located in the valley are Lake Goillet, Lake Cignana, and Lake Lod. The smaller Blue Lake is also famous for its views on the Mattterhorn.

Administratively, the valley comprises five comuni, listed from south to north: Antey-Saint-André, Torgnon, La Magdeleine, Chamois, and Valtournenche.
