= Borna di Ciove =

Karst cave in Torgnon, Aosta Valley, Italy

- Borna di Ciove in the summer season

- Location within Italy
- Location: Torgnon, Italy
- Coordinates: 45°51′46″N 7°32′17″E
- Access: Public

Borna di Ciove is a karst cave located in the municipality of Torgnon, in the Aosta Valley, Italy.

== Name ==
The cave's name can be translated from the local Franco-Provençal patois as "Hole of the Choughs", referring to the choughs that are said to enter the cave for shelter during the summer.

== Description ==
The cave's entrance is located at an elevation of approximately 2,540 m (8,330 ft) above sea level, at the foot of Cima Bianca. The cave forms a natural sinkhole into which the waters of the stream flowing from the Colle di Chavacour basin disappear.

The cave has a total length of approximately 200 m (660 ft) and a vertical depth of 47 m (154 ft).

== Conservation ==
The cave lies within the Special Area of Conservation (SAC) Ambienti calcarei d'alta quota attorno al Lago Tsan (code IT1205081).

== See also ==
- List of caves in Italy
