= Punta Tsan =

Mountain in Italy

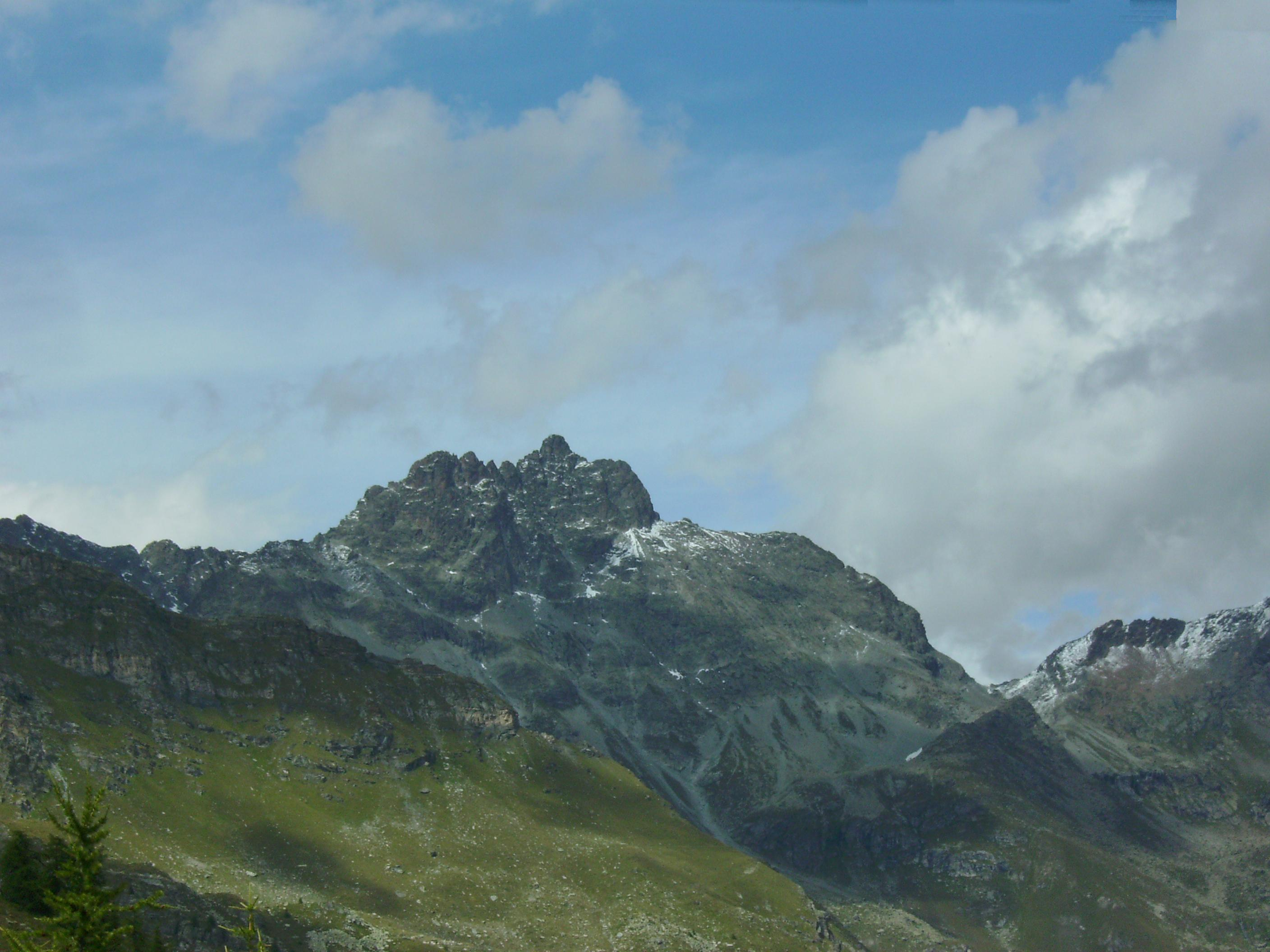
- South face of Punta Tsan

Highest point
- Elevation: 3,322 m (10,899 ft)
- Coordinates: 45°52′35″N 7°33′02″E

Geography
- Location within Alps
- Location: Aosta Valley, Italy

Punta Tsan (also spelled Punta Cian; French: Pointe du Tsan) is a 3,322 m (10,899 ft) tall mountain of the Pennine Alps in northern Italy. Its summit lies in the municipality of Torgnon in the Aosta Valley, Italy.

== Name ==
The term Tsan, Italianised in spelling as Cian, means "field" in the local Franco-Provençal dialect (cf. French champ).

== Description ==
Punta Tsan rises as a spur from the main ridge dividing the Valtournenche to the east from the Valpelline to the west. The summit lies on the Valtournenche side of the ridge, from which it is separated by the Col du Tsan. Its distinctive, steep pinnacle is particularly prominent when viewed from Torgnon on the Valtournenche side.

== Ascent ==
The ascent to the summit usually starts from Château, a hamlet of Torgnon, and passes through the Bivacco Rivolta. From the bivouac, the path climbs up along the east ridge, which leads to the summit by way of exposed rocky sections.

== SOIUSA classification ==
According to the SOIUSA (International Standardized Mountain Subdivision of the Alps) the mountain can be classified in the following way:

- main part = Western Alps
- major sector = North Western Alps
- section = Pennine Alps
- subsection = Alpi del Weisshorn e del Cervino
- supergroup = Catena Luseney-Cian
- group = Gruppo Cian-Redessau-Cima Bianca
