= Cima Bianca, Italy =

Mountain in Italy

Cima Bianca
- The north face of Cima Bianca

Highest point
- Elevation: 3,008 m (9,869 ft)
- Coordinates: 45°51′11″N 7°31′56″E

Geography
- Location within Alps
- Location: Aosta Valley, Italy

Cima Bianca is a 3,008 m (9,869 ft) tall mountain of the Pennine Alps in northern Italy. Its summit lies on the boundary between the municipalities of Torgnon and Nus in the Aosta Valley, Italy.

== Description ==
Cima Bianca lies along a south-north ridge that separates the Valtournenche to the east from the Saint-Barthélemy Valley to the west and which stretches from the north from the southern summit of Mount Redessau (3,237 m, 10,620 ft), from which Cima Bianca is separated by the Fenêtre de Tsan. South of Cima Bianca, the ridge continues towards Mount Meabé (2,615 m, 8,579 ft) and Becca d'Aver (2,469 m, 8,100 ft) before descending towards the central valley of the Aosta Valley. Cima Bianca is the highest summit of the ridge section between the Fenêtre de Tsan and the central valley.

The mountain is characterized by gentler, grassy slopes on its southern side and steeper, rocky faces to the north.

== Ascent ==
The ascent to the summit usually starts from the hamlet of Chantorné, above Torgnon, and passes through Crotte de Loup and reaches a junction at about 2,130 m (6,990 ft) of elevation, where the Cima Bianca route branches off from the path towards the Tsan bivouac.

A second approach comes from the Saint-Barthélemy Valley, from the hamlet of Praz.

== SOIUSA classification ==
According to the SOIUSA (International Standardized Mountain Subdivision of the Alps) the mountain can be classified in the following way:

- main part = Western Alps
- major sector = North Western Alps
- section = Pennine Alps
- subsection = Alpi del Weisshorn e del Cervino
- supergroup = Catena Luseney-Cian
- group = Gruppo Cian-Redessau-Cima Bianca
