= Buisson-Chamois Cable Car =

Cable car in Aosta Valley, Italy

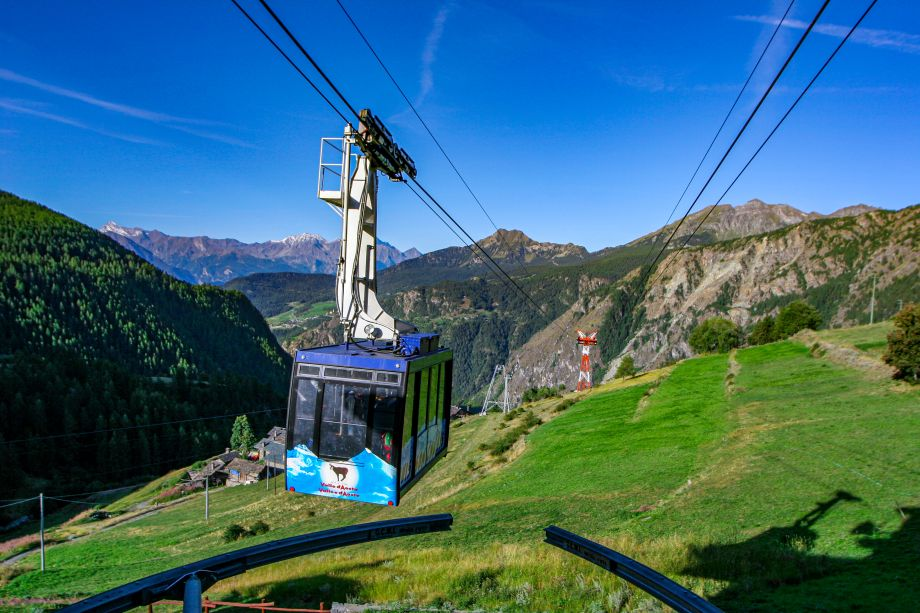
- Buisson-Chamois Cable Car in 2023
- Interactive map of Buisson-Chamois Cable Car

Overview
- Status: Operational
- Country: Italy
- Coordinates: 45.83247°N 7.601261°E
- Termini: Buisson, Antey-Saint-André; Chamois
- Open: 1955

Technical features
- Line length: 1,492 m (4,895 ft)
- Vertical Interval: 685 m (2,247 ft)

The Buisson-Chamois Cable Car (Italian: Funivia Buisson-Chamois, French: Téléphérique Buisson-Chamois) is an aerial lift that connects the hamlet of Buisson, in the municipality of Antey-Saint-André, with the municipality of Chamois, in the Aosta Valley, Italy. The cable car is the main means of transport to Chamois, as there are no roads accessible to motor vehicles connecting the village with the valley floor.

== History ==
The original cable car was built in 1955, providing a much faster connection between Chamois and the Valtournenche valley floor. Before then, Chamois could only be reached via a series of footpaths and mule tracks running from Nuarsaz to Corgnolaz, the main village of Chamois.

== Description ==
The cable car is 1,492 m (4,895 ft) long and connects the Buisson station, located at approximately 1,126 m (3,694 ft) above sea level, with the Chamois station, at approximately 1,811 m (5,942 ft) above sea level. It therefore overcomes a vertical difference of around 685 m (2,247 ft).
