= Becca di Nana =

Mountain in Italy

- French: Bec de Nannaz
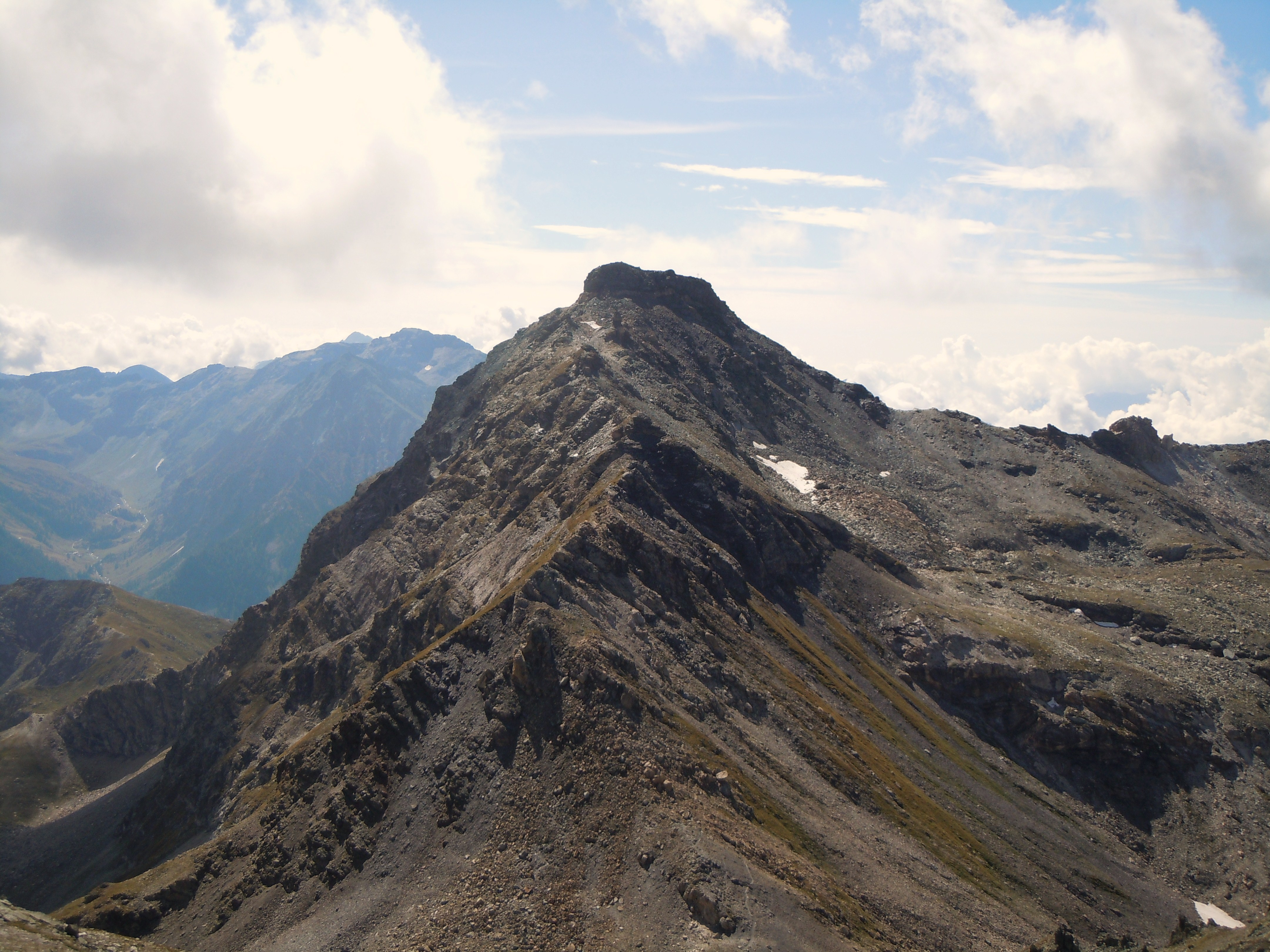
- Becca di Nana from Becca Trecare

Highest point
- Elevation: 3,010 m (9,880 ft)
- Prominence: 235 m (771 ft)
- Coordinates: 45°50′57″N 7°41′05″E

Geography
- Location within Alps
- Location: Aosta Valley, Italy

Becca di Nana (French: Bec de Nannaz) is a 3,010 m (9,880 ft) tall mountain of the Pennine Alps in northern Italy. Its summit lies on the boundary between the municipalities of Chamois and Ayas in the Aosta Valley, Italy.

== Description ==
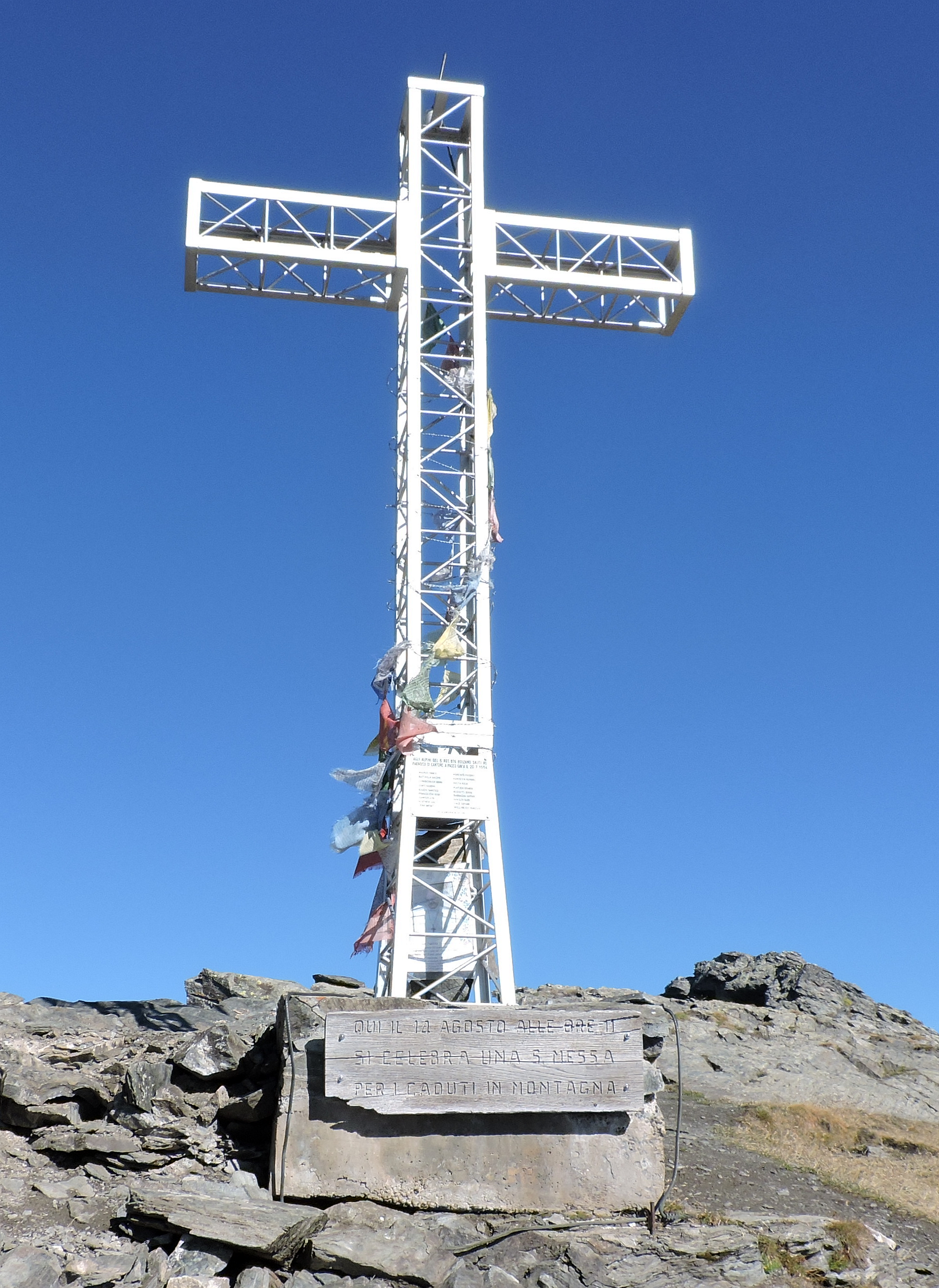
Becca di Nana's summit cross

Becca di Nana stands on the ridge dividing the Valtournenche in the west from the Ayas Valley to the east. The Col de Nannaz mountain pass (2,773 m, 9,098 ft) is located north of the summit along the ridge, and is followed by Becca Trecare (3,032 m, 9,948 ft).

The summit is home to a stone altar and a large cross erected by the Alpini in memory of 18 fellow soldiers who lost their lives in a tragic accident at Gavia Pass in 1954. Every year, on 14 August, a Holy Mass is celebrated on the summit in remembrance of those who died in the mountains.

== SOIUSA classification ==
According to the SOIUSA (International Standardized Mountain Subdivision of the Alps) the mountain can be classified in the following way:

- main part = Western Alps
- major sector = North Western Alps
- section = Pennine Alps
- subsection = Alpi del Monte Rosa
- supergroup = Contrafforti valdostani del Monte Rosa
- group = Costiera Tournalin-Zerbion
