= Marmore (Dora Baltea) =

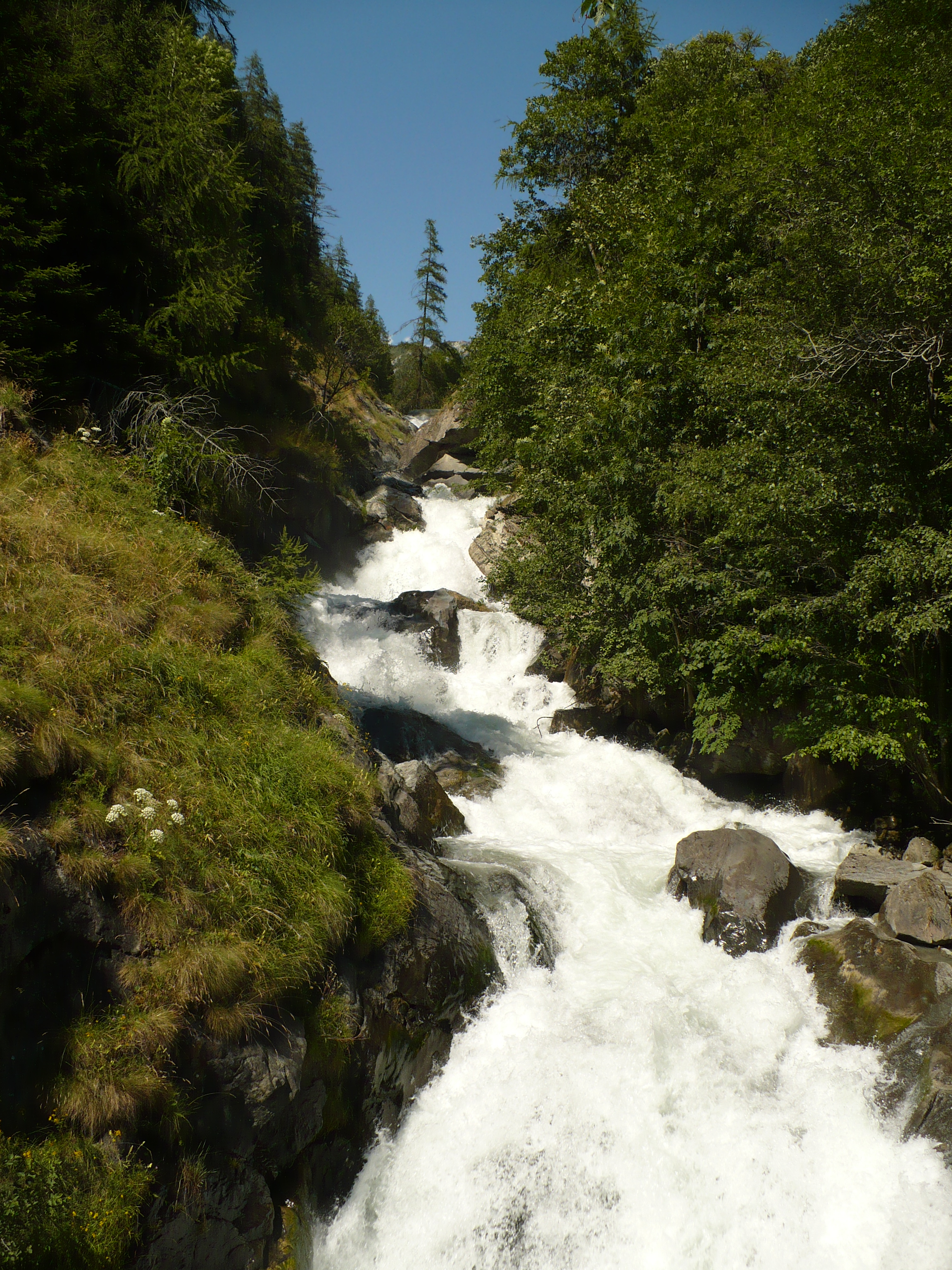

Location
- Country: Italy
- Region: Aosta Valley

Physical characteristics
- Source
  - location: Lake Goillet
- Mouth: Dora Baltea
  - location: Châtillon
  - coordinates: 45°44′29″N 7°37′09″E
- Length: 30.7 km (19.1 mi)
- Basin size: 207.32 km^{2} (80.05 sq mi)

Basin features
- Progression: Dora Baltea→ Po→ Adriatic Sea

The Marmore (French: [maʁmɔʁ]) is a stream which flows through the Valtournenche in the Aosta Valley, Italy. It is a tributary of the Dora Baltea.

== Course ==
The stream originates from Lake Goillet in the upper Valtournenche. Along its course, it receives several tributaries that originate from the numerous glaciers in the valley. It flows through the length of the Valtournenche, passing through the Gouffre des Busserailles sinkhole, and finally empties into the Dora Baltea near Châtillon.

The stream is used for hydroelectric power generation and supplies the Châtillon power plant in Châtillon as well as the Covalou power plant in Antey-Saint-André.
