= Mount Meabé =

Mountain in Italy

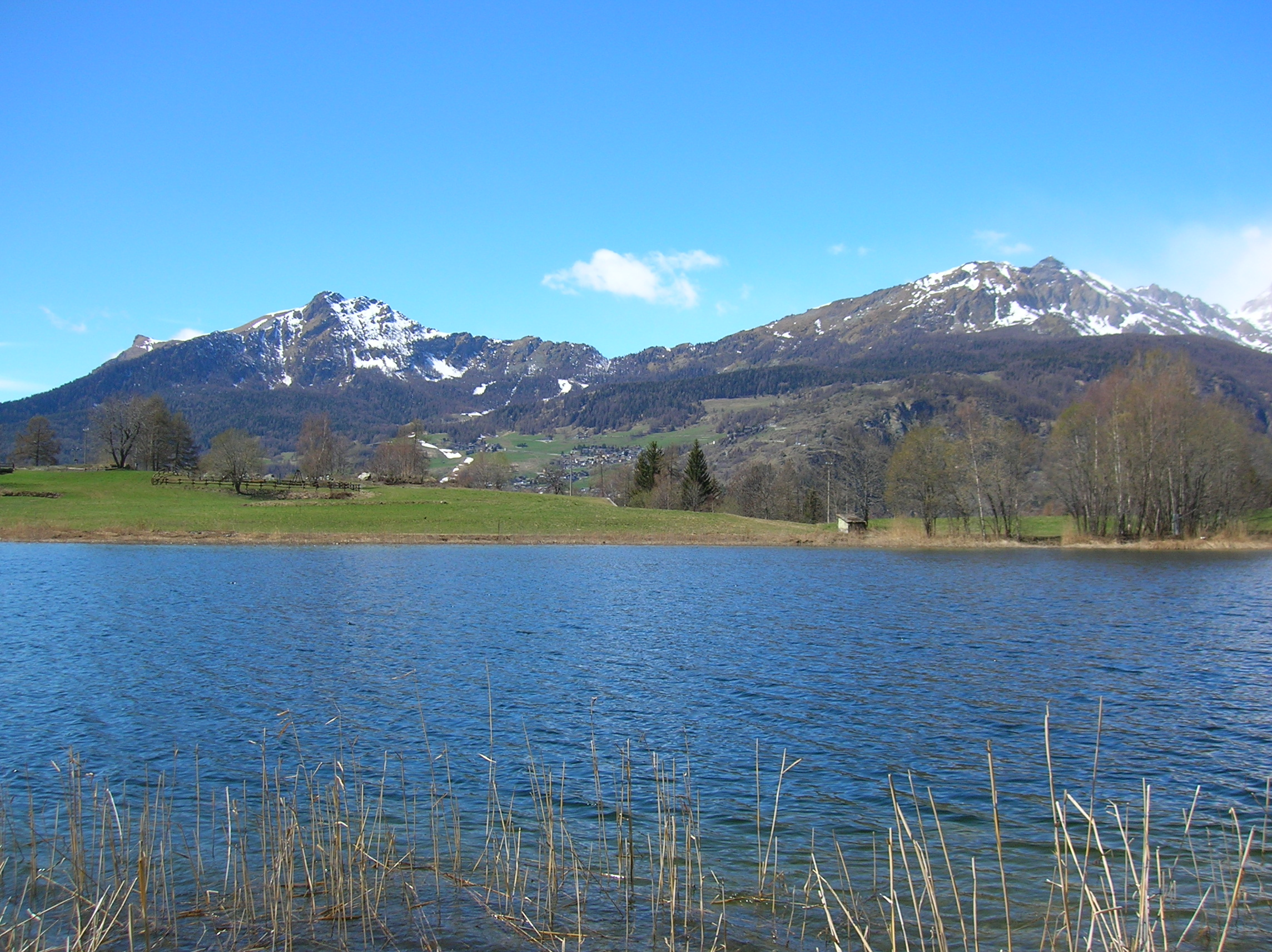
- Mount Meabé, on the right, from Lake Lod

Highest point
- Elevation: 2,615 m (8,579 ft)
- Coordinates: 45°49′41″N 7°32′47″E

Geography
- Location within Alps
- Location: Aosta Valley, Italy

Mount Meabé (Italian: Monte Meabé; French: Mont Meabé) is a 2,615 m (8,579 ft) tall mountain of the Pennine Alps in northern Italy. Its summit lies on the boundary between the municipalities of Torgnon and Nus in the Aosta Valley, Italy.

== Description ==
Mount Meabé rises along the ridge which, extending longitudinally, culminates to the north in the southern summit of Mount Redessau (3,237 m, 10,620 ft), separating the Valtournenche to the east from the Saint-Barthélemy Valley to the west. To the south, along the ridge, the mountain is preceded by Becca d'Aver (2,429 m, 7,969 ft), while to the north it is followed by Cima Bianca (3,008 m, 9,869 ft).

The mountain has a main summit and a slightly lower subsidiary summit (2,565 m, 8,415 ft).

== Ascent ==
The ascent to the subsidiary summit usually starts from the hamlet of Chantorné, above Torgnon.

== SOIUSA classification ==
According to the SOIUSA (International Standardized Mountain Subdivision of the Alps) the mountain can be classified in the following way:

- main part = Western Alps
- major sector = North Western Alps
- section = Pennine Alps
- subsection = Alpi del Weisshorn e del Cervino
- supergroup = Catena Luseney-Cian
- group = Gruppo Cian-Redessau-Cima Bianca
