= Refuge Grand Tournalin =

Mountain hut in Aosta Valley, Italy

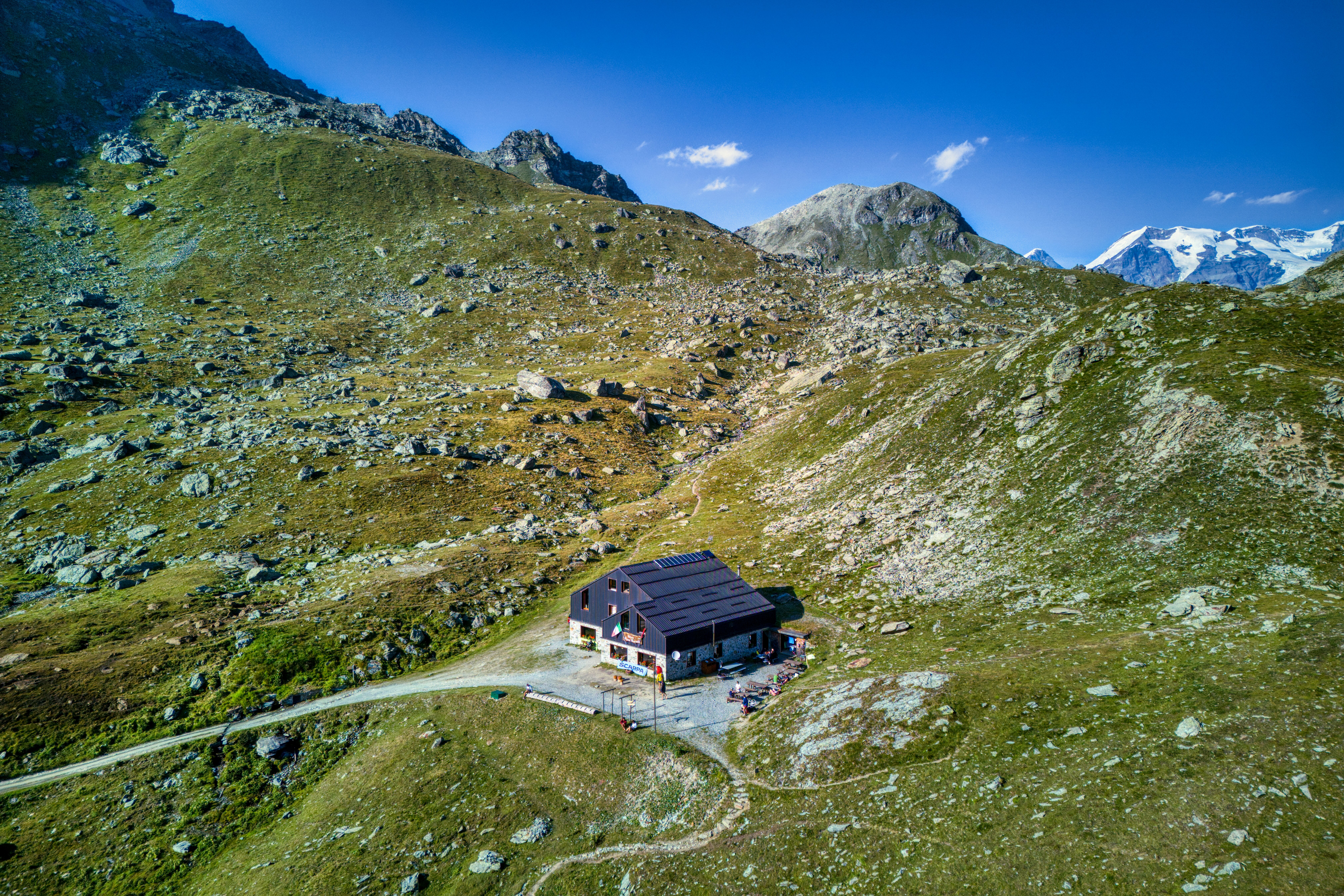
- Refuge Grand Tournalin
- Interactive map of the Refuge Grand Tournalin area

General information
- Coordinates: 45°51′31″N 7°41′37″E
- Year built: 1994
- Owner: Becquet and Chanoux families

The Grand Tournalin Refuge (Italian: Rifugio Grand Tournalin, French: Refuge Grand Tournalin) is a mountain hut located at an altitude of 2,550 meters in the Pennine Alps, within the Aosta Valley, Italy. It lies in the high Val d'Ayas, in the Nana valley, at the base of the Grand Tournalin mountain.

The refuge is a popular stop along the High route no.1 trekking route.

== Access ==
The refuge can be easily reached starting from Saint-Jacques-des-Allemand (1,689 meters). The hike takes approximately 2 to 3 hours. An alternative access route departs from Cheneil, in the Valtournenche valley.

== History ==
The refuge was built and inaugurated in 1994. It is privately owned and managed by the Becquet and Chanoux families.

== Routes ==
=== Ascents ===
- Grand Tournalin (3,379 m)
- Petit Tournalin (3,207 m)
- Mont Roisetta (3,334 m)
- Becca Trécare (3,031 m)
- Becca de Nannaz (3,011 m)

=== Passages ===
- Col de Nannaz (2,772 m) – connects to the Valtournenche valley
- Col du Tournalin (3,145 m)
- Route over Mont Roisetta

== Nearby Points of Interest ==
- The alpine lakes in the Nana valley
- Monte Croce (Fr. Mont-Croix) and Palon de Nana
- Punta Falinère

== Gallery ==
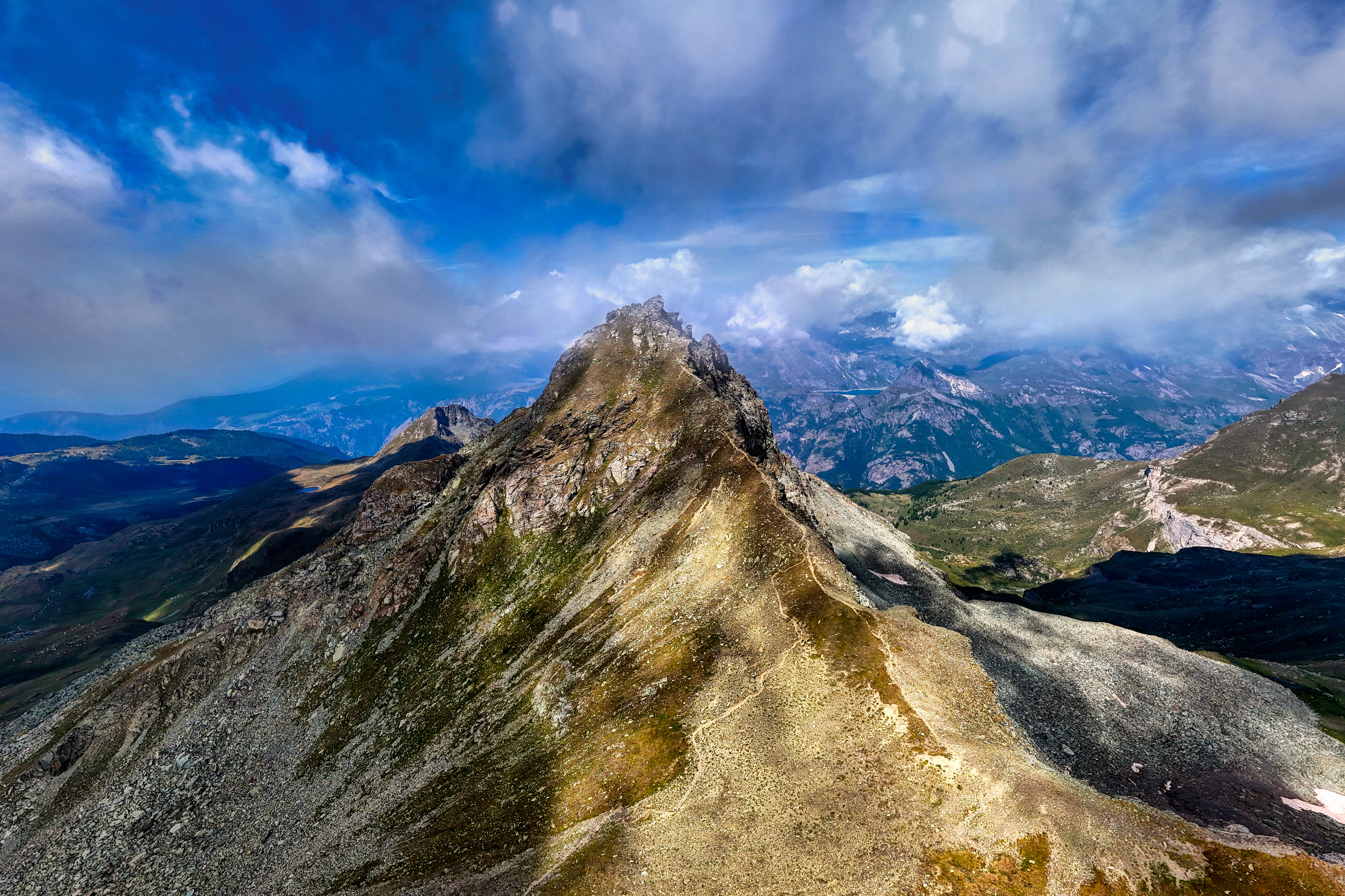
Becca Trécare

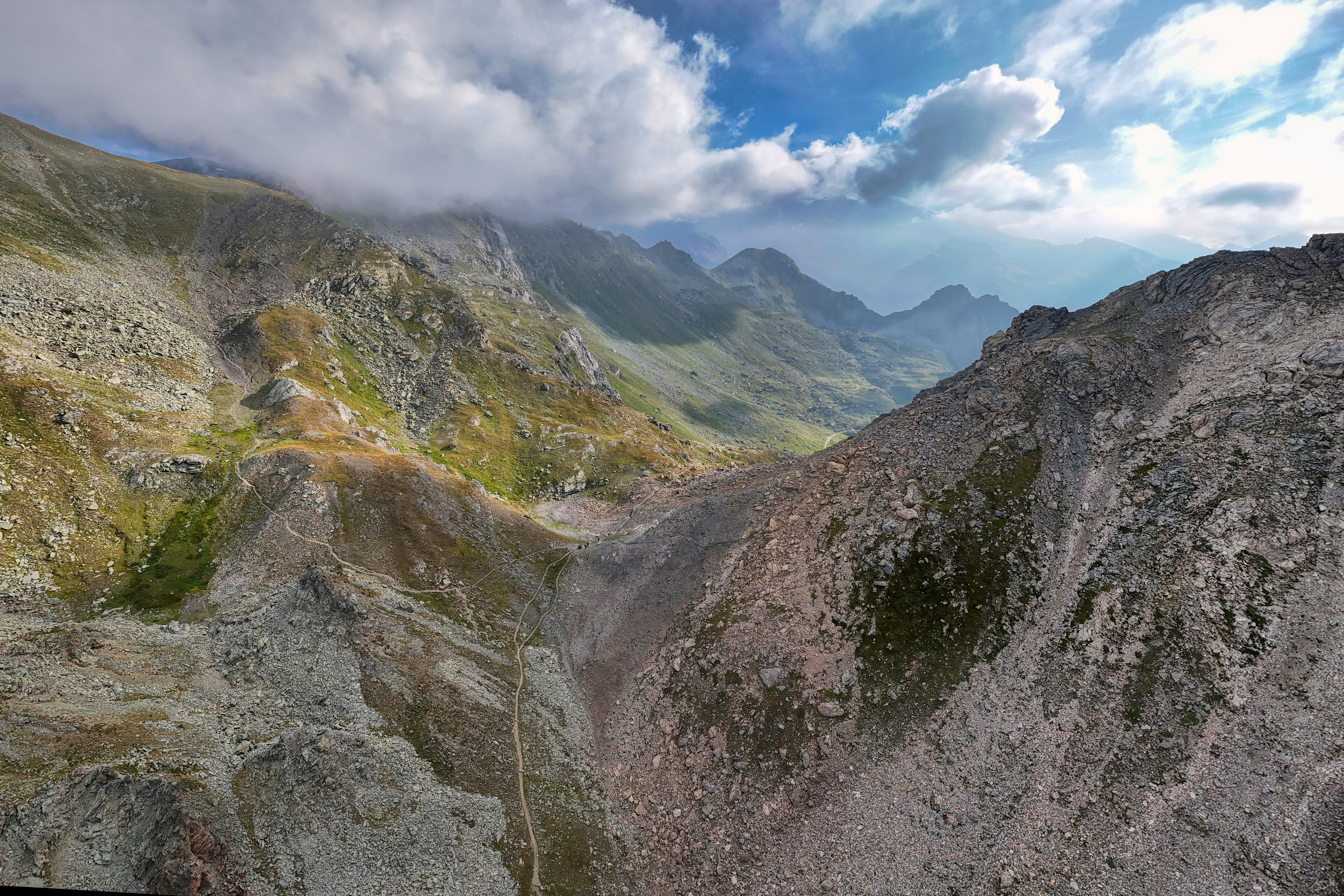
Col de Nannaz

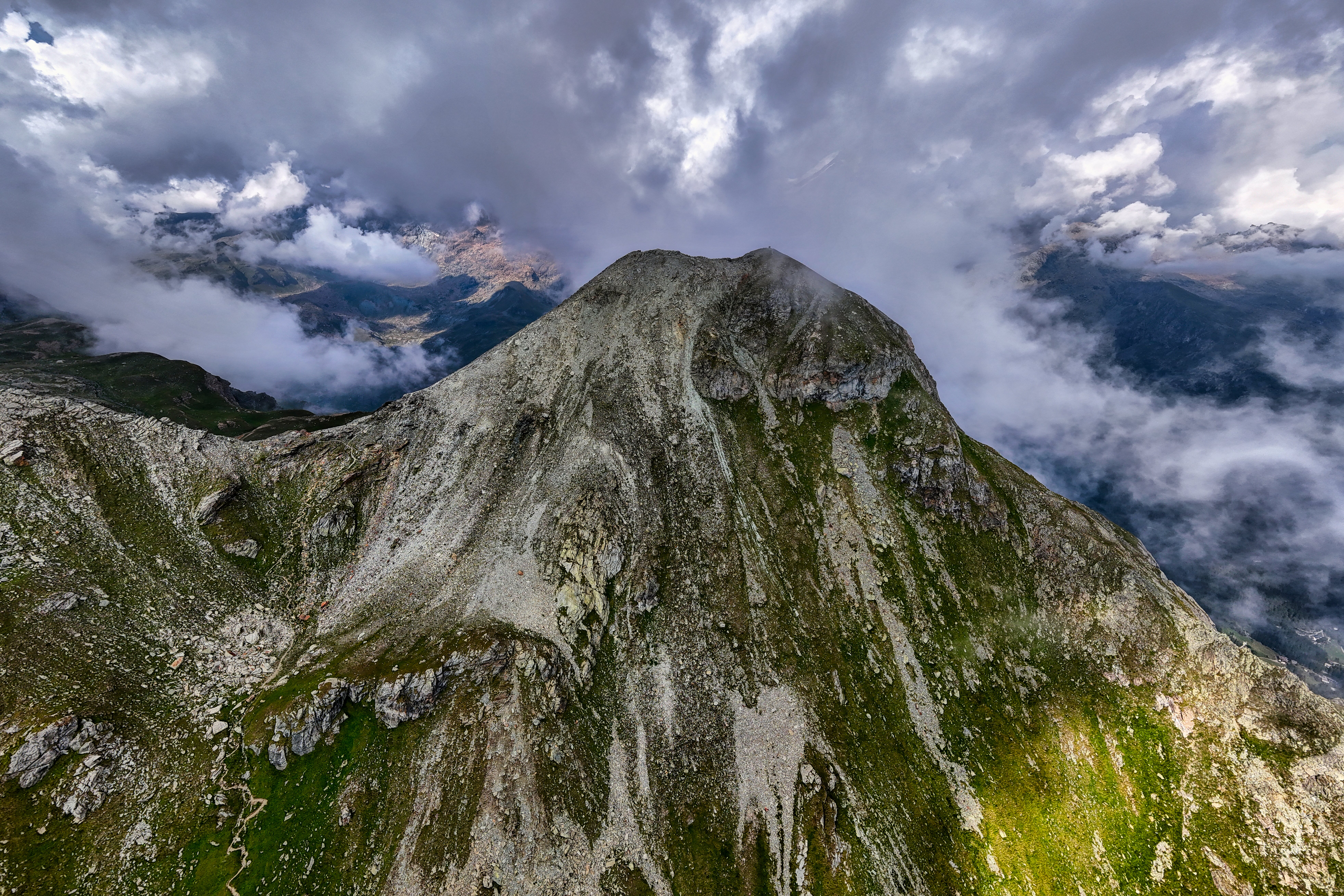
Monte Croce (Fr. Mont-Croix)

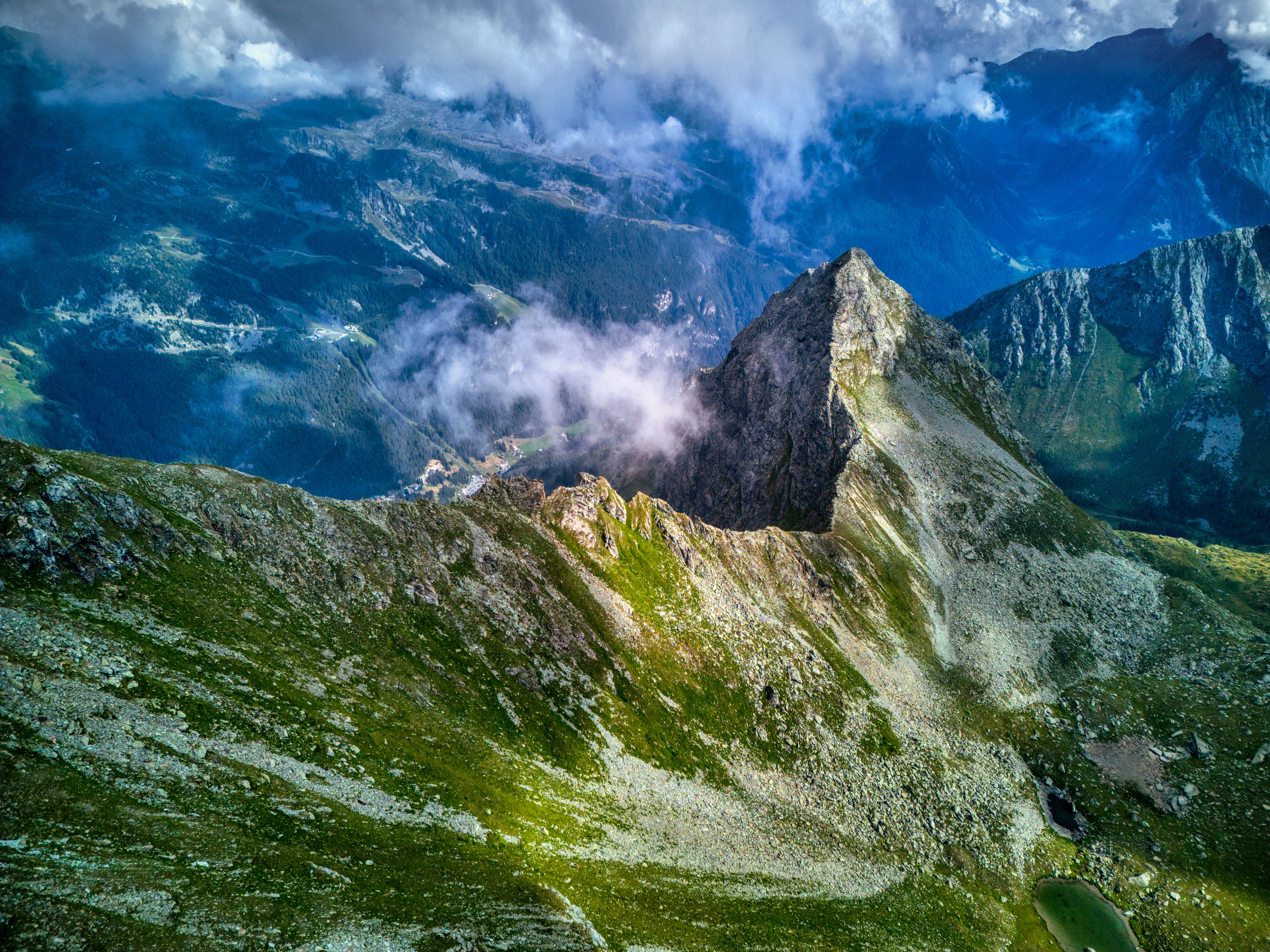
Palon de Nana

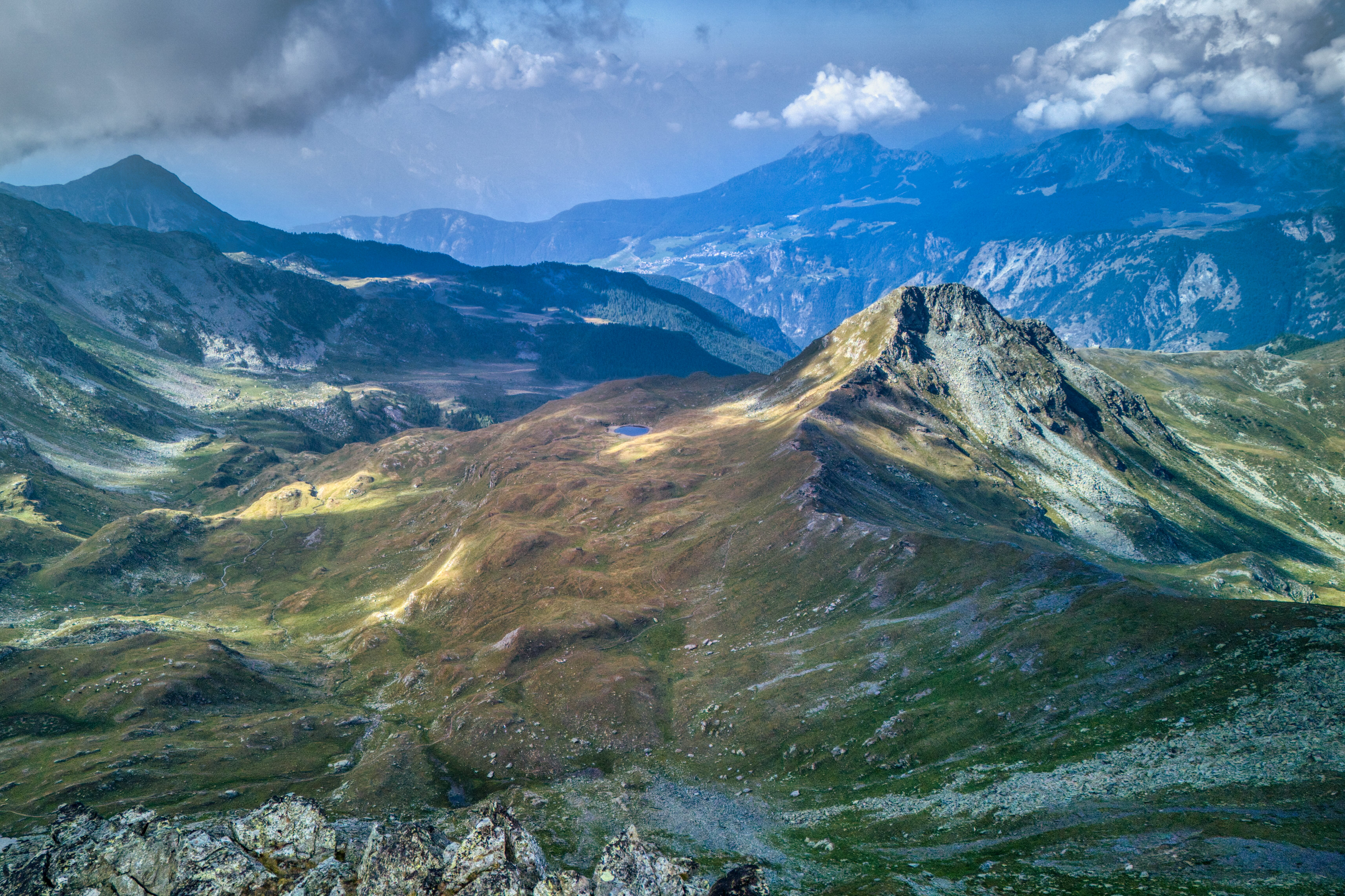
Punta Falinère

== See also ==
- Grand Tournalin
- List of mountain huts in Italy
