= Château des Dames =

Mountain in Italy

- Château des Dames from Mount Rous

Highest point
- Elevation: 3,489 m (11,447 ft)
- Coordinates: 45°54′58″N 7°34′37″E

Geography
- Location within Alps
- Location: Aosta Valley, Italy

Château des Dames is a 3,489 m (11,447 ft) tall mountain of the Pennine Alps in northern Italy. It lies on the border between the municipalities of Valtournenche and Bionaz in the Aosta Valley, Italy.

== Name ==
The name Château des Dames means "Ladies' Castle" in French.

== Description ==
Château des Dames forms part of a mountain ridge separating the upper Valpelline to the west from the upper Valtournenche to the east, which continues northwards to form the Petites Murailles mountain system. The mountain's western slope overlooking Valpelline is predominantly glaciated.

== Ascent ==
The ascent to the summit of Château des Dames can be made from the Valpelline side, starting at the Place Moulin dam, or from the Valtournenche side, with the approach beginning at Avouil and continuing through the Vofrède Valley.

== SOIUSA classification ==
According to the SOIUSA (International Standardized Mountain Subdivision of the Alps) the mountain can be classified in the following way:

- main part = Western Alps
- major sector = North Western Alps
- section = Pennine Alps
- subsection = Alpi del Weisshorn e del Cervino
- supergroup = Catena Bouquetins-Cervino
- group = Gruppo Dents d'Hérens-Cervino
