= Chamois, Aosta Valley =

Chamois Tsamoué (Valdôtain)
- Comune
- Comune di Chamois; Commune de Chamois
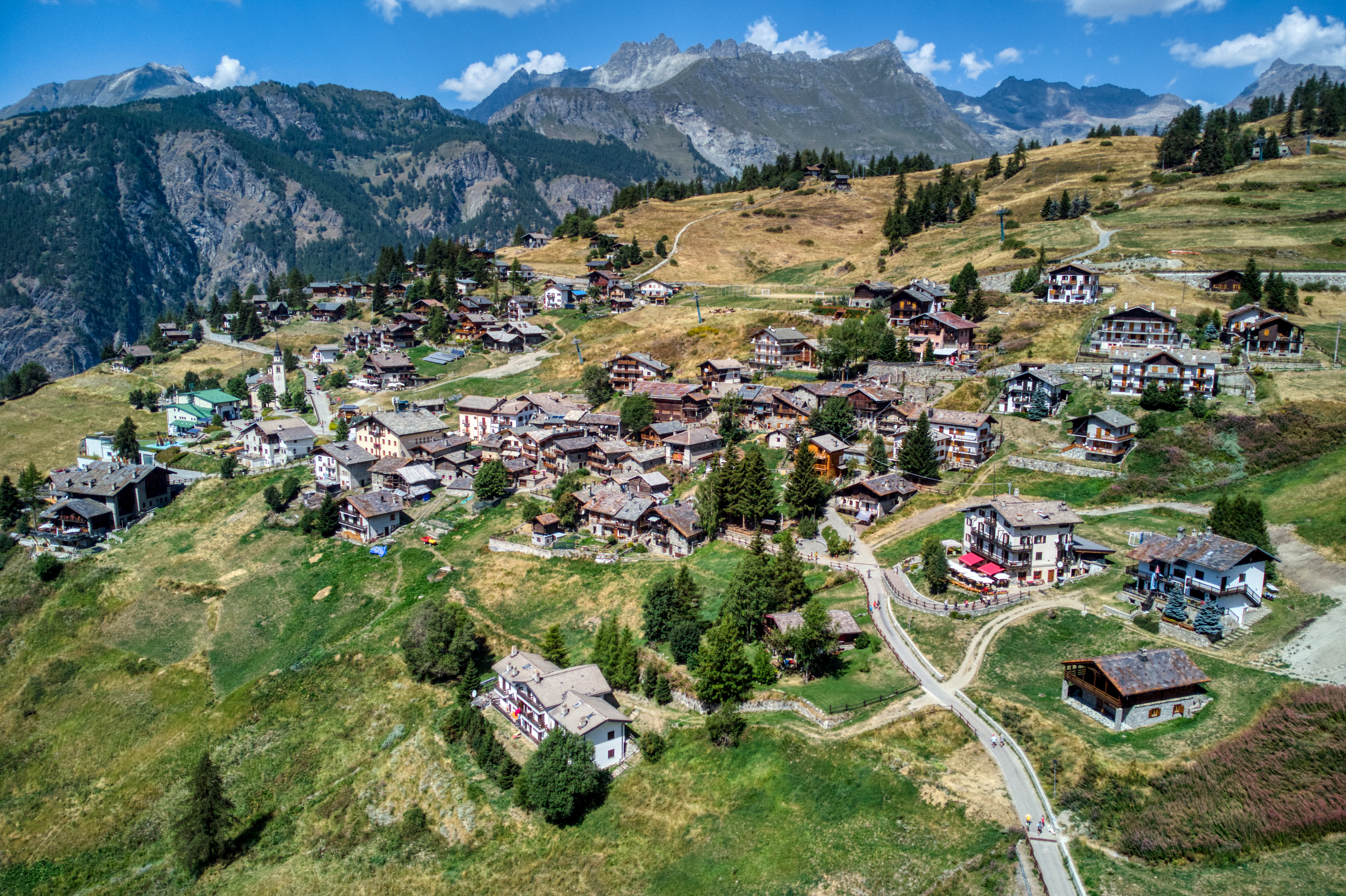

- Coat of arms

- Location within Italy Location within Aosta Valley
- Coordinates: 45°50′N 7°37′E
- Country: Italy
- Region: Aosta Valley
- Frazioni: Caillaz, Corgnolaz, Crépin, La Ville, Lac de Lod, Liussel, Suisse

Area
  - Total: 14 km^{2} (5.4 sq mi)
- Elevation: 1,800 m (5,900 ft)

Population (31 December 2022)
  - Total: 108
  - Density: 7.7/km^{2} (20/sq mi)
- Demonym: Chamoisiens
- Time zone: UTC+1 (CET)
  - Summer (DST): UTC+2 (CEST)
- Postal code: 11020
- Dialing code: 0166
- Patron saint: Saint Pantaleon
- Saint day: 26 July
- Website: Official website

Chamois (French: [ʃamwa]; Valdôtain: Tsamoué) is a town and comune in the Aosta Valley region of northwestern Italy.

Chamois is the only municipality in Italy not reachable by motorized vehicles.

Visitors can access Chamois by cable car or via a walking path originating at La Magdeleine.

Chamois became a separate parish only in 1681, when it was separated from Antey-Saint-André. The village church, dedicated to Saint Pantaleon, was built in the same year. The present form of the structure dates from a rebuilding in 1838.

== Parish church ==
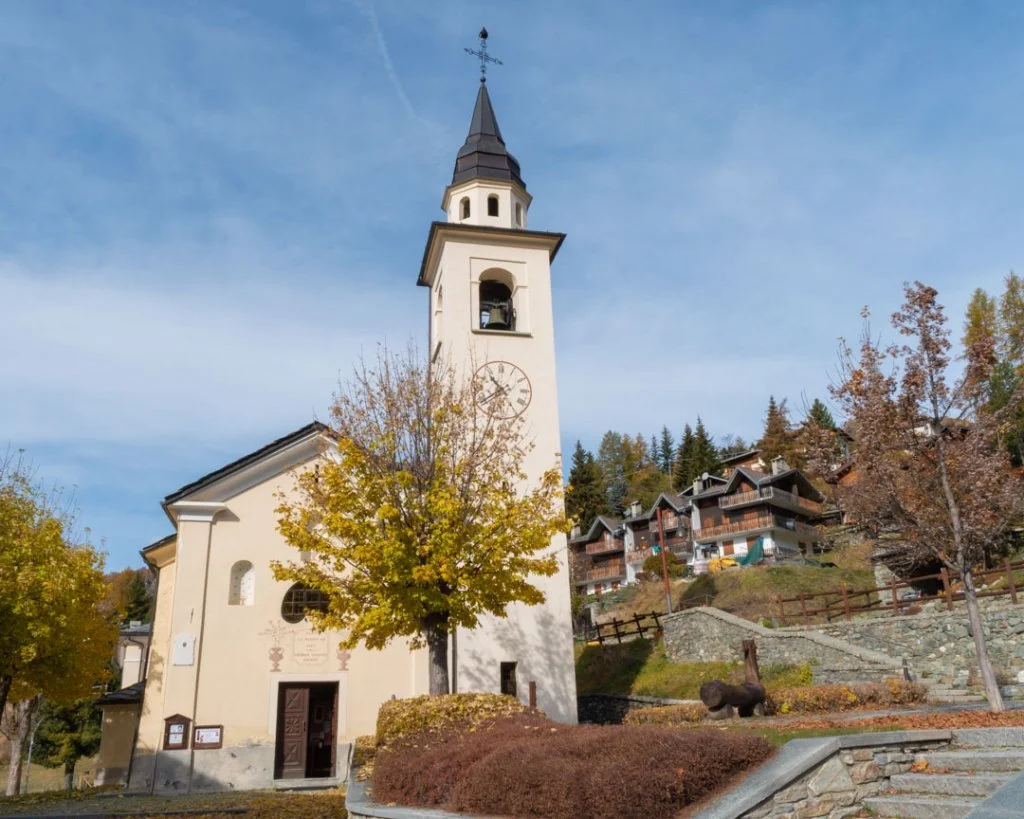
The Saint Pantaleon parish church in Chamois.

The Saint Pantaleon parish church (Italian: Chiesa parrocchiale di San Pantaleone; French: Église paroissiale Saint-Pantaléon) is the local Roman Catholic church. The territory of Chamois belonged to the parish of Antey-Saint-André until the 17th century. The founding of a separate parish was initiated by the curate of Antey, Martin Jeanthon, a native of Chamois: at his request, the parish church was consecrated on July 21, 1681, by the Bishop of Aosta, Antoine-Philibert Bailly, replacing a rectory that had existed since 1621. The church was later expanded and transformed, taking on its current form in 1838. In 1844, the present-day rectory was built next to the church. It served as the priest's residence but also functioned as a school and a first aid station.

The church has a single-nave structure, with a quadrangular apse and a bell tower equipped with four bells. The interior houses an 18th-century high altar originating from the parish of Torgnon, made of carved wood, painted and partly gilded. It features a painting of the Immaculate Conception set between two twisted half-columns that support two angels, as well as painted wooden statues of Saint Pantaleon, a Holy Pope, and a Holy Bishop.

== Gallery ==
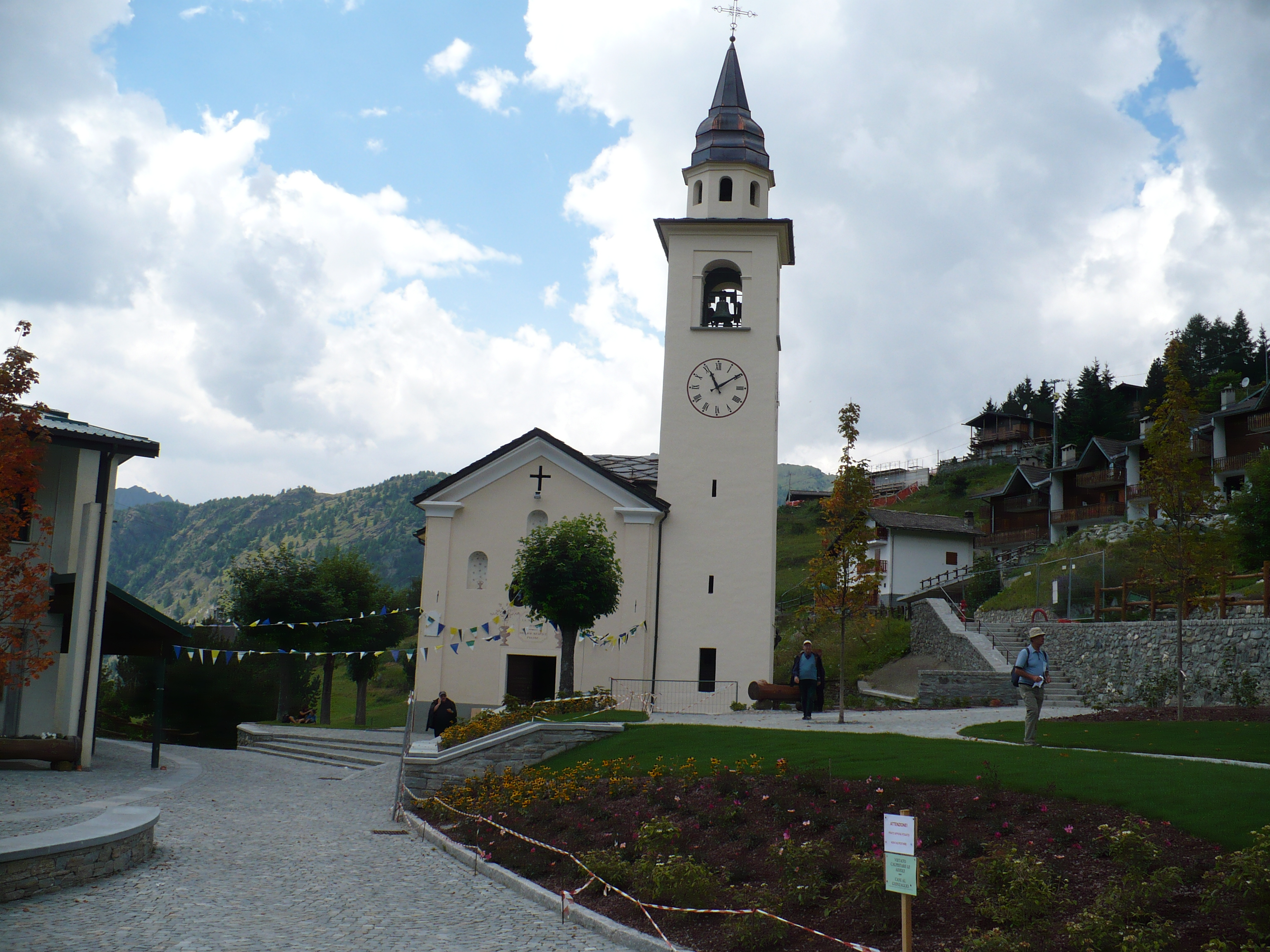
The parish church of Chamois

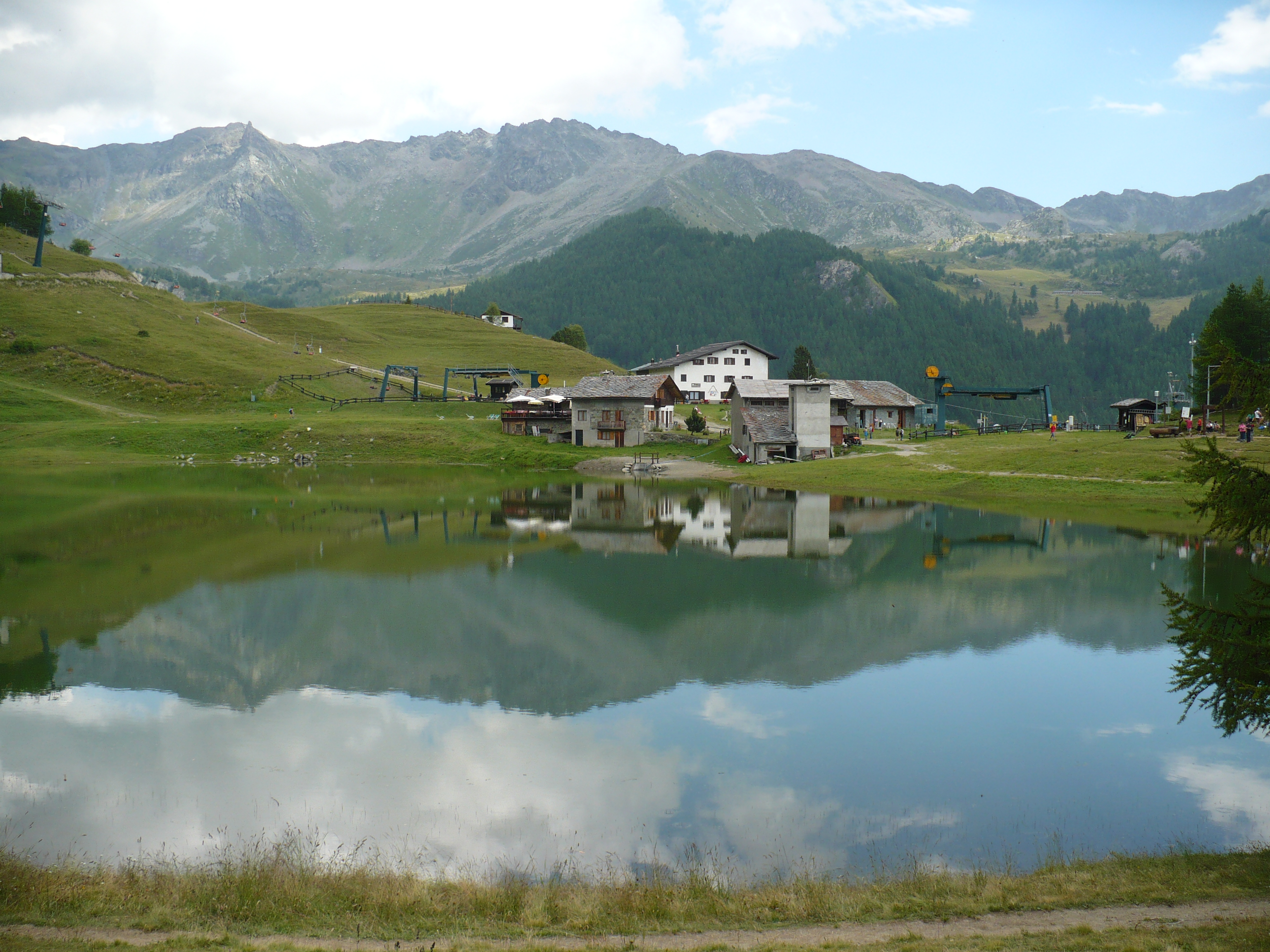
The Lod lake

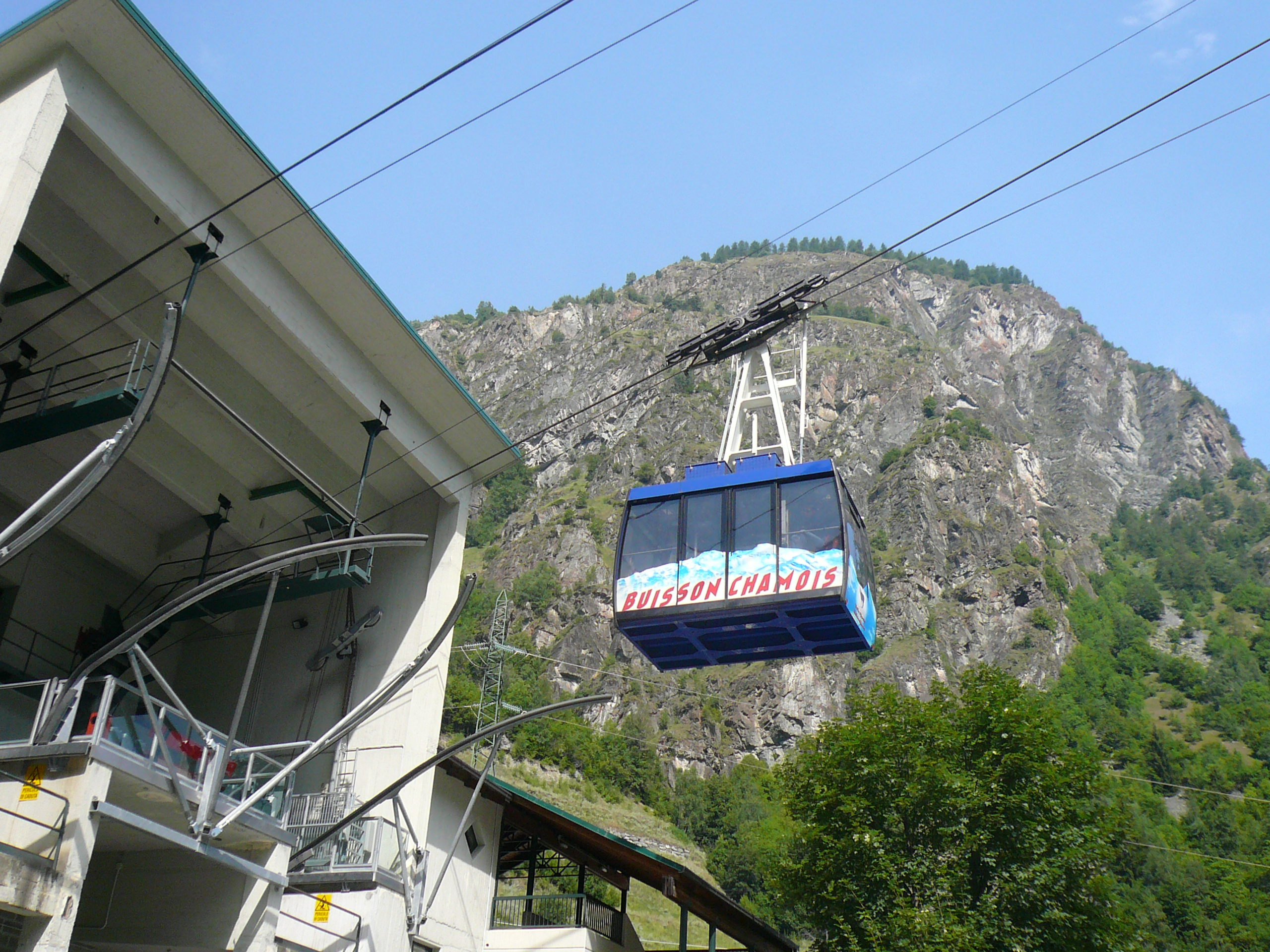
Cable car station in Buisson

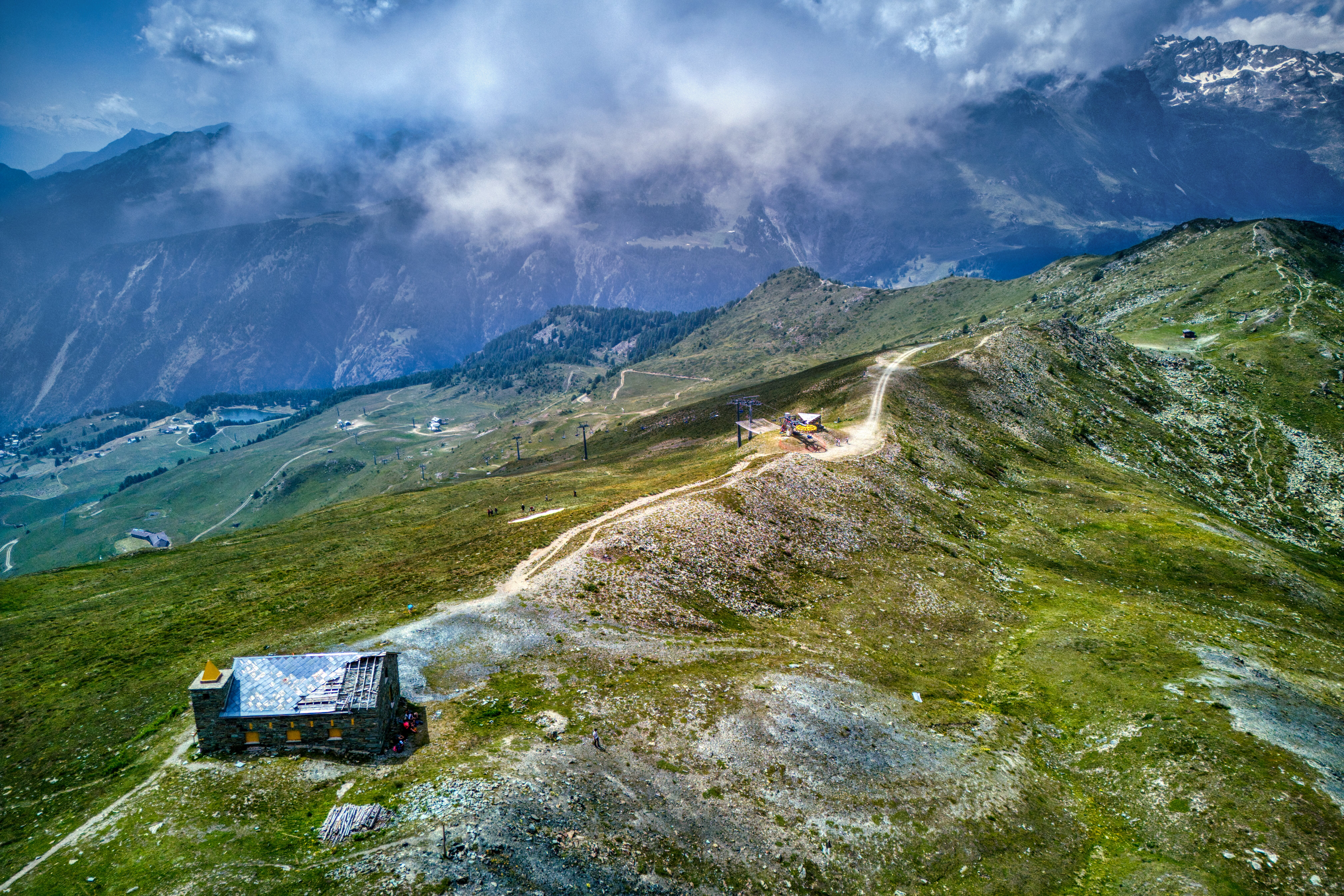
Falinère chairlift
