= Becca d'Aver =

Mountain in Italy

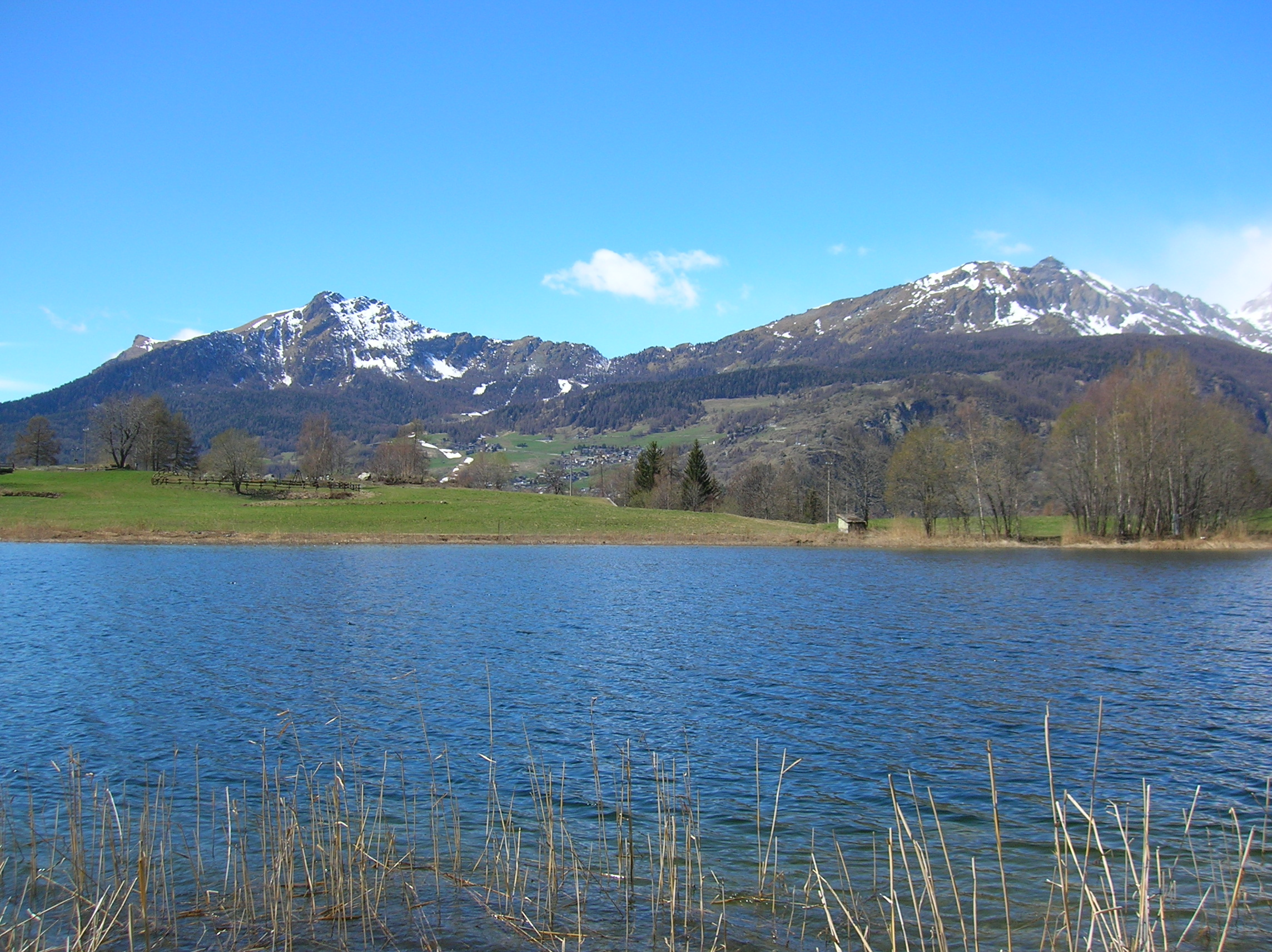
- Becca d'Aver, on the left, from Lake Lod

Highest point
- Elevation: 2,469 m (8,100 ft)
- Prominence: 287 m (942 ft)
- Coordinates: 45°48′03″N 7°32′08″E

Geography
- Location within Alps
- Location: Aosta Valley, Italy

Becca d'Aver is a 2,469 m (8,100 ft) tall mountain of the Pennine Alps in northern Italy. Its summit lies on the boundary between the municipalities of Torgnon, Nus and Verrayes in the Aosta Valley, Italy.

== Description ==
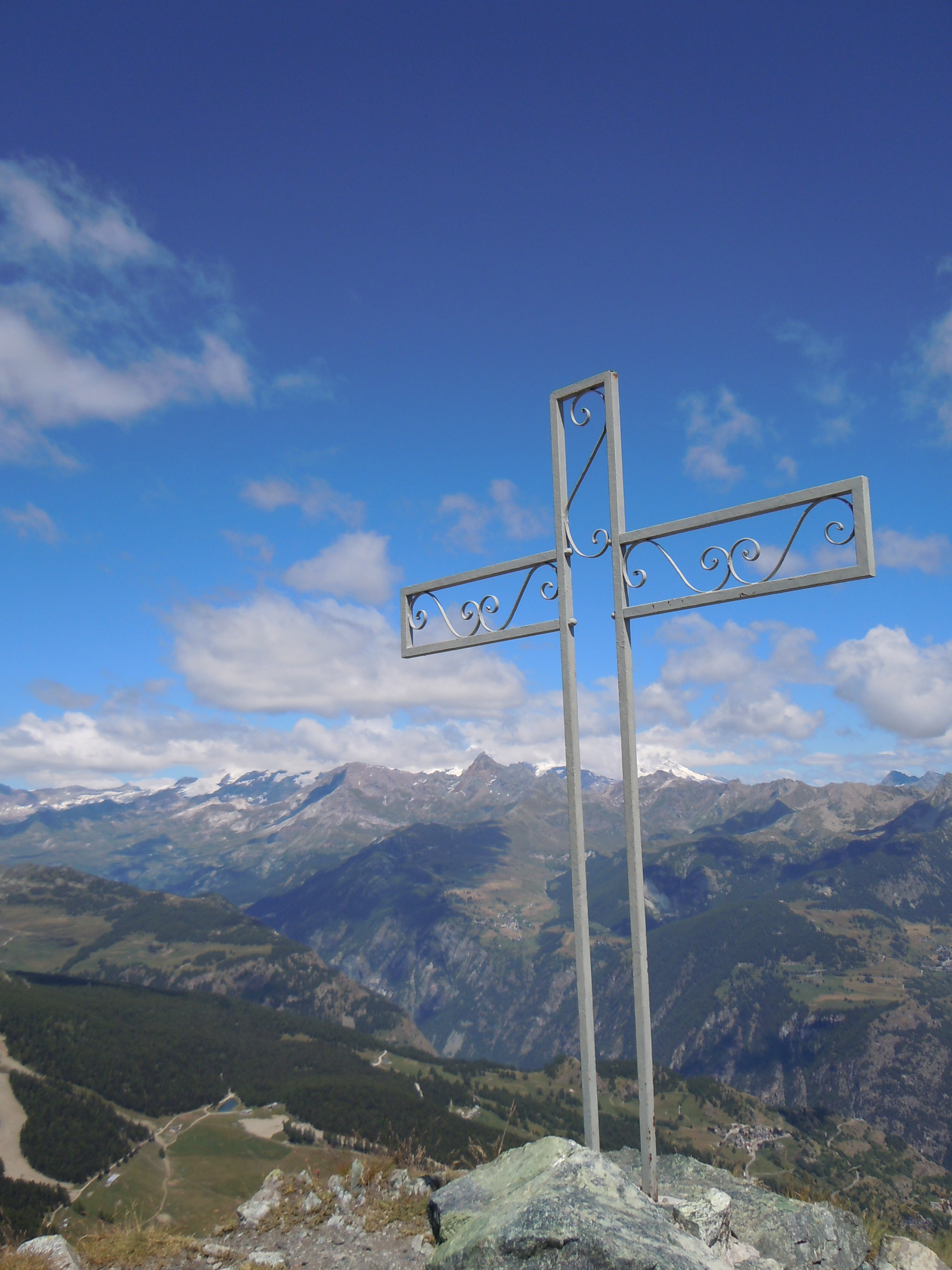
Becca d'Aver's summit cross

Becca d'Aver stands on the ridge dividing the Valtournenche in the east from the Saint-Barthélemy Valley to the west. The summit is located immediately to the north of Col d'Aver mountain pass (2,330 m, 7,640 ft), and about 1.5 km (0.93 mi) south of Col Fenêtre mountain pass (2,175 m, 7,136 ft), which divides it from Mount Meabé (2,615 m, 8,579 ft).

The summit is home to a metal summit cross.

== Ascent ==
The summit can be reached in about two and a half hours from Lozon, a hamlet of Verrayes, or from Chantorné, a hamlet of Torgnon, or in about two hours from Praz, a hamlet of Nus.

== SOIUSA classification ==
According to the SOIUSA (International Standardized Mountain Subdivision of the Alps) the mountain can be classified in the following way:

- main part = Western Alps
- major sector = North Western Alps
- section = Pennine Alps
- subsection = Alpi del Weisshorn e del Cervino
- supergroup = Catena Luseney-Cian
- group = Gruppo Cian-Redessau-Cima Bianca
