= Mount Zerbion =

Mountain in Aosta Valley, Italy

- French: Mont Dzerbion; Italian: Monte Zerbion
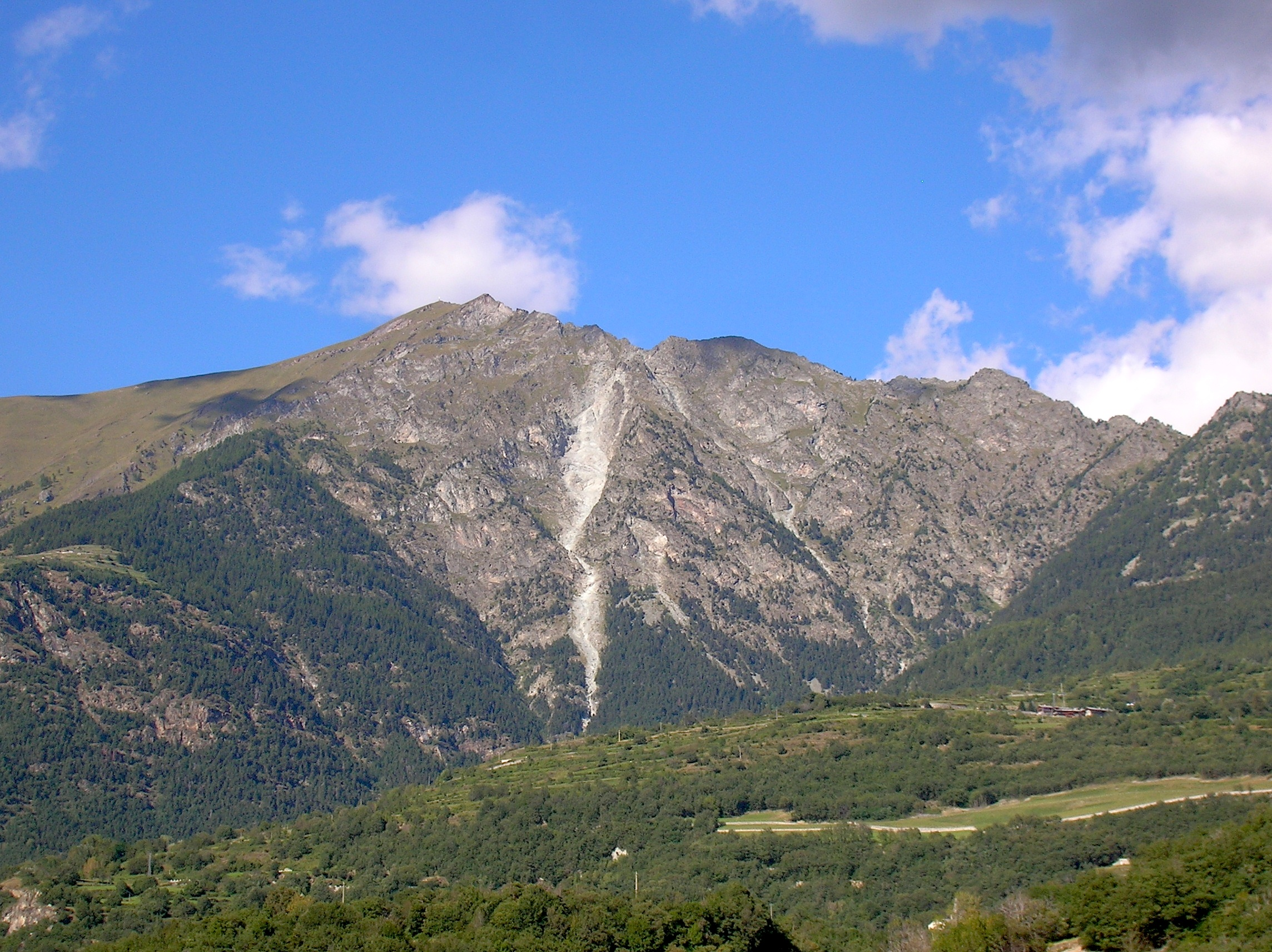

Highest point
- Elevation: 2,719 m (8,921 ft)
- Prominence: 309 m (1,014 ft)
- Isolation: 4.65 km (2.89 mi)
- Listing: Mountains of Italy
- Coordinates: 45°47′17″N 7°39′50″E

Geography
- Location within Alps Location within Italy
- Location: Aosta Valley, Italy
- Parent range: Pennine Alps

Climbing
- Easiest route: Hike

Mount Zerbion (French and officially: Mont Dzerbion, alternatively Mont Zerbion; Italian: Monte Zerbion; altitude 2,719 m) is a mountain of the Pennine Alps in Aosta Valley, Italy. It lies between the eastern Ayas Valley and the Valtournenche to the west.

== Description ==
It is usually climbed from the Ayas side, starting from the village of Barmasc, from where it is a simple hike up to the summit.

It is also a popular peak for ski mountaineering.

The view from the top includes the entire Monte Rosa group and the Matterhorn. A large statue of Mary, mother of Jesus lies on its summit.
