= Lake Goillet =

Artificial lake of the Pennine Alps

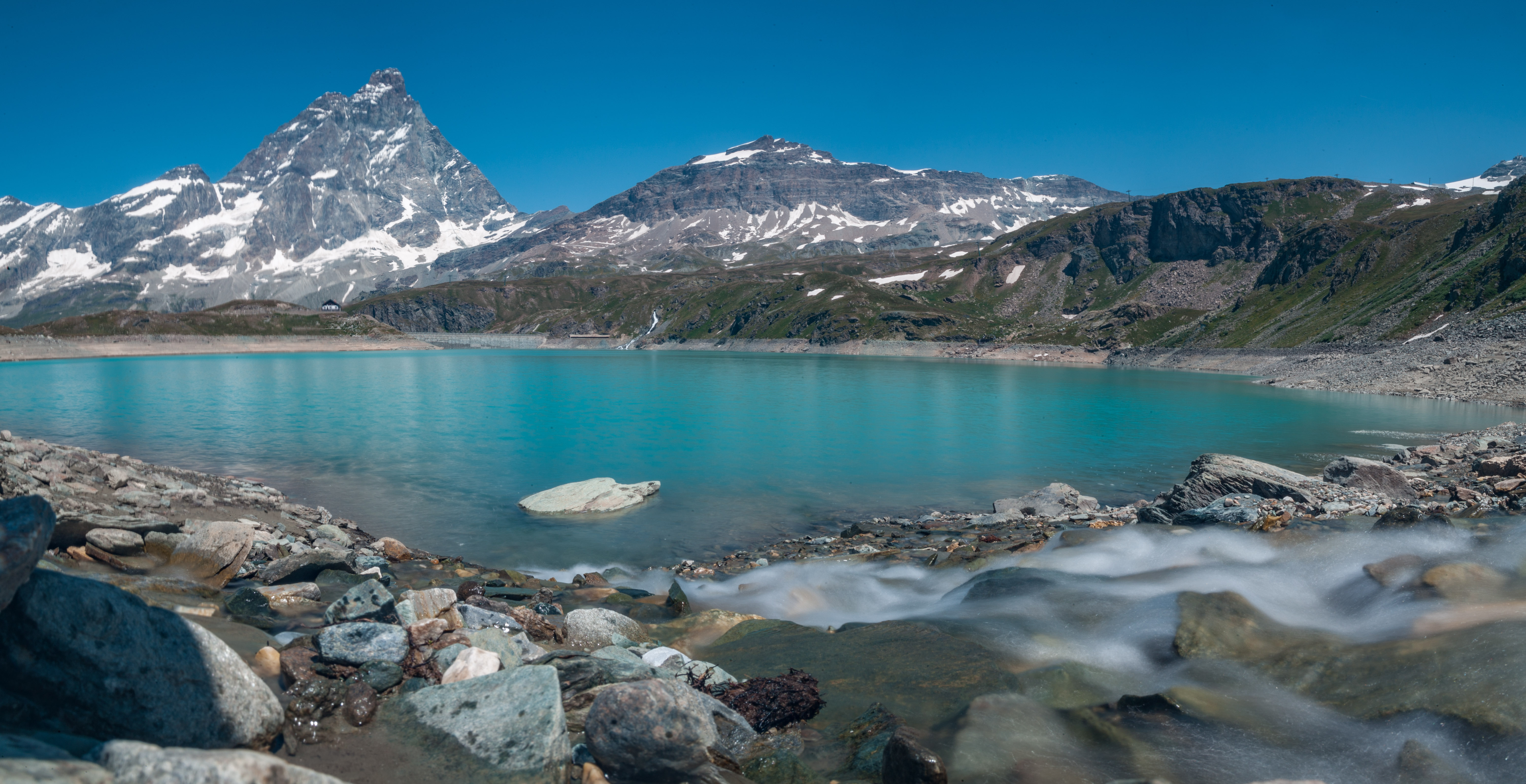
- The lake with the Matterhorn in the background

- Location within Aosta Valley Location within Italy Location within Alps
- Interactive map of Lake Goillet
- Location: Valtournenche, Aosta Valley, Italy
- Coordinates: 45°55′45″N 7°39′54″E
- Catchment area: 6.3 km^{2} (2.4 sq mi)
- Basin countries: Italy
- Surface elevation: 2,516 m (8,255 ft)

Lake Goillet (Italian: Lago Goillet, French: Lac Goillet) is an artificial mountain lake of the Pennine Alps, located close to the Breuil-Cervinia ski resort in Valtournenche, Aosta Valley, Italy.

== History ==
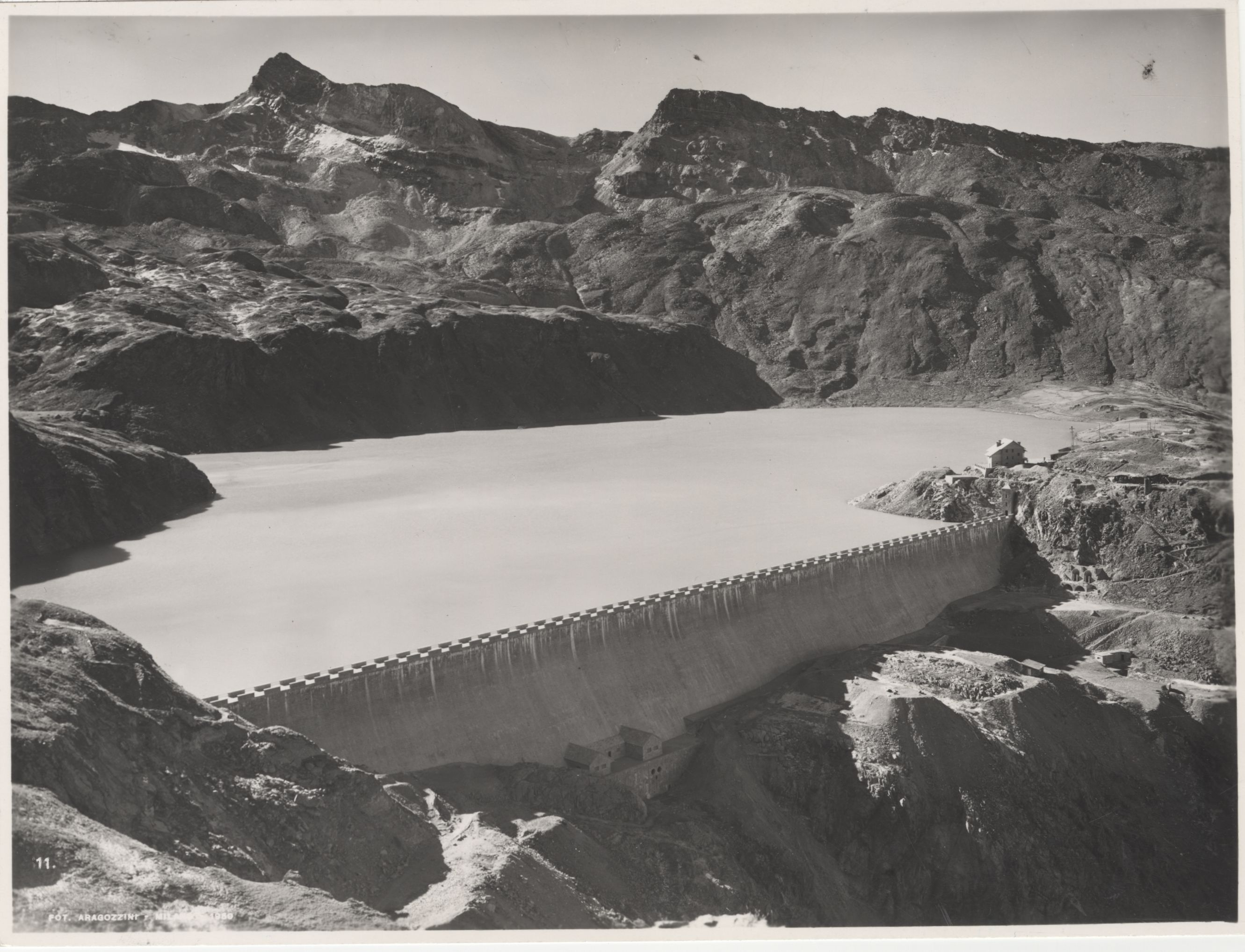
The lake in 1958

The lake was formed through the construction of a dam with the purpose of creating hydroelectric energy. The dam was built thanks to the small railway that ran from above Les Perrères directly to the lake. The railway was later decommissioned, and only the tracks remain as evidence of its existence. The lake is also used for artificial snowmaking on the ski slopes.

== Description ==
The lake has a water surface area of 0.48 km² and is located at an altitude of 2,516 m (8,255 ft) above sea level. Its waters feed the Marmore river.

The lake can be accessed from Plan Maison.
