= Grand Tournalin =

Mountain in Italy

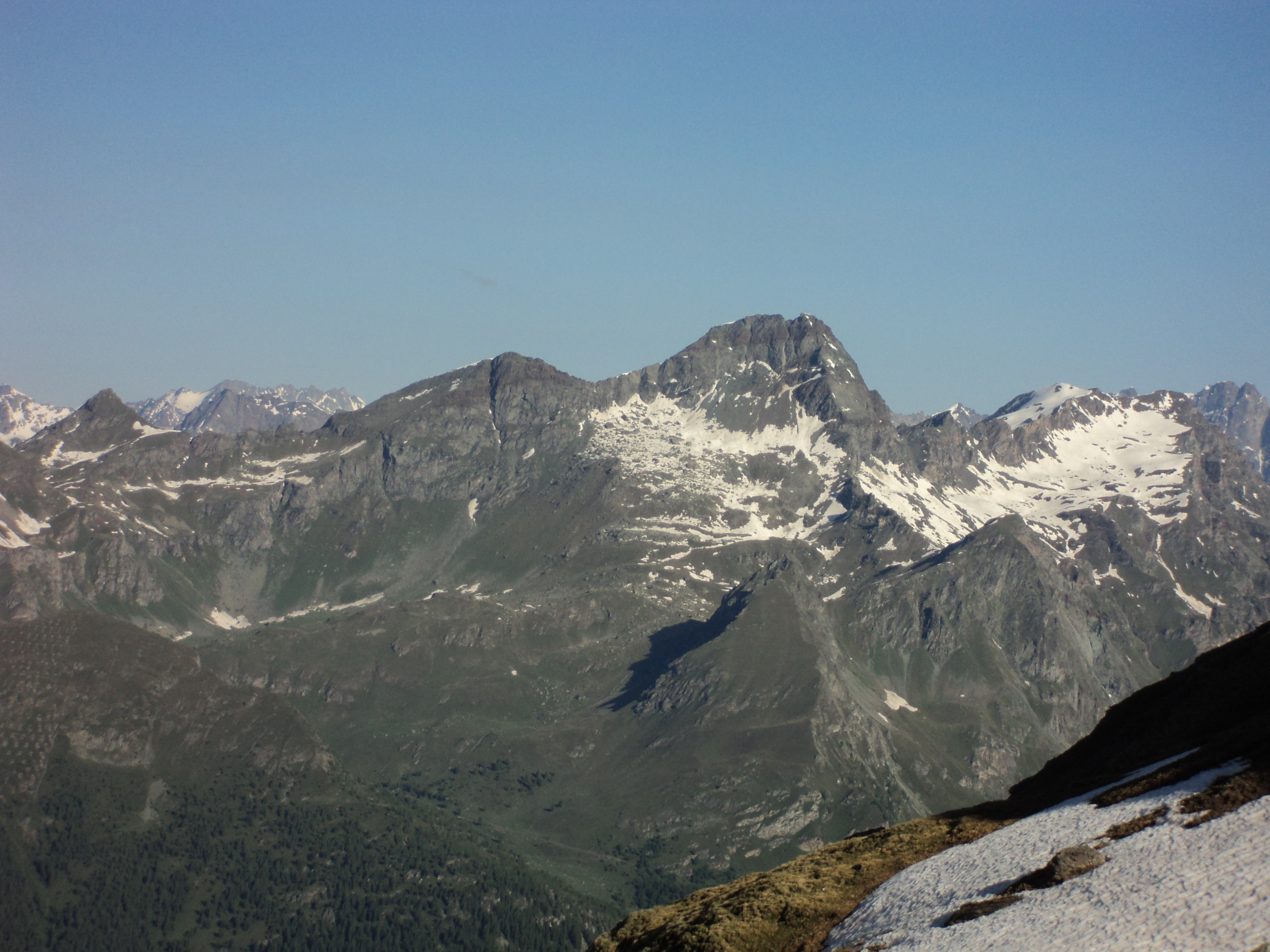
- Grand Tournalin

Highest point
- Elevation: 3,379 m (11,086 ft)
- Listing: Alpine mountains above 3000 m
- Coordinates: 45°52′17″N 7°41′13″E

Geography
- Location within Alps
- Location: Aosta Valley, Italy
- Parent range: Pennine Alps

Climbing
- First ascent: 1863

Grand Tournalin (3,379m) is a mountain of the Monte Rosa Massif in the Pennine Alps in Aosta Valley, Italy. It is the highest mountain between the Ayas Valley and Valtournenche. The mountain is composed of two summits, the north being higher than the south summit by just 9m.

== Climbing ==
The mountain was first climbed in 1863 by Jean-Antoine Carrel and Edward Whymper. It is exclusively climbed from the south ridge, due to the poor quality of the rock on its north side. It is recommended for expert hikers only. The view on the summit is described by Edward Whymper as one of the best in the Alps, with views of the Matterhorn and Monte Rosa, as well as many other famous peaks of the Graian and Pennine Alps.
