= Antey-Saint-André =

Antey-Saint-André Antèy (Valdôtain)
- Comune
- Comune di Antey-Saint-André; Commune d'Antey-Saint-André
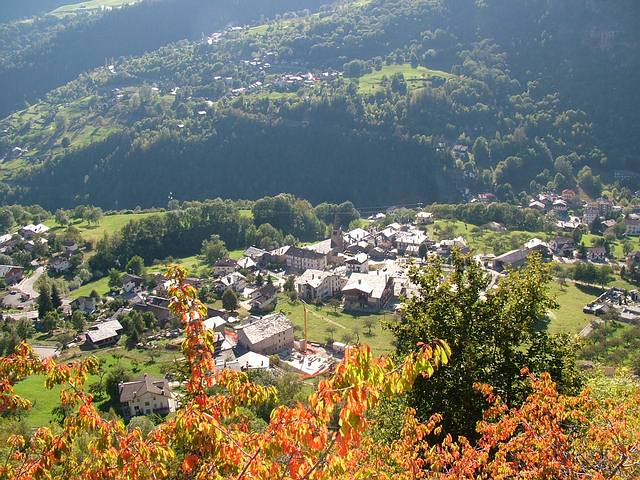
- Antey-Saint-André

- Coat of arms

- Location of Antey-Saint-André in Italy Antey-Saint-André (Aosta Valley)
- Coordinates: 45°48′N 7°36′E
- Country: Italy
- Region: Aosta Valley
- Province: none
- Frazioni: See list

Area
  - Total: 11 km^{2} (4.2 sq mi)
- Elevation: 1,074 m (3,524 ft)

Population (31 December 2022)
  - Total: 538
  - Density: 49/km^{2} (130/sq mi)
- Demonym: Antesans
- Time zone: UTC+1 (CET)
  - Summer (DST): UTC+2 (CEST)
- Postal code: 11020
- Dialing code: 0166
- Patron saint: Saint Andrew the Apostle
- Saint day: 30 November
- Website: Official website

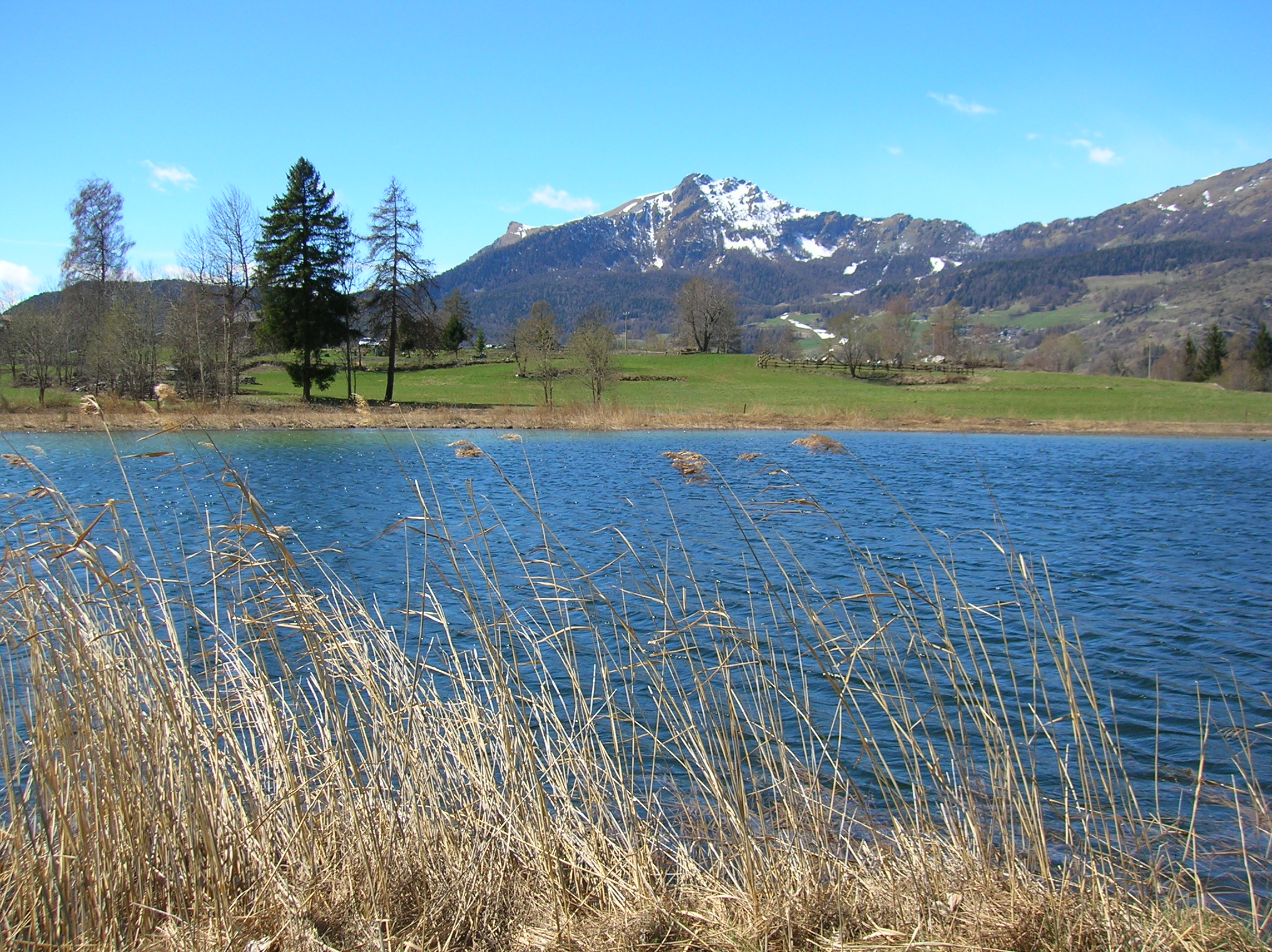
Lod lake

Antey-Saint-André (French: [ɑ̃tɛj sɛ̃t‿ɑ̃dʁe]; Valdôtain: Antèy) is a comune in the Aosta Valley region of northwestern Italy.

== Frazioni ==
Frazioni (locally officially called hameaux, in French) are: Avout, Les Ayeux, Banderet, Le Bourg, Buisson, Cérian, Chaillien, Champagne, Les Chênes, Les Chesods-dessous, Les Chesods-dessus, Chessin, Covalou, Épaillon, Fiernaz, Filey, Les Grands-Moulins, Hérin, Liès, Lillaz, Lillaz-de-Chessin, Lod, Mériou, Navillod, Noussan, Nuarsaz, Parafromiat, Petit-Antey, Rivaz-Vieille-dessous, Rivaz-Vieille-dessus, Ruvère, Sounère, Villettaz.

== Twin towns — sister cities ==
Antey-Saint-André is twinned with:

- Sant'Andrea Apostolo dello Ionio, Italy
- Mornac-sur-Seudre, France
- Les Mathes, France
