= Torgnon =

Torgnon Torgnòn (Valdôtain) Tornjunh (Walser)
- Comune
- Comune di Torgnon; Commune de Torgnon
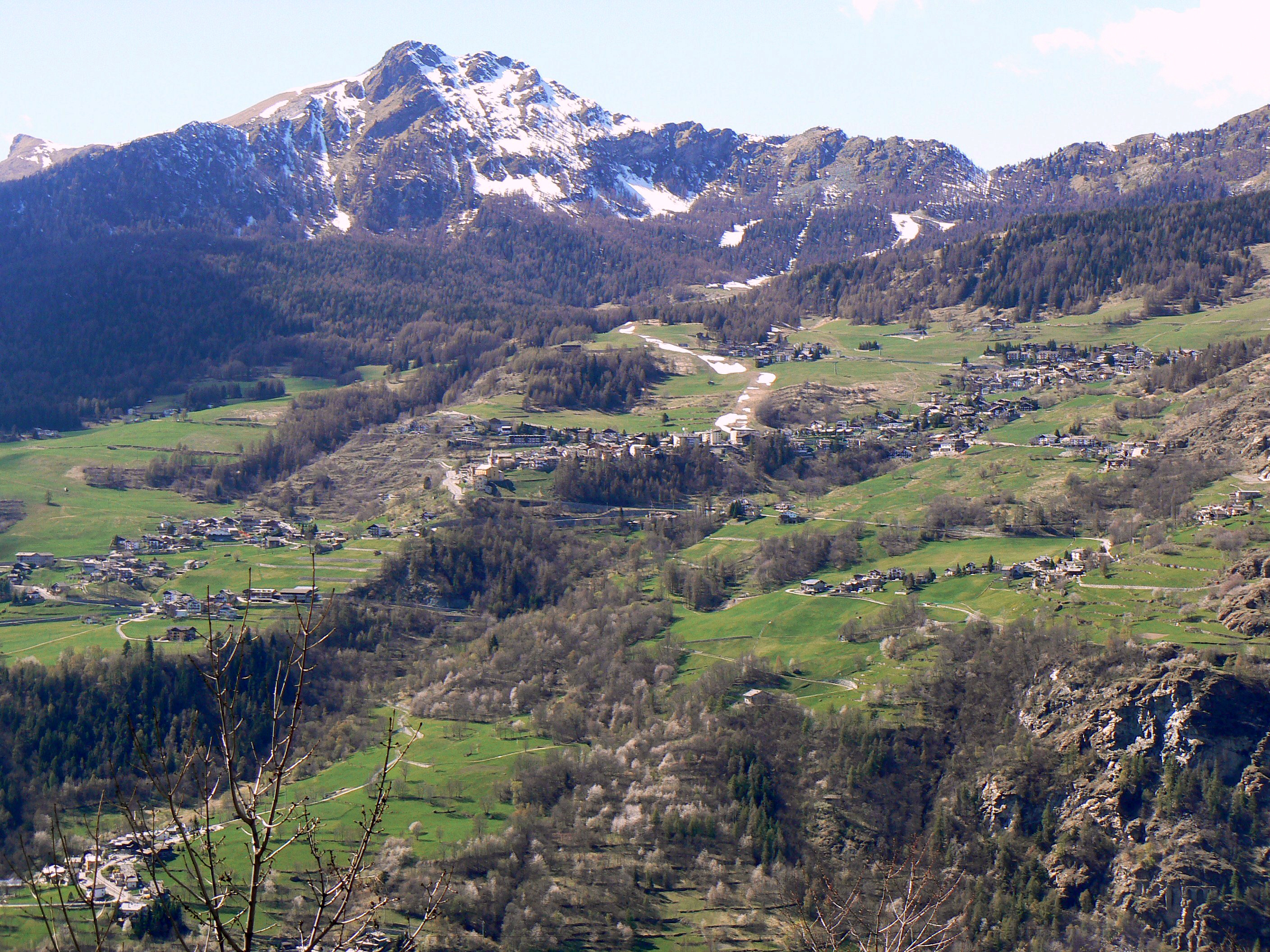
- Aerial view of Torgnon

- Coat of arms

- Location within Italy Location within Aosta Valley
- Coordinates: 45°48′N 7°34′E
- Country: Italy
- Region: Aosta Valley
- Frazioni: Berzin, Champagnod, Champeille, Chantorné, Châtel, Châtelard, Chatrian, Cheille, Chésod, Cortod, Étirol, La Gombaz, Mazod, Mongnod (chef-lieu), Nozon, Pecou, Ronc-Dessous, Ronc-Dessus, Septumian, Triatel, Tuson, Valleil, Verney, Vesan-Dessous, Vesan-Dessus

Area
  - Total: 42 km^{2} (16 sq mi)
- Elevation: 1,489 m (4,885 ft)

Population (31 December 2022)
  - Total: 557
  - Density: 13/km^{2} (34/sq mi)
- Demonym: Torgnoleins
- Time zone: UTC+1 (CET)
  - Summer (DST): UTC+2 (CEST)
- Postal code: 11020
- Dialing code: 0166
- ISTAT code: 7067
- Patron saint: Martin of Tours
- Saint day: 11 November
- Website: Official website

Torgnon (French: [tɔʁɲɔ̃]; Valdôtain: Torgnòn; Issime Walser: Tornjunh) is a town and comune in the Aosta Valley region of north-western Italy.

== The Besenval family ==
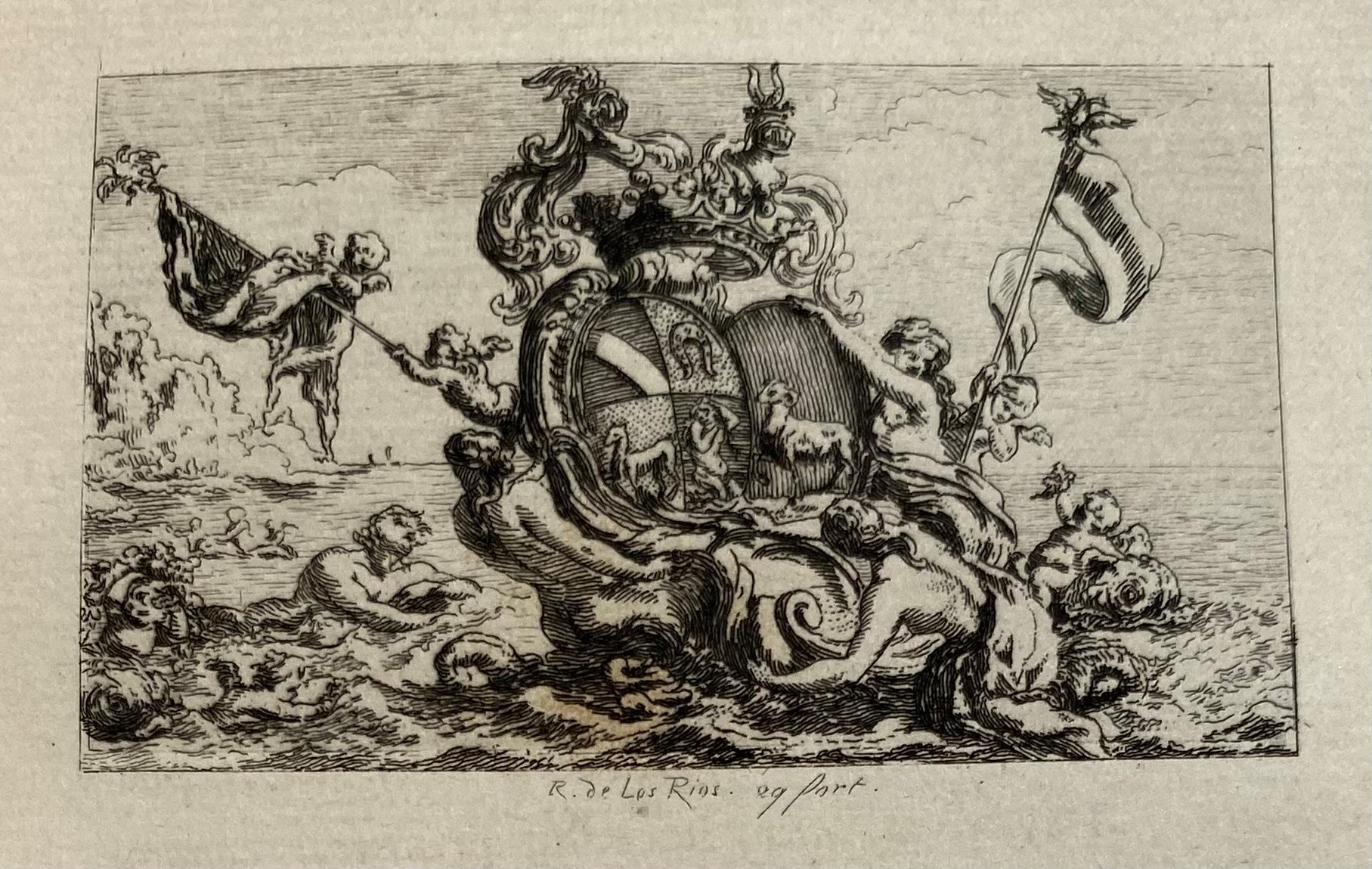
The arms of alliance of the families de Besenval (quartered shield) and Bieliński. The Barony of Brunstatt is represented by the horseshoe.

One of the most prominent families from Torgnon was the Besenval family, whose descendants later acquired citizenship in Solothurn and, as Swiss nationals, pursued careers in French service. The best-known member was Pierre Victor, Baron de Besenval de Brunstatt, an officer in French service. At his Paris residence, the Hôtel de Besenval, the baron hosted leading figures of French society, including members of the royal family. Since 1938, the Hôtel de Besenval has housed the Embassy of the Swiss Confederation and the residence of the Swiss ambassador to France.

The main line of the family died out in 1927 with Amédée Victor Louis, Comte de Besenval (1862–1927), who lived in Naples.
