= Lake Cignana =

Artificial lake of the Pennine Alps

- Lake Cignana in 2020

- Location within Aosta Valley Location within Italy Location within Alps
- Interactive map of Lake Cignana
- Location: Valtournenche, Aosta Valley, Italy
- Coordinates: 45.881333°N 7.589514°E
- Catchment area: 13.5 km^{2} (5.2 sq mi)
- Basin countries: Italy
- Surface elevation: 2,158 m (7,080 ft)

Lake Cignana or Lake Tsignanaz (Italian: Lago di Cignana, French: Lac de Tsignanaz) is an artificial mountain lake of the Pennine Alps, located in Valtournenche, Aosta Valley, Italy.

== History ==
The lake was created following the construction of the Cignana dam complex between 1925 and 1928, as part of the development of a hydroelectric power scheme in the Valtournenche Valley. The works were completed and tested in 1929.

The creation of the reservoir profoundly altered the Cignana basin. In order to allow the reservoir to be filled, the village of Cignana had to be abandoned and submerged, including the village's old chapel, while a new chapel was later built on higher ground overlooking the lake.

== Description ==
The lake has a water surface area of 0.68 km^{2} (0.26 sq mi) and is located at an altitude of 2,158 m (7,080 ft) above sea level. Its waters feed the Maën Hydroelectric Power Station, and in turn the Marmore river.
