= Covalou Hydroelectric Power Station =

Power station in Antey-Saint-André, Italy

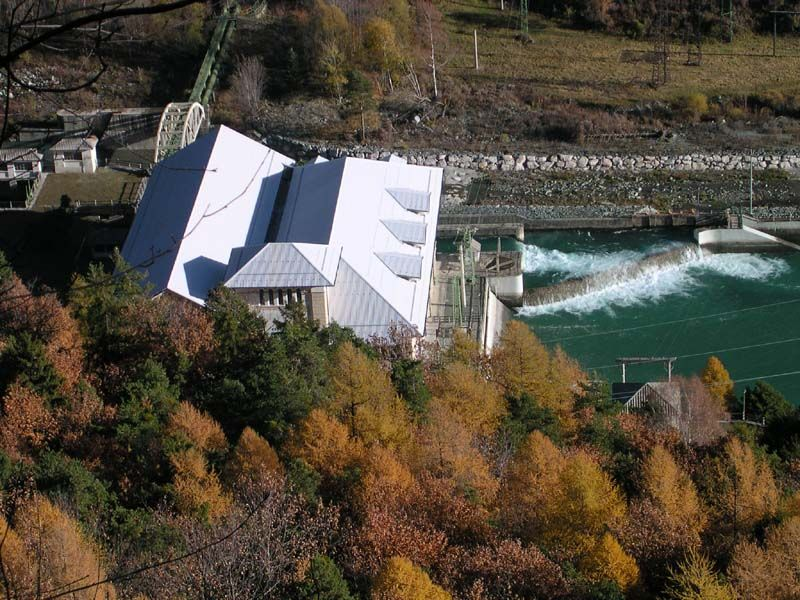
- Covalou Hydroelectric Power Station in 2003

- Location within Italy
- Country: Italy
- Location: Antey-Saint-André, Aosta Valley
- Coordinates: 45.774361°N 7.595111°E
- Purpose: Power
- Status: Operational
- Opening date: 1926

Covalou Hydroelectric Power Station (Italian: Centrale idroelettrica di Covalou, French: Centrale hydroélectrique de Covalou) is a hydroelectric power plant located in Antey-Saint-André, in the Aosta Valley region of northern Italy.

The plant is owned and operated by Compagnia Valdostana delle Acque (CVA), the regional hydroelectric utility of the Aosta Valley.

== History ==
The power station was built and brought into service in 1926 as part of a broader hydroelectric development of the Valtournenche valley undertaken by the Società Idroelettrica Piemonte (SIP). The plant's building was designed by the Italian architect Giovanni Muzio.

The plant was automated in 1955.

== Description ==
The machine hall of the plant houses three generating units connected to Pelton-type turbines, supplied by two penstocks with a flow rate of 10.5 m³/s and generating a power output of 41 MW.

== Gallery ==
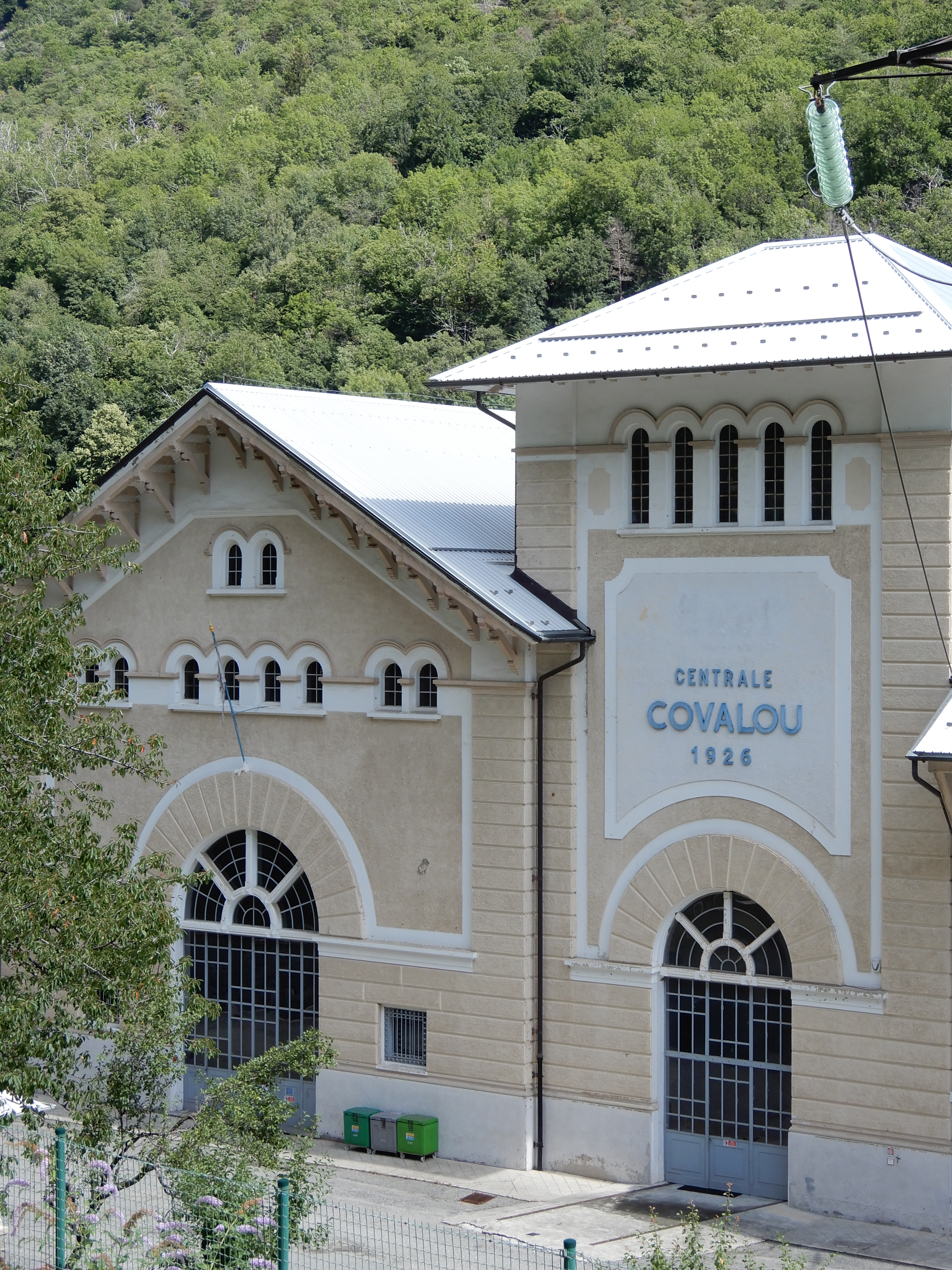

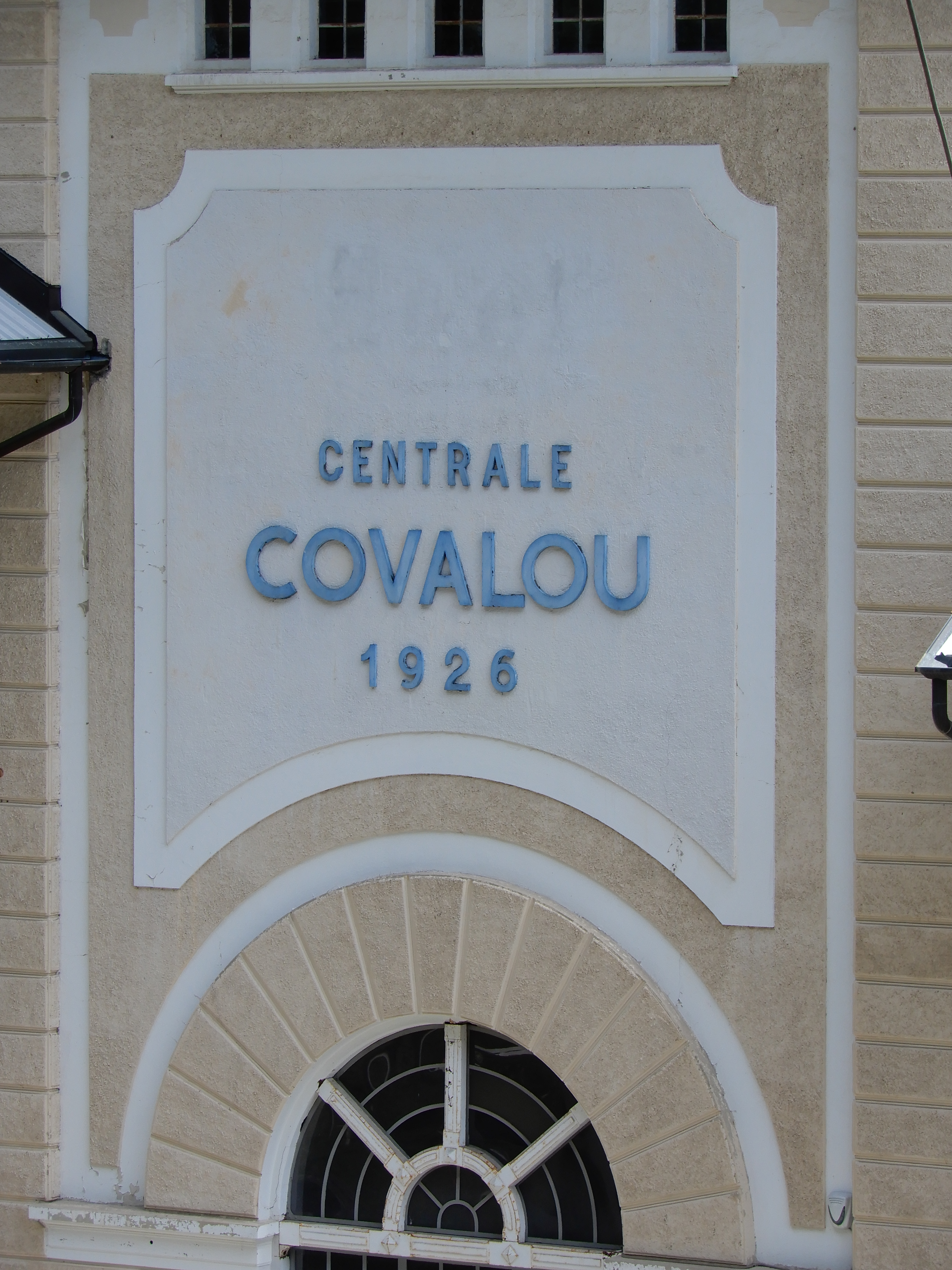

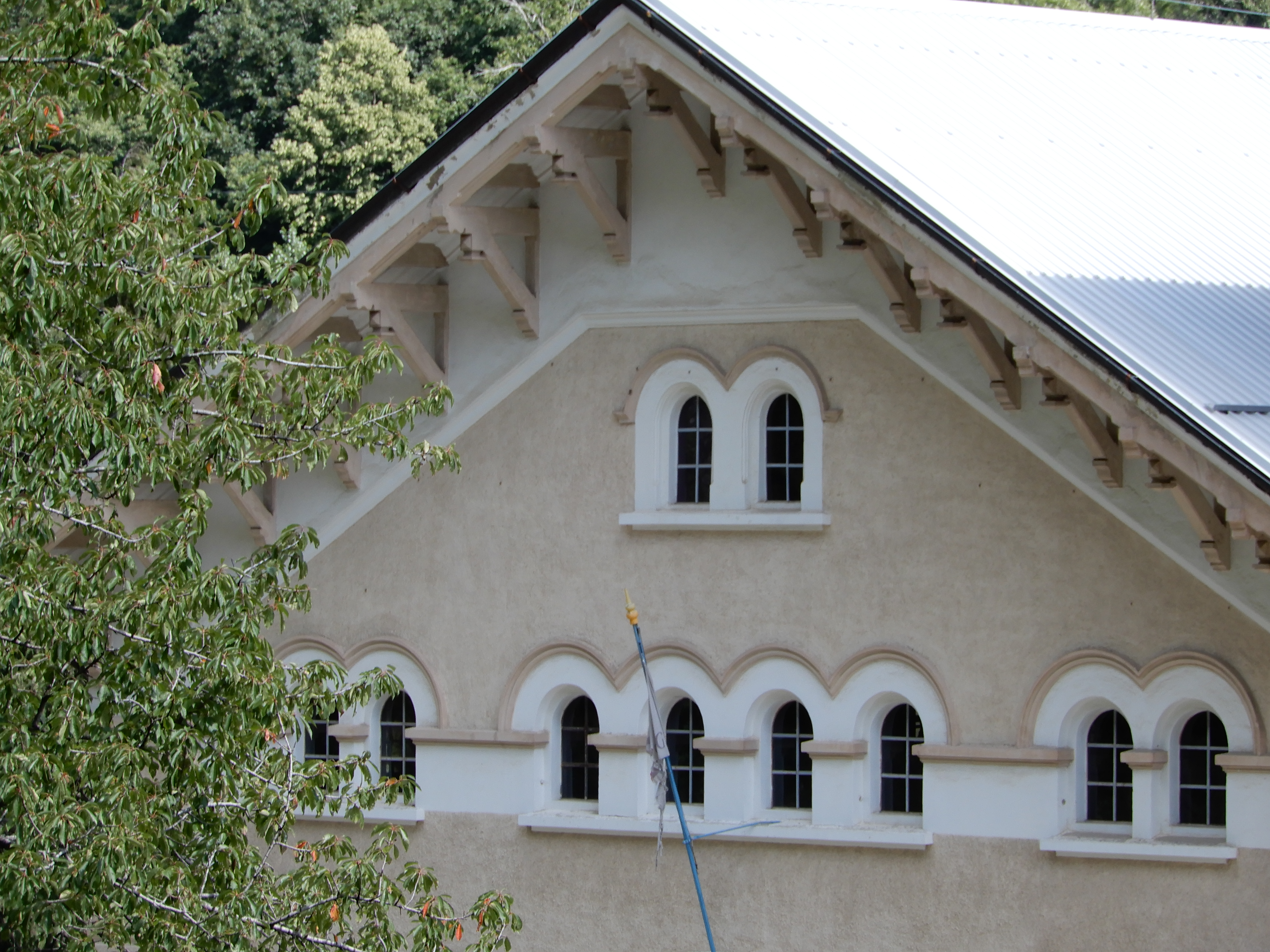

== See also ==
- Maën Hydroelectric Power Station
