= Maën Hydroelectric Power Station =

Power station in Valtournenche, Italy

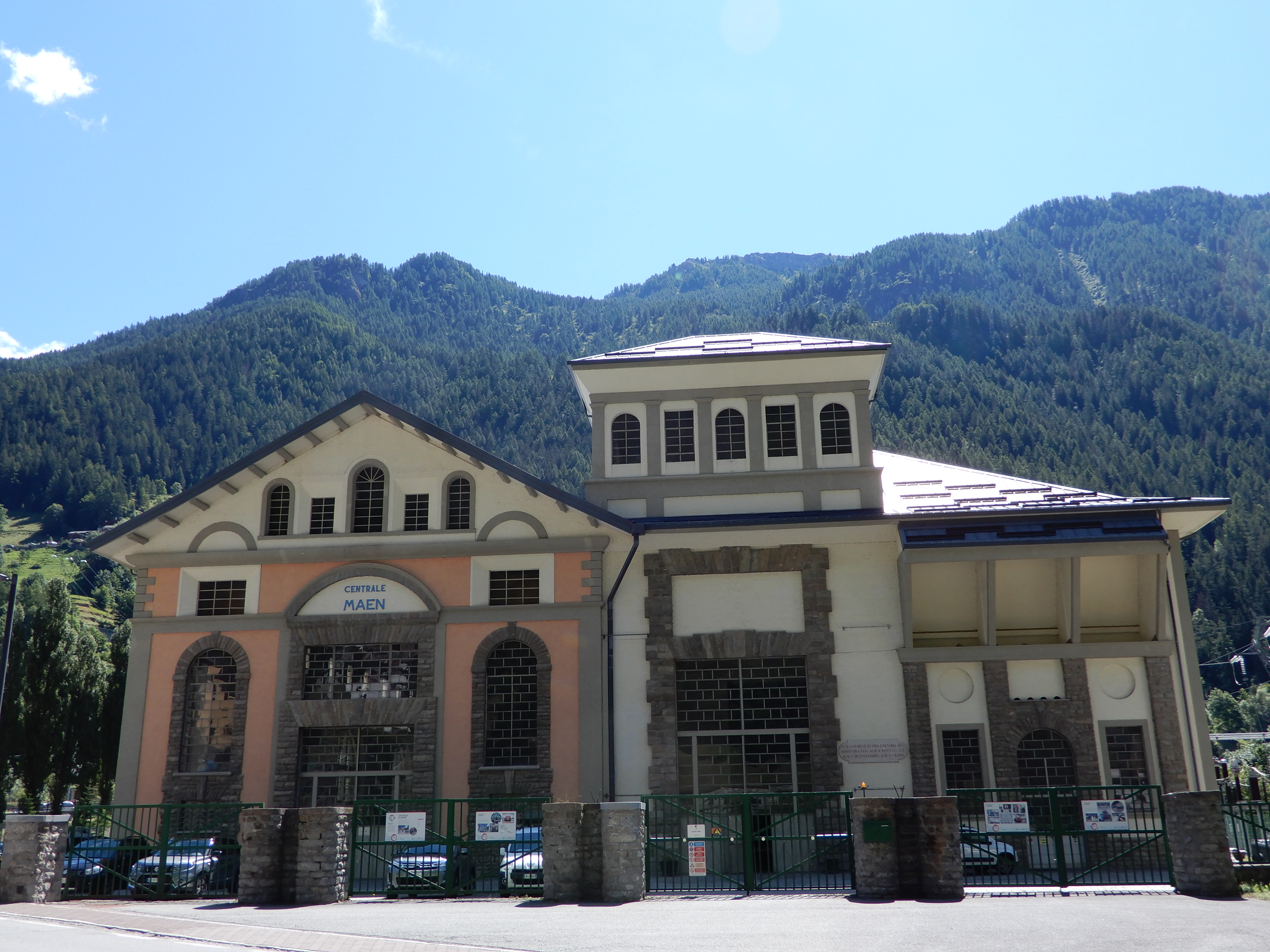
- Maën Hydroelectric Power Station in 2021

- Location within Italy
- Country: Italy
- Location: Valtournenche, Aosta Valley
- Coordinates: 45.868167°N 7.614667°E
- Purpose: Power
- Status: Operational
- Opening date: 1928

Maën Hydroelectric Power Station (Italian: Centrale idroelettrica di Maën, French: Centrale hydroélectrique de Maën) is a hydroelectric power plant located in Valtournenche, in the Aosta Valley region of northern Italy.

The plant is owned and operated by Compagnia Valdostana delle Acque (CVA), the regional hydroelectric utility of the Aosta Valley.

== History ==
The power station was built and brought into service in 1928, as part of a broader hydroelectric development of the Valtournenche valley undertaken by the Società Idroelettrica Piemonte (SIP). The plant's building was designed by the Italian architect Giovanni Muzio.

== Description ==
Located at an elevation of 1,342 m, the power station comprises two generating units supplied by separate water intakes. The first is fed by Lake Cignana, while the second receives water from the Marmore stream via the upstream Les Perrères Hydroelectric Power Station. The Lake Cignana scheme has an installed capacity of 22 MW and is equipped with a single generating unit operating at a design discharge of 3 m³/s under a hydraulic head of 828 m. The Marmore scheme, by contrast, consists of two generating units with a combined installed capacity of 25.2 MW. It operates at a design discharge of 4.5 m³/s under a hydraulic head of 447 m.

The building of the power station has two large halls, one of which now serves as a cultural venue for exhibitions.

== Gallery ==
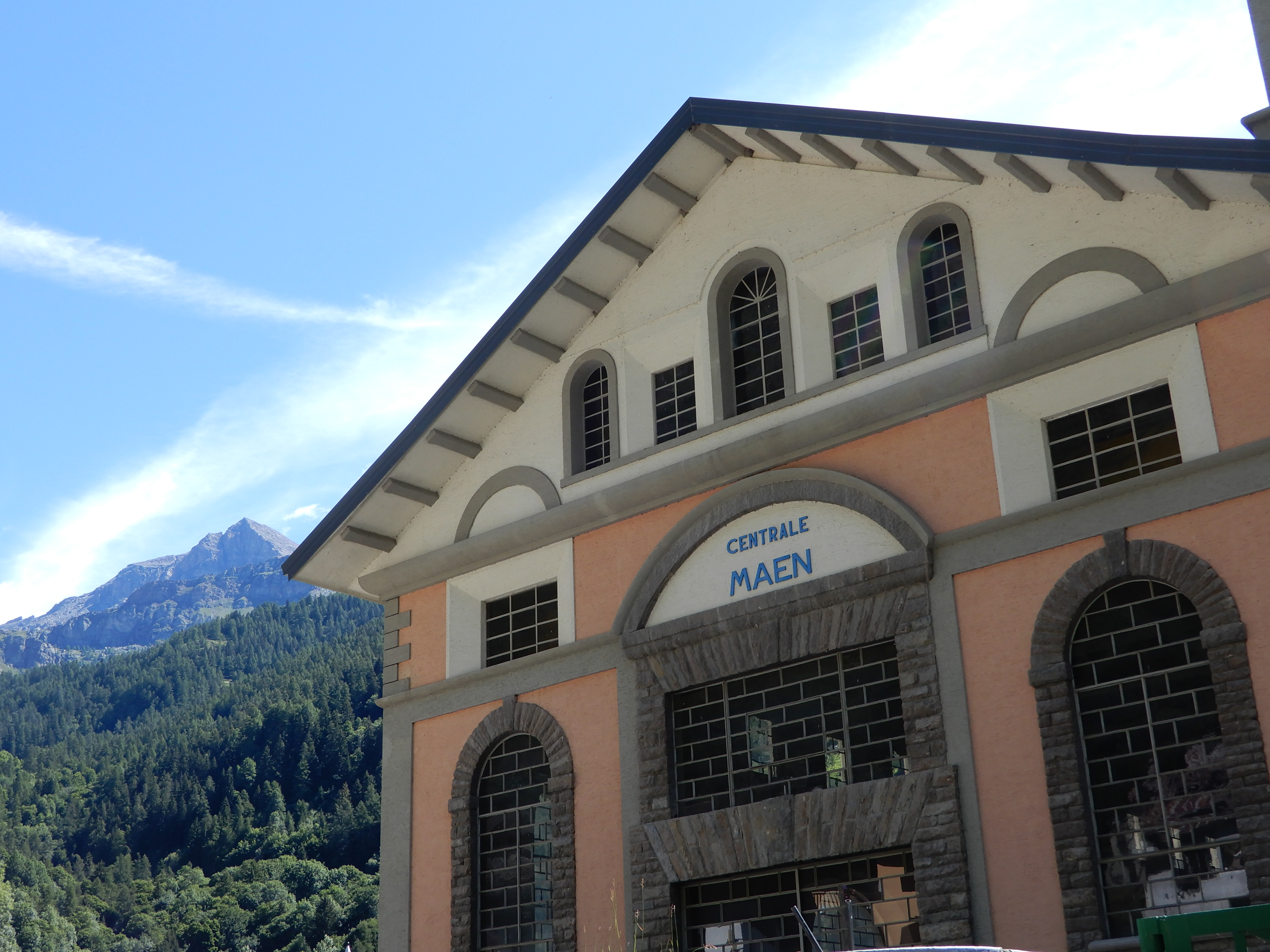

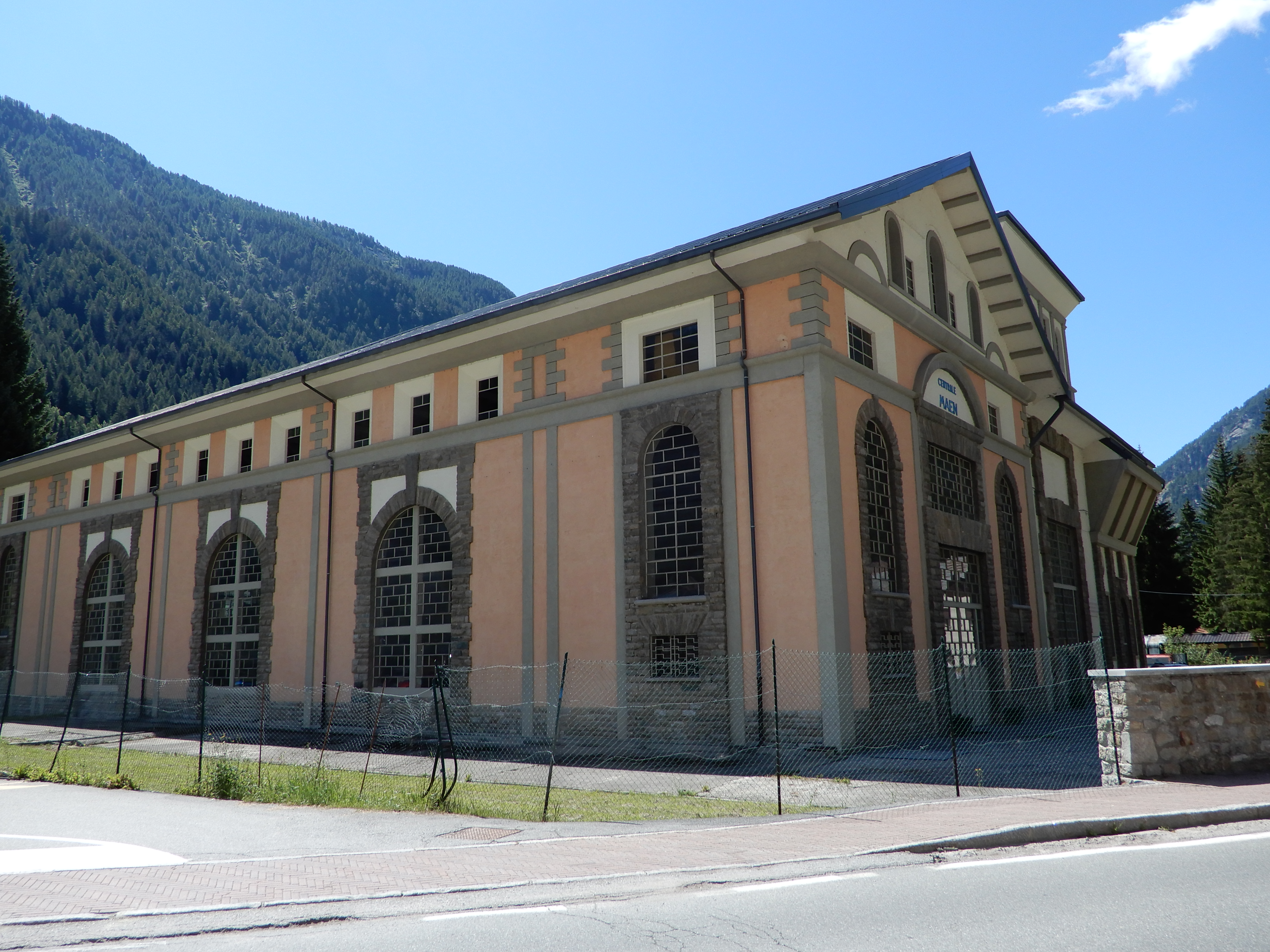

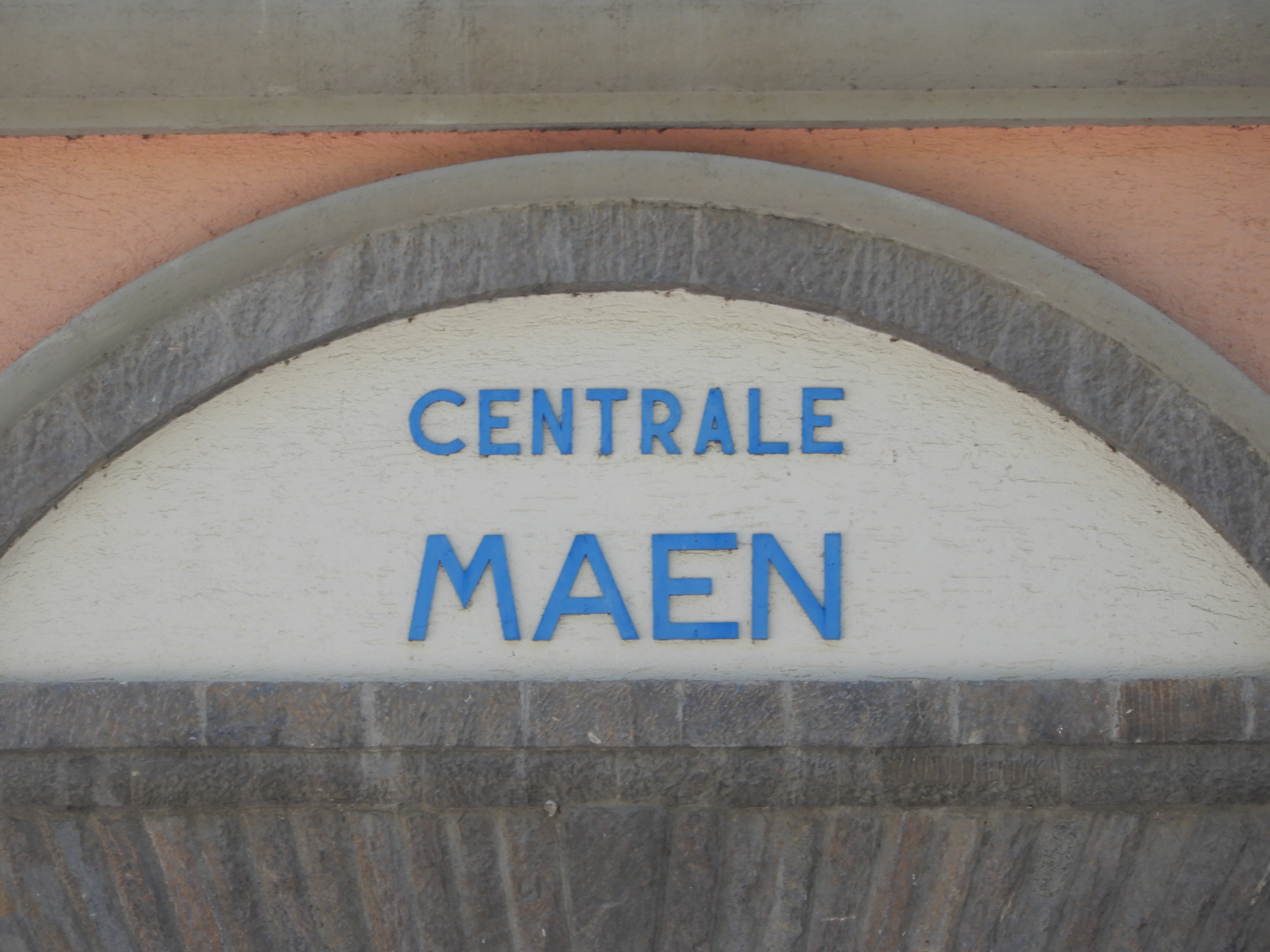

== See also ==
- Les Perrères Hydroelectric Power Station
- Covalou Hydroelectric Power Station
