= Les Perrères Hydroelectric Power Station =

Power station in Valtournenche, Italy

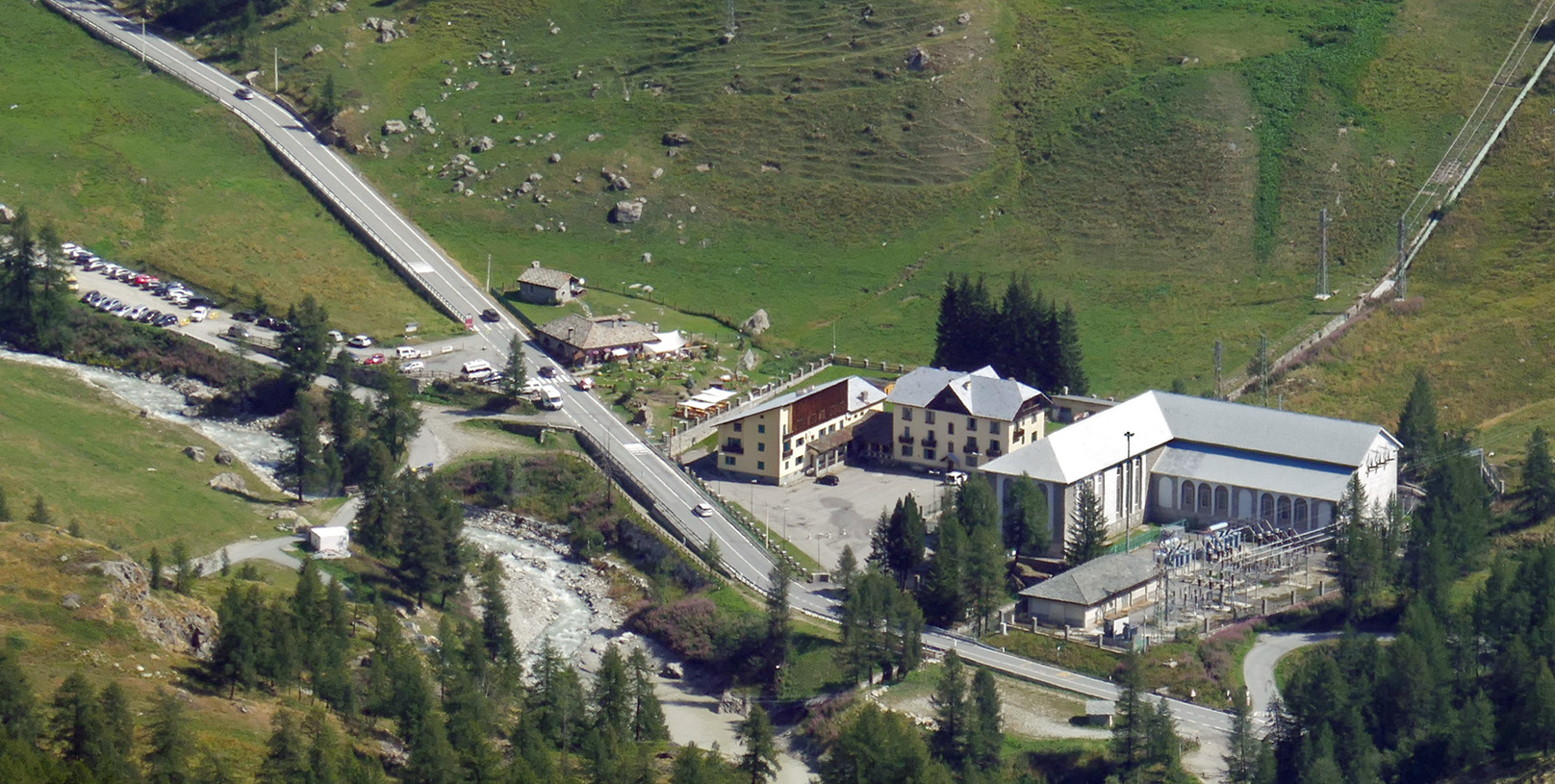
- Les Perrères Hydroelectric Power Station in 2022

- Location within Italy
- Country: Italy
- Location: Valtournenche, Aosta Valley
- Coordinates: 45.907619°N 7.616752°E
- Purpose: Power
- Status: Operational
- Opening date: 1943

Les Perrères Hydroelectric Power Station (Italian: Centrale idroelettrica di Les Perrères, French: Centrale hydroélectrique de Les Perrères) is a hydroelectric power plant located in Valtournenche, in the Aosta Valley region of northern Italy.

The plant is owned and operated by Compagnia Valdostana delle Acque (CVA), the regional hydroelectric utility of the Aosta Valley.

== History ==
The power plant was brought into service in 1943, during the same period in which the Lake Goillet dam was being completed. Construction of the dam took place between 1939 and 1947.

== Description ==
Located at an elevation of 1,844 metres above sea level in the upper Valtournenche Valley, Les Perrères is a reservoir-type hydroelectric power plant supplied by water from Lake Goillet. Water is conveyed to the powerhouse through a 3-kilometre-long penstock, exploiting a hydraulic head of approximately 666 metres and a flow rate of about 2 m³/s.

The plant is equipped with two generating units fitted with Pelton turbines, providing a total installed capacity of approximately 18 MW.

The main building is distinguished by its austere and functional architecture, typical of mid-20th-century industrial design.

== See also ==
- Maën Hydroelectric Power Station
